= List of chairs =

The following is a partial list of chairs with descriptions, with internal or external cross-references about most of the chairs. For other chair-like types (like bench, stool), see Seats.

== 0–9 ==
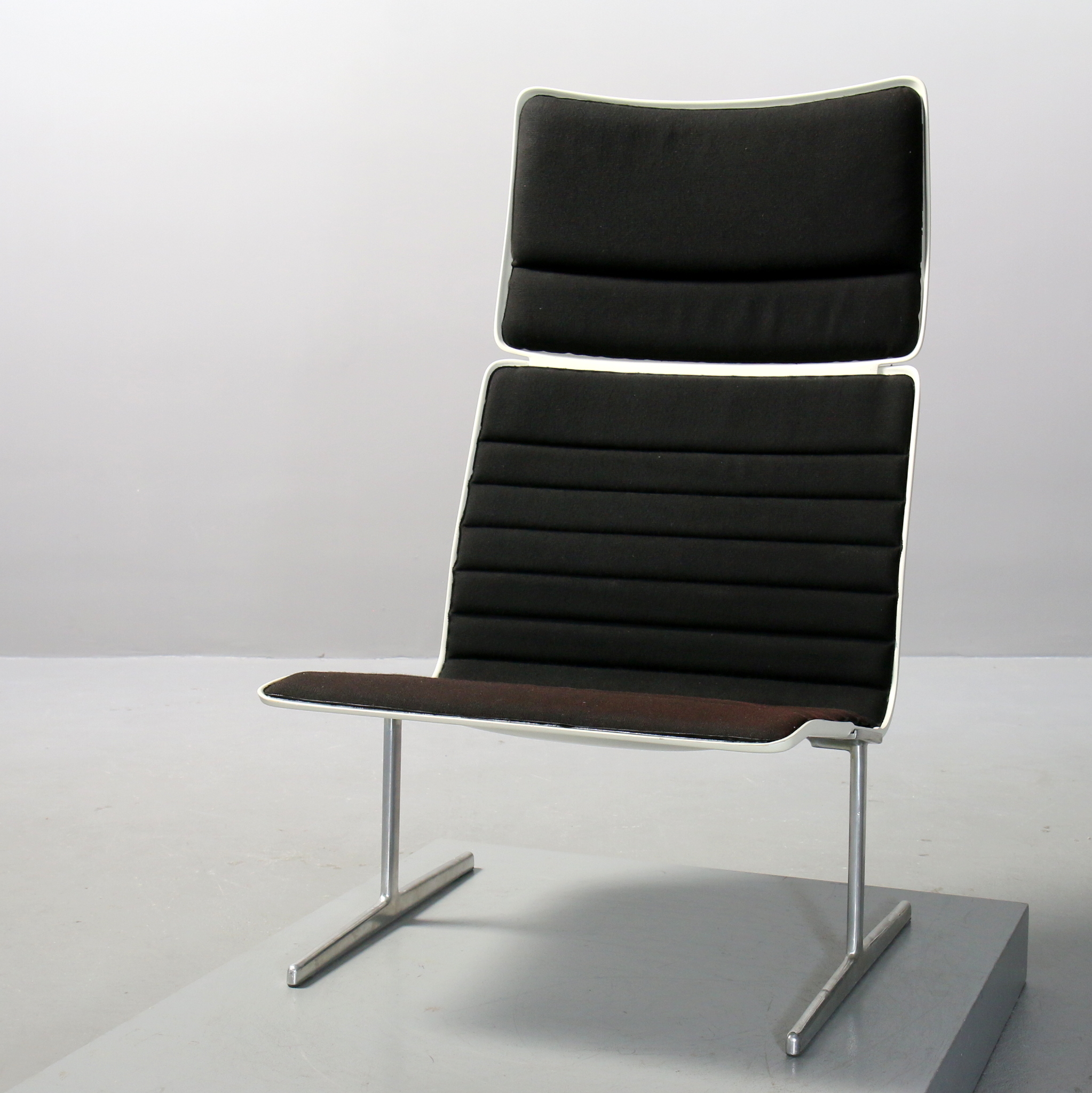
601 Chair by Dieter Rams

- 10 Downing Street Guard Chairs, two antique chairs used by guards in the early 19th century
- 14 chair (No. 14 chair) is the archetypal bentwood side chair originally made by the Gebrüder Thonet chair company of Germany in the 19th century, and widely copied and popular today
- 3107 chair (Model 3107 chair) is a variant of the Ant chair, both designed by Arne Jacobsen (see below)
- 40/4 (forty-in-four) stacking chair designed by David Rowland, 1964
- 406 Aalto armchair designed by Alvar Aalto in 1938 (IKEA sells a similar design called the Poäng lounge chair)
- 4801 armchair designed by Joe Colombo for Kartell, 1964
- 601 Chair designed by Dieter Rams
- 620 Chair designed by Dieter Rams for Vitsœ
- 654W Lounge Chair (Model 654W), designed by Jens Risom for Knoll
- 683 chair by Carlo De Carli for Cassina (inaugural 1954 Compasso d'Oro award)

== A ==
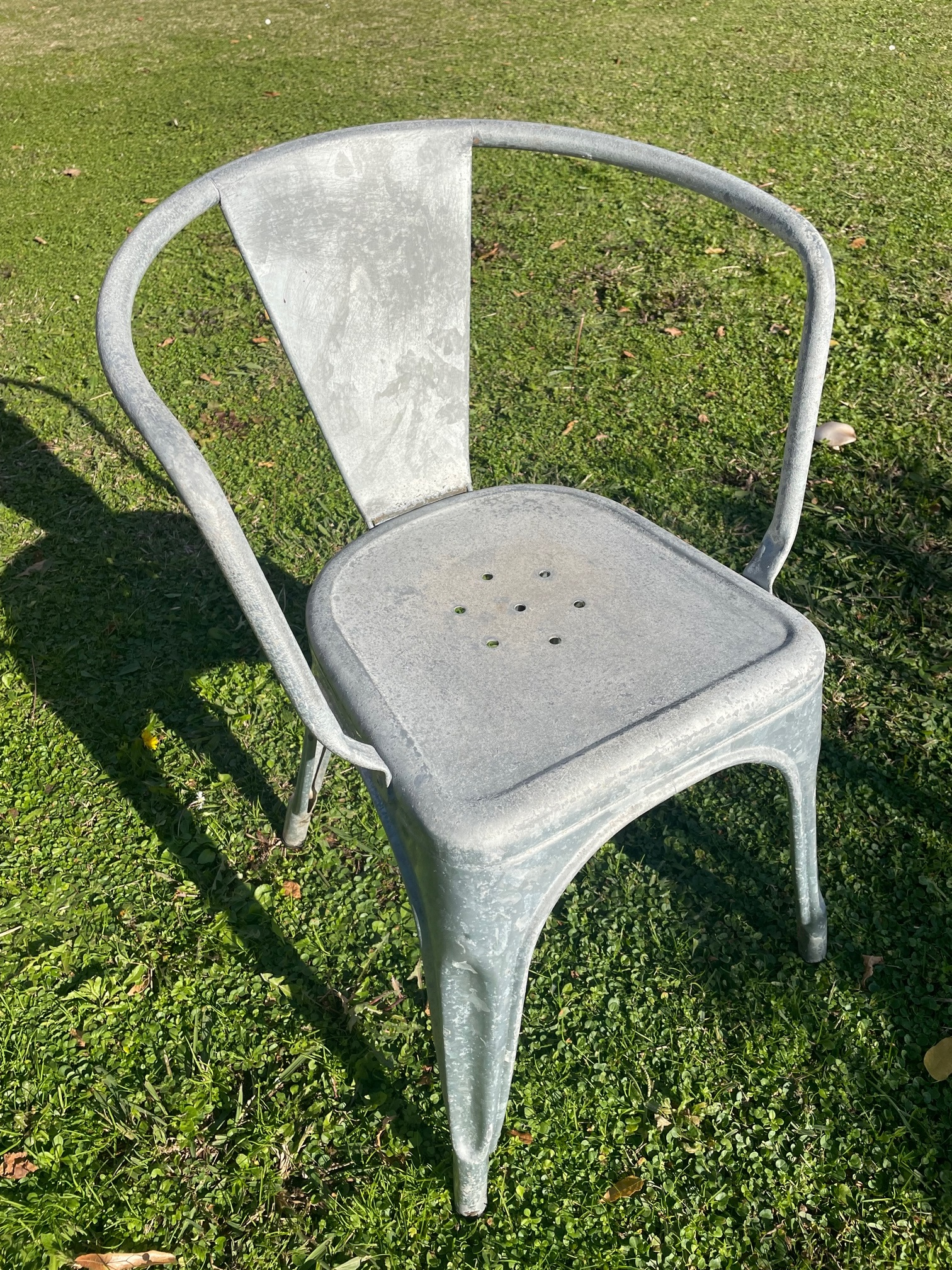
A56 Chair by Jean Pauchard for Tolix (1956)

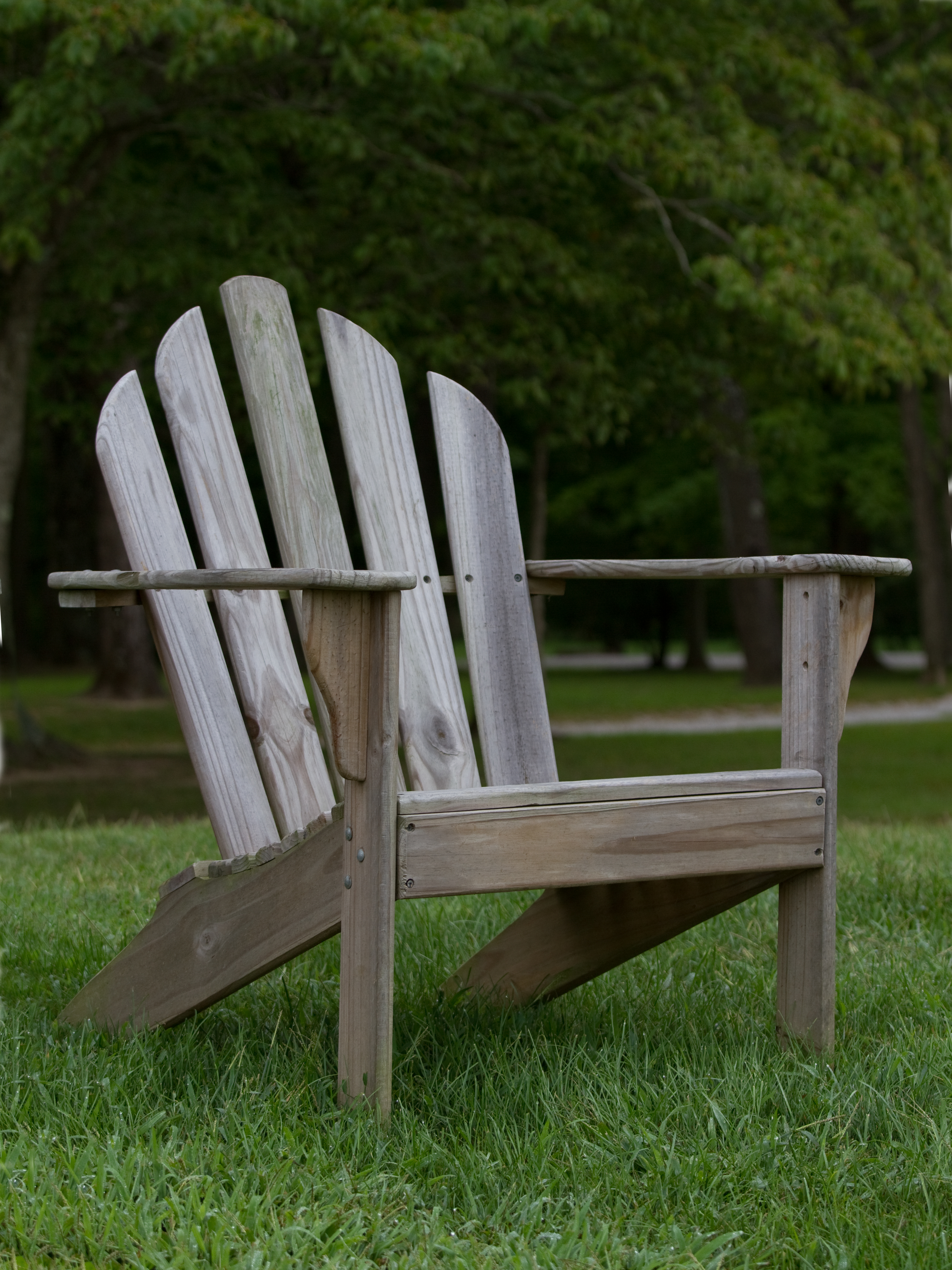
Adirondack chair

- arm chair
- "A" Chair (Chaise A), designed by Xavier Pauchard for Tolix in 1927. (Later variants including the "A56" were designed by Pauchard's sons.)
- Adirondack chair, a non-adjustable wooden outdoor lounge chair
- Aeron chair, an ergonomic office chair designed by Don Chadwick and Bill Stumpf for Herman Miller
- Air-Chair, a lightweight moulded chair design by Jasper Morrison for Magis
- Alta chair and ottoman designed by Oscar Niemeyer
- Ant chair, designed in 1952 by Arne Jacobsen for use in the canteen of the Danish pharmaceutical firm Novo Industries.

== B ==
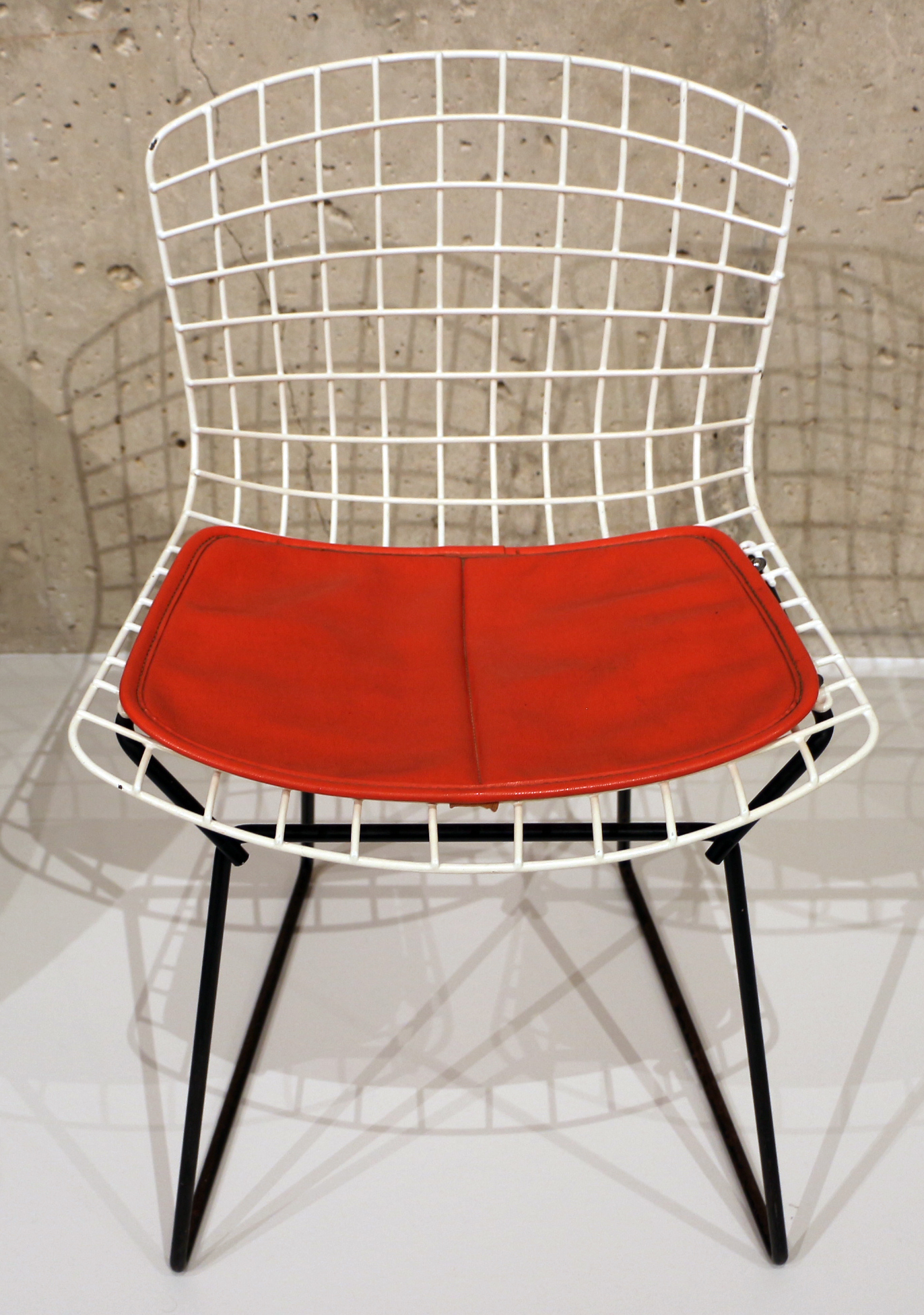
Bertoia chair (child sized model)

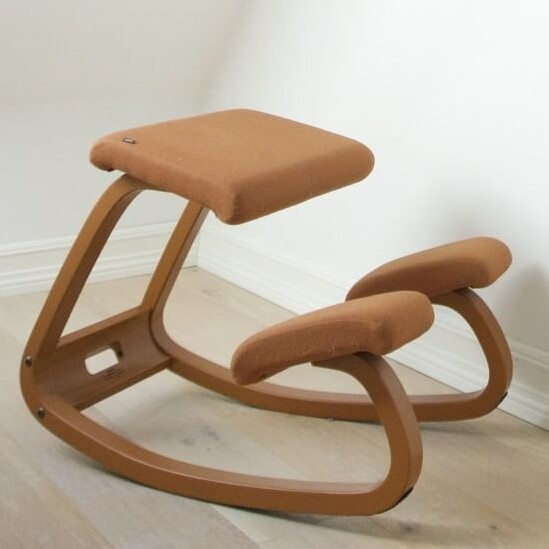
Balans Chair designed by Peter Opsvik (1979)

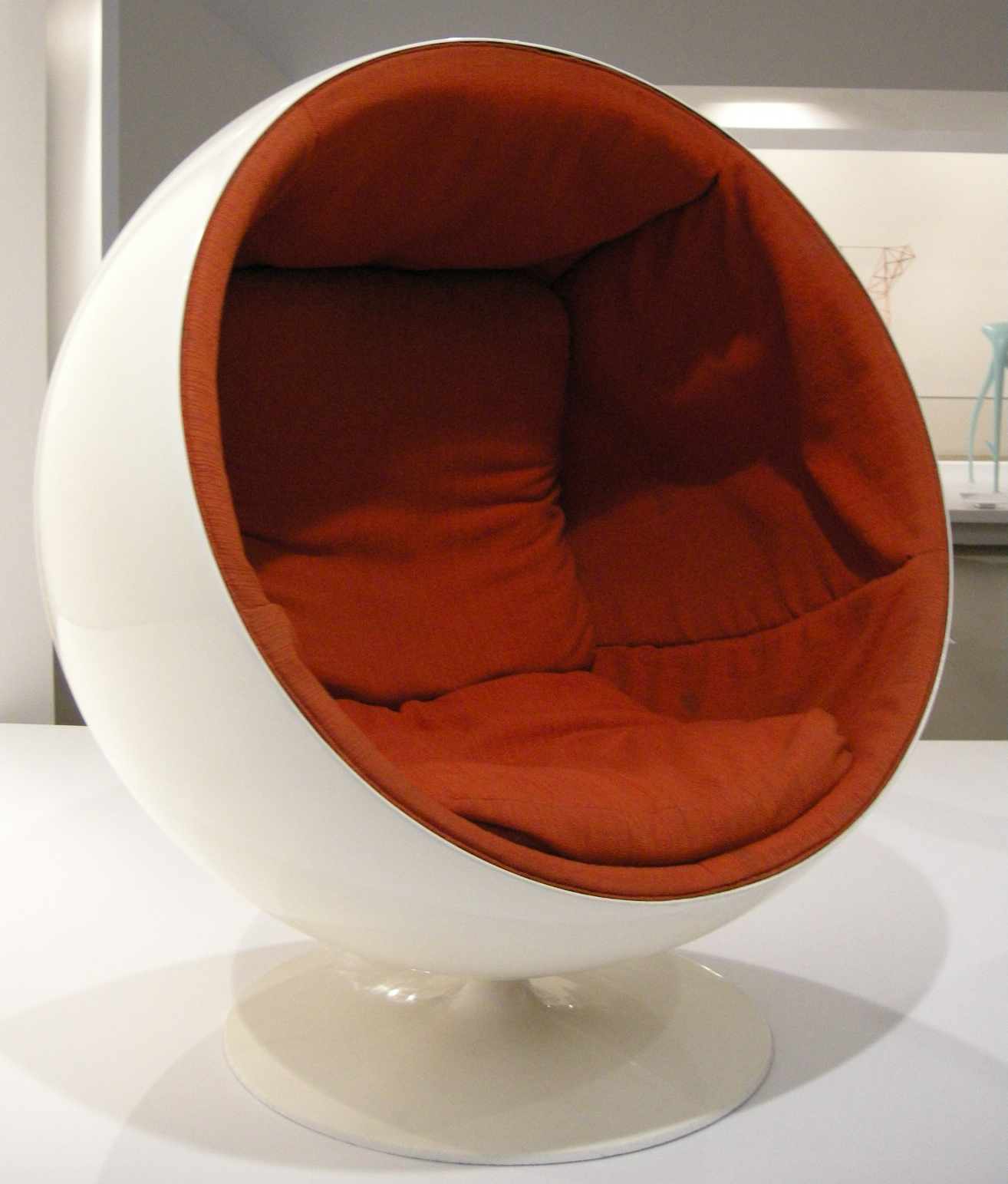
Ball Chair by Eero Aarnio (1963)

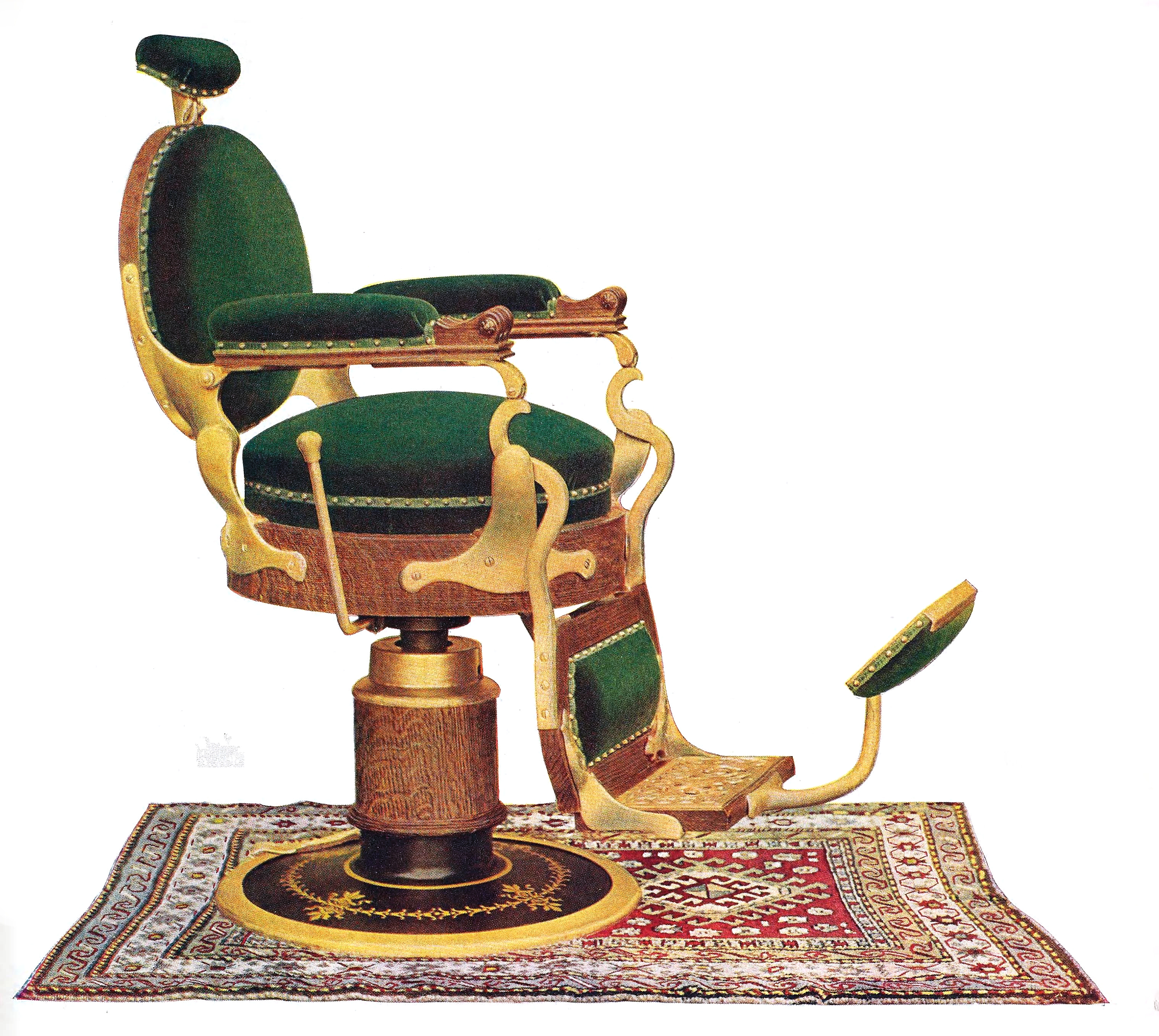
Barber's chair

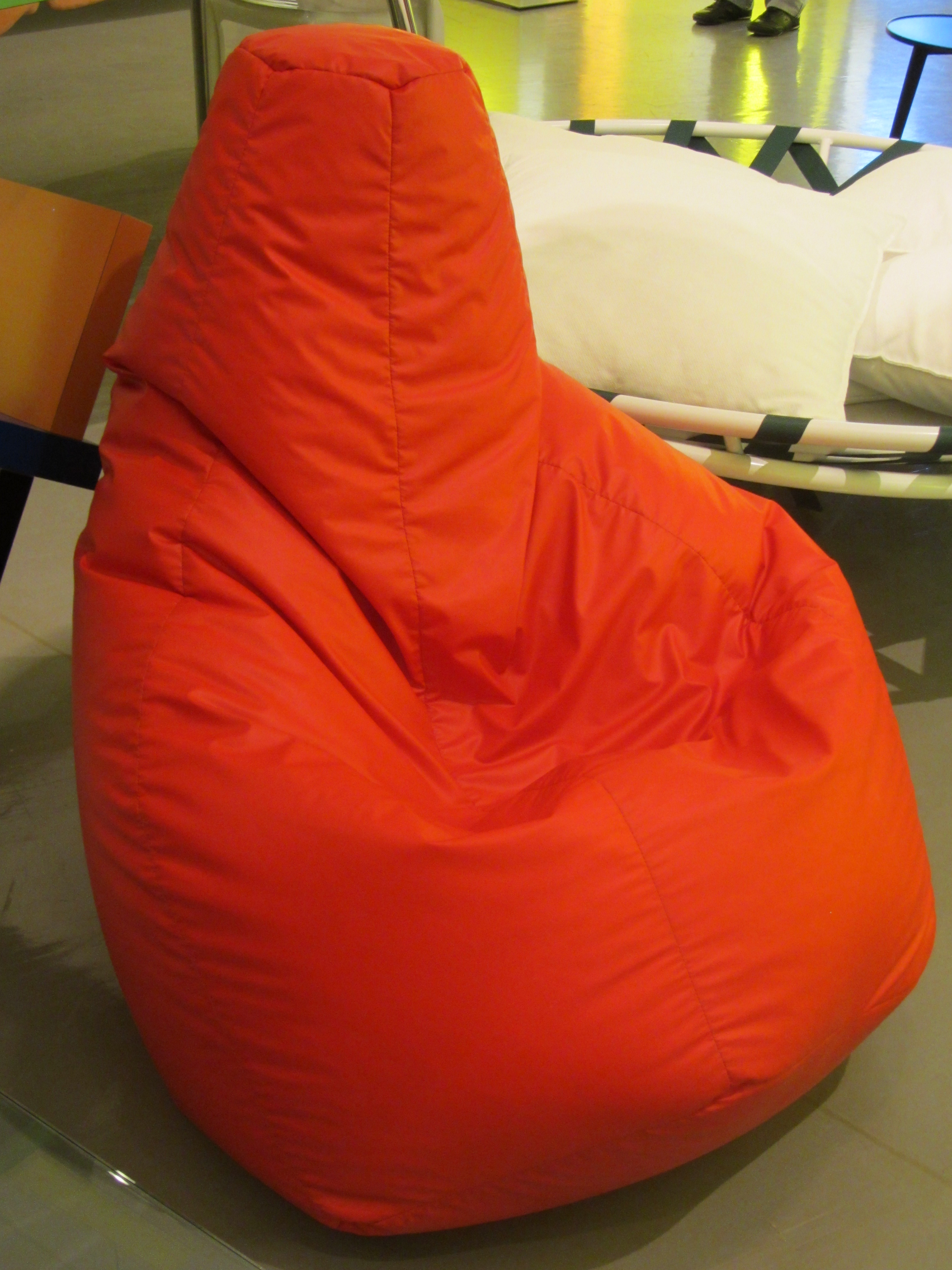
Bean bag chair (Sacco) by Piero Gatti, Cesare Paolini, Franco Teodoro for Zanotta (1968)

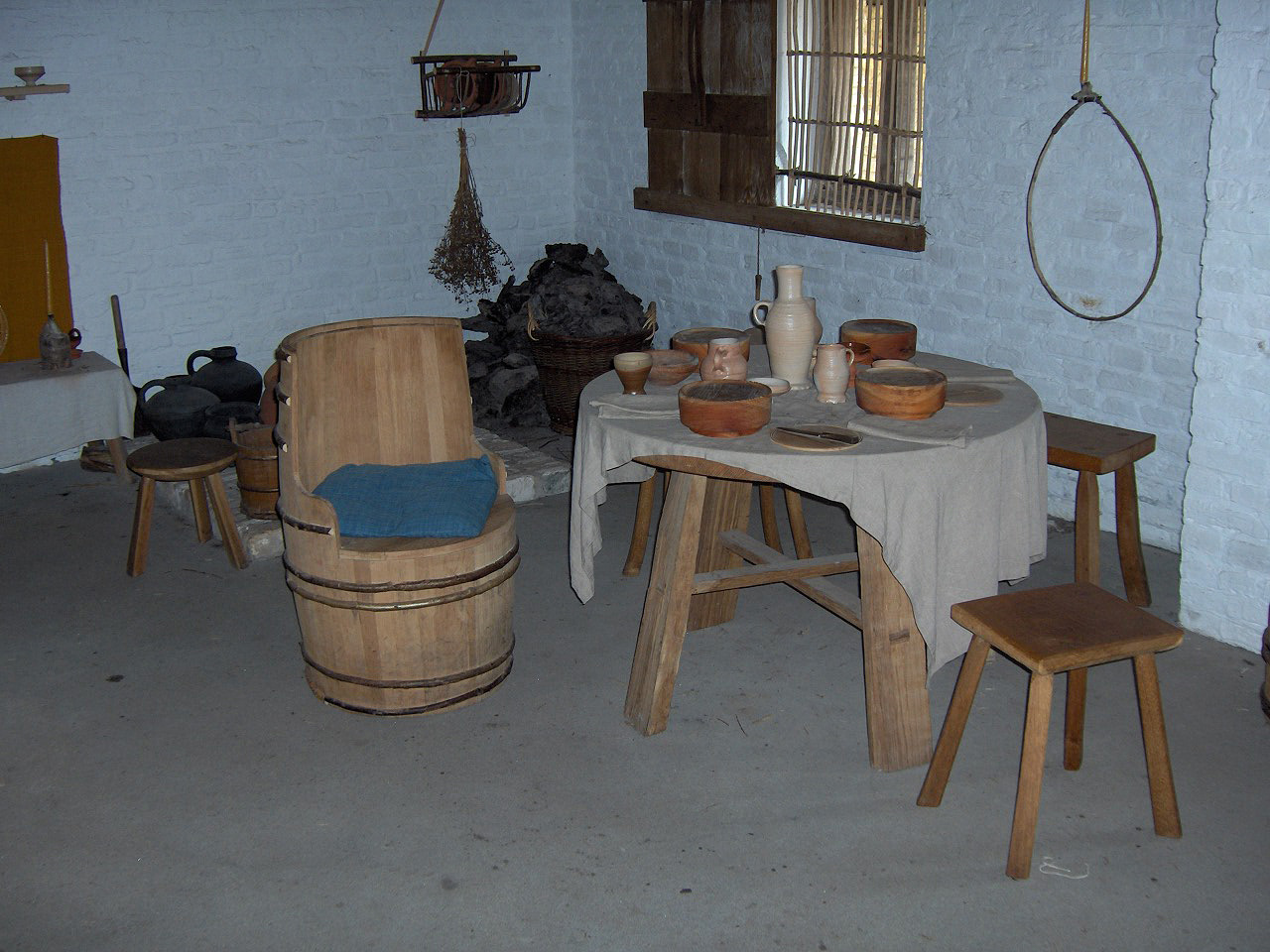
Barrel chair (c. 1465)

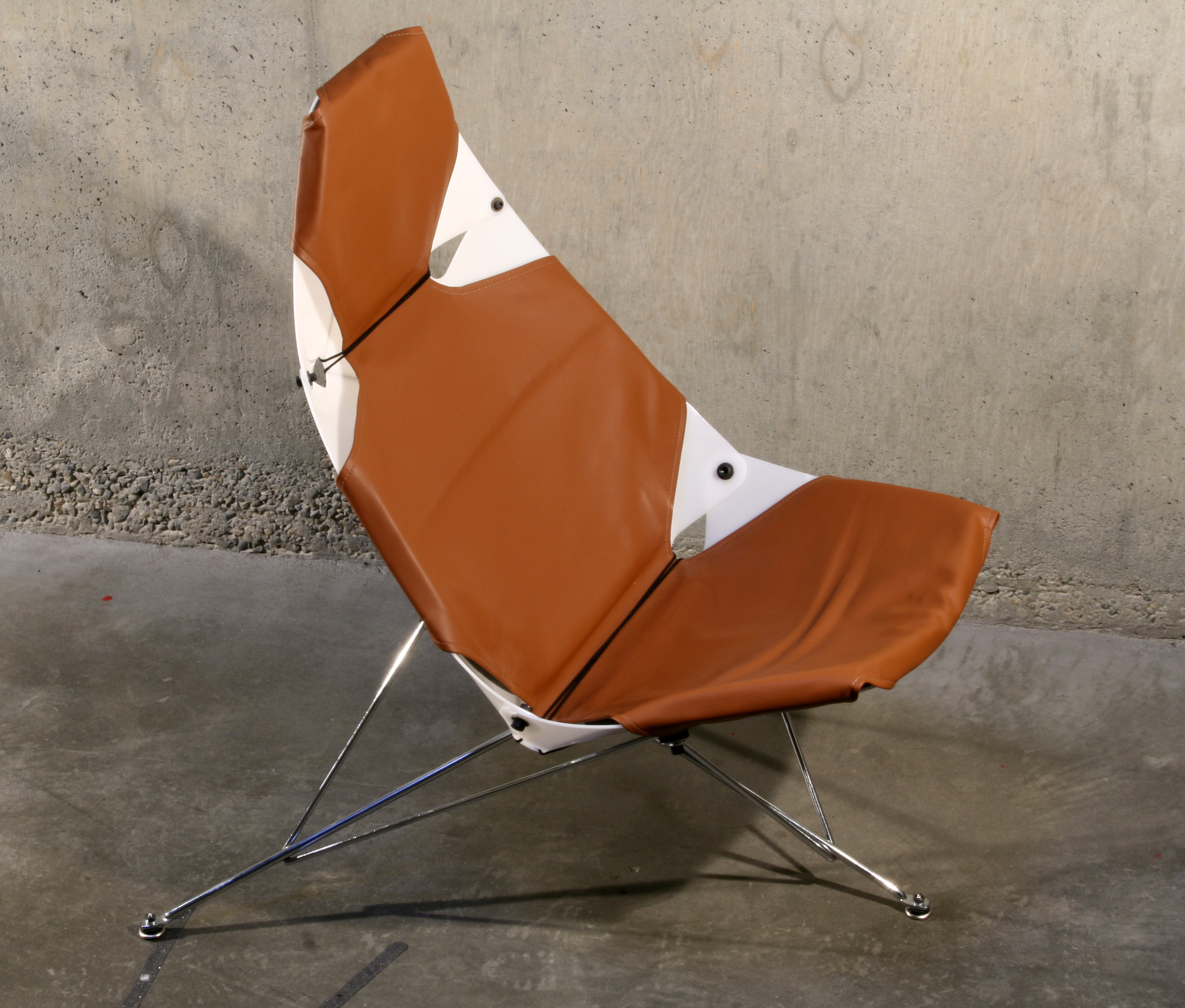
Bikini chair by Wendell Lovett (1949)

- Bachelor's chair, dates from the 18th century and converts into a stepstool, ladder or ironing board
- Backpack chair, a combination of a backpack and a chair, sometimes used for camping, hiking or short hunting trips
- Balans chair, designed by Norwegian furniture designer Peter Opsvik in 1979, is the original kneeling chair design
- Ball Chair, designed by Finnish furniture designer Eero Aarnio in 1963 (also see: Bubble chair)
- Bar stool, tall narrow stool designed for seating at a bar or counter
- Bárány chair, a swivel chair used in pilot training to teach reliance on aerospace instruments
- Barber's Chair
- Barcelona chair, designed in 1929 by Mies van der Rohe and Lilly Reich; characterized by leather upholstery, an angled seat and back without armrests, and X-shaped stainless steel legs; made by Knoll (and widely copied)
- Bardic chair, custom chair built every year for the winner of an Awdl poetry contest in Wales
- Barrel chair, has a high round back like half a barrel; large and upholstered
- Basket chair, mid-century design by Gian Franco Legler
- Bath chair, light carriage on wheels with a folding hood, for outdoor transport, often used by the physically disabled
- Beach chair (Strandkorb), designed to provide comfort and protection from sun, wind, rain, and sand on beaches frequented by tourists
- Bean bag chair (Sacco), designed in 1968 designed by Piero Gatti, Cesare Paolini, and Franco Teodoro for Zanotta
- Bergère, upholstered chair introduced in the Régence/Rococo period in France in the 17th century
- Bertoia side chair, steel grid wire chairs designed for Knoll by sculptor Harry Bertoia
- Bikini chair, designed by architect Wendell Lovett in 1949 and first exhibited in 10th Triennale di Milano 1954; made of metal, molded plastic, and leather; featured in the magazine Domus February 1954 (#291)
- Bofinger chair, first chair worldwide in fiberglass-reinforced polyester to be produced in one single process over a steel mould; considered a classic of modern furniture design history
- Bosun's chair, a device used to suspend a person from a rope to perform work aloft
- Brewster Chair, a style of upright, turned, wooden armchair made in the mid-17th century in New England named after Pilgrim and colonial leader William Brewster of Plymouth, Massachusetts
- Brno chair, designed by Ludwig Mies van der Rohe and Lilly Reich in 1929–1930
- Bubble Chair, designed by Eero Aarnio in 1968 in Finland; a modernist classic
- Buddy bench, a special place in a school playground where a child can go when he or she wants someone to talk to
- Bungee chair, any chair which incorporates bungee cords as a primary material
- Butterfly chair (BKF chair) designed in 1938 by Bonet, Kurchan and Ferrari-Hardoy (Argentina); a light folding metal frame with a large cloth or leather sling hung from the frame's four high points.
- ButtOn Chair, designed for "fidgety children" in classrooms. Like a stool with a seat that tilts and requires active balance.

== C ==
- Cabriolet or Louis XV style armchair
- Campaign chair, designs made to facilitate travel, historically for military campaigns
- Campeche chair, a 19th-century Mexican lounge chair, popular in Latin America, the Caribbean, and the American South. It has X-shaped sides and a sling seat and back made of leather, cane or wood slats. Similar to a planter's chair, but without the extended arms.
- Camping chair, lightweight folding design typically with a fabric seat and backrest
- Cantilever chair, has no back legs; for support its seat and back cantilever off the top of the front legs (see: Cesca chair)
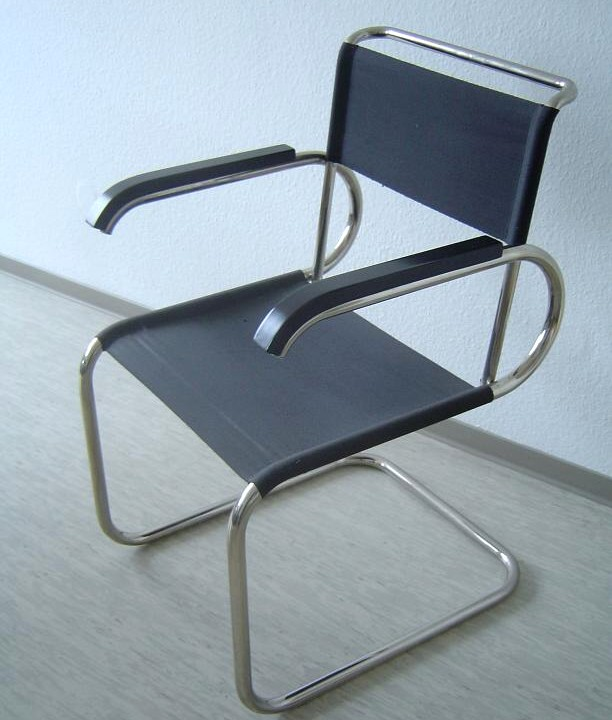
  B55 Cantilever chair by Marcel Breuer
- Captain's chair, was originally a low-backed wooden armchair; today the term is often applied to adjustable individual seats in a car with arm rests
- Caquetoire, also known as a conversation chair, used in the European Renaissance, was developed for women because it was wider so women's fashions at the time could fit into it; this is demonstrated by the U-shaped arms
- Car chair, a car seat in an automobile in which either the pilot or passenger sits, customarily in the forward direction. Many car chairs are adorned in leather or synthetic material designed for comfort or relief from the noted stress of being seated. Variants include a toddler's or infant's carseat, which are often placed atop an existing chair and secured by way of extant seat belts or other such articles.
- Carver chair, similar to a Brewster chair and from the same region and period
- Cathedra, a bishop's ceremonial chair
- Centripetal Spring Armchair, 19th-century office chair
- Cesca chair ("Breuer chair"), designed by Marcel Breuer for Knoll
- Chaise a bureau, a Rococo style of chair, created during the first half of the 18th century, constructed so it could sit in a corner of a room (there is one leg directly in the back and one directly in the front, and then one leg on each side)
- Chandigarh chair, designed by Eulie Chowdhury, Pierre Jeanneret, et al. in the 1950s for use in the public buildings of the new city of Chandigarh.
- Chaperone chair, a three-seat chair from the 1800s that allowed a chaperone to observe a courting couple (see: Courting chair)
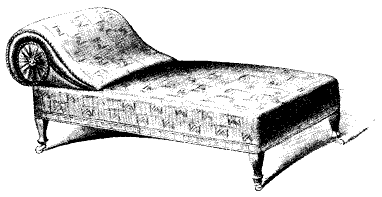
- Chaise longue
  Chaise longue (French for "long chair"), a chair with a seat long enough to completely support its user's legs. In the U.S., it is often mistakenly referred to as a 'chaise lounge'. Similar, if not identical to, a day bed, fainting couch, or récamier.
- Chesterfield chair, a low club-style chair with a fully buttoned or tufted interior, typically made of leather
- Chiavari chair, designed in 1870 by Giuseppe Gaetano Descalzi of Chiavari in Italy. The chair is lightweight, has elegant lines, yet is strong, practical and easy to handle.
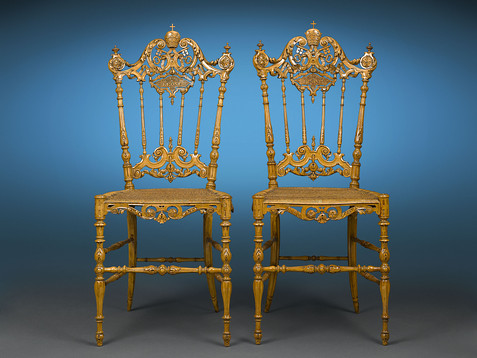
  Pope Leo XIII Chiavari chairs
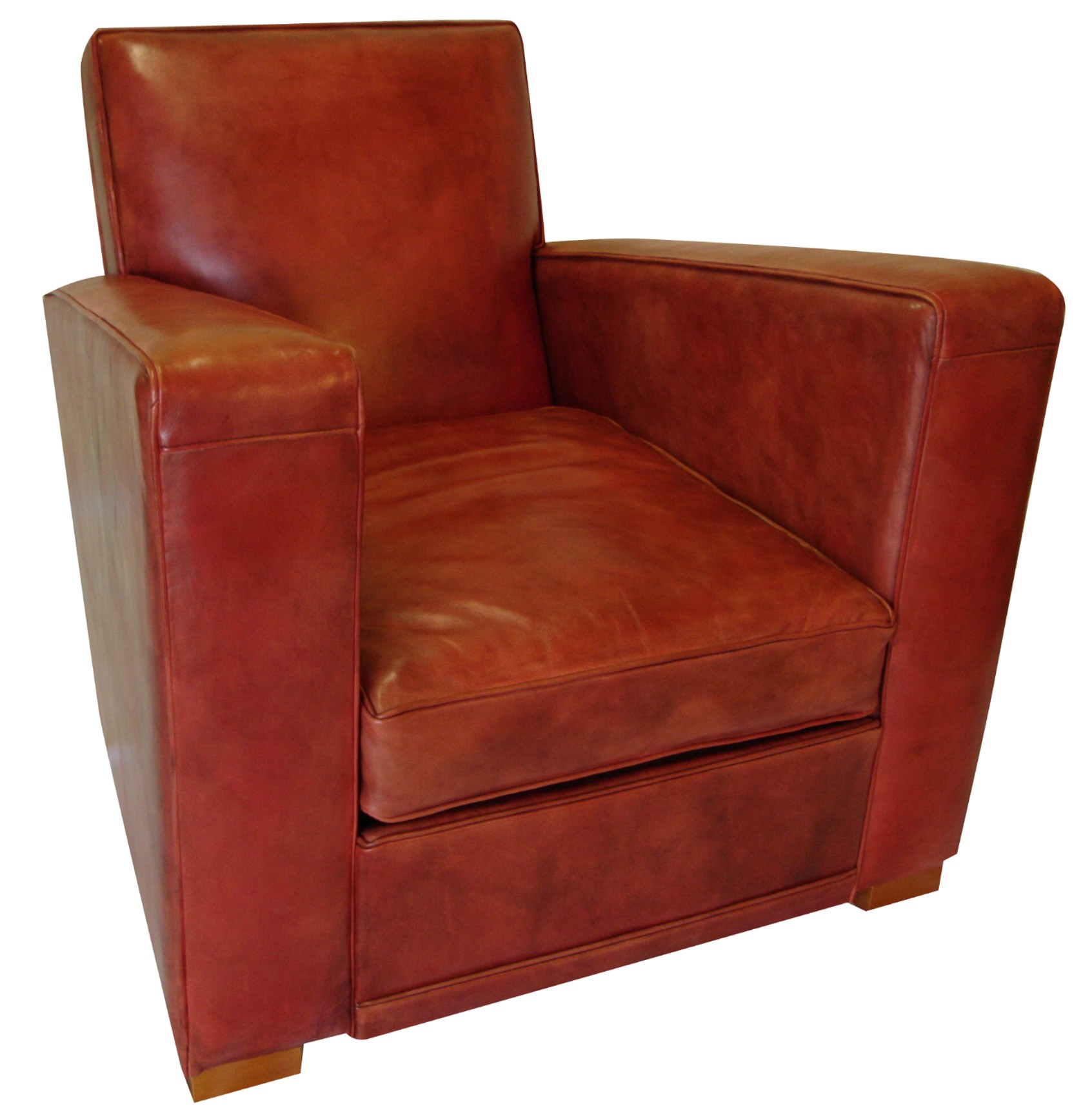
- Club chair
  Club chair, a plush easy chair with a low back. The heavy sides form armrests that are usually as high as the back. The modern club chair is based upon the club chairs used by the popular and fashionable urban gentlemen's clubs of 1850s England.
- Cockfighting chair, an 18th-century chair for libraries where the seat and arms were shaped so that a reader could sit astride to use a small desk attached to the back. Despite its popular name a sketch from 1794 in the Gillow archives lists it as a "Reading Chair".
- Coconut chair, 1955 design by George Nelson for Herman Miller
- Cogswell chair, a brand of upholstered easy chairs. It has a sloping back and curved and ornamental front legs. The armrests are open underneath.
- Commode chair, a chair with the discreet functionality of a toilet for people with limited mobility.
- Corner chair, made to fit into a corner and has a rectangular base with a high back on two adjacent sides; one sits with legs straddling a corner of the base

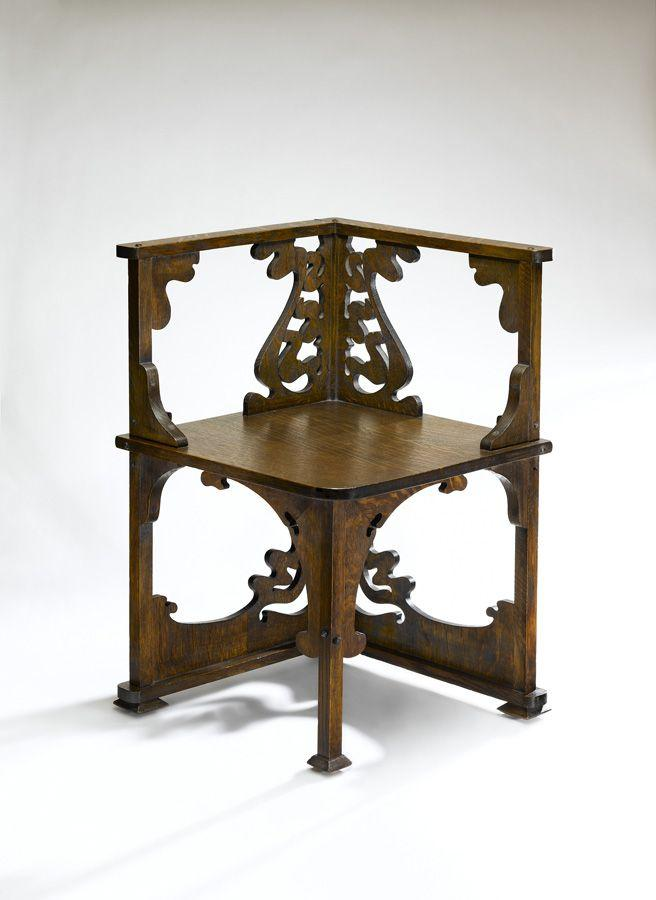
Corner chair by Charles Rohlfs

- Coronation Chair, an ancient wooden chair on which British monarchs sit when they are invested with regalia and crowned at their coronations.
- Curule chair was a folding cross-framed seat that developed hieratic significance in Republican Rome. The shape of its legs was revived in the Empire style.

== D ==
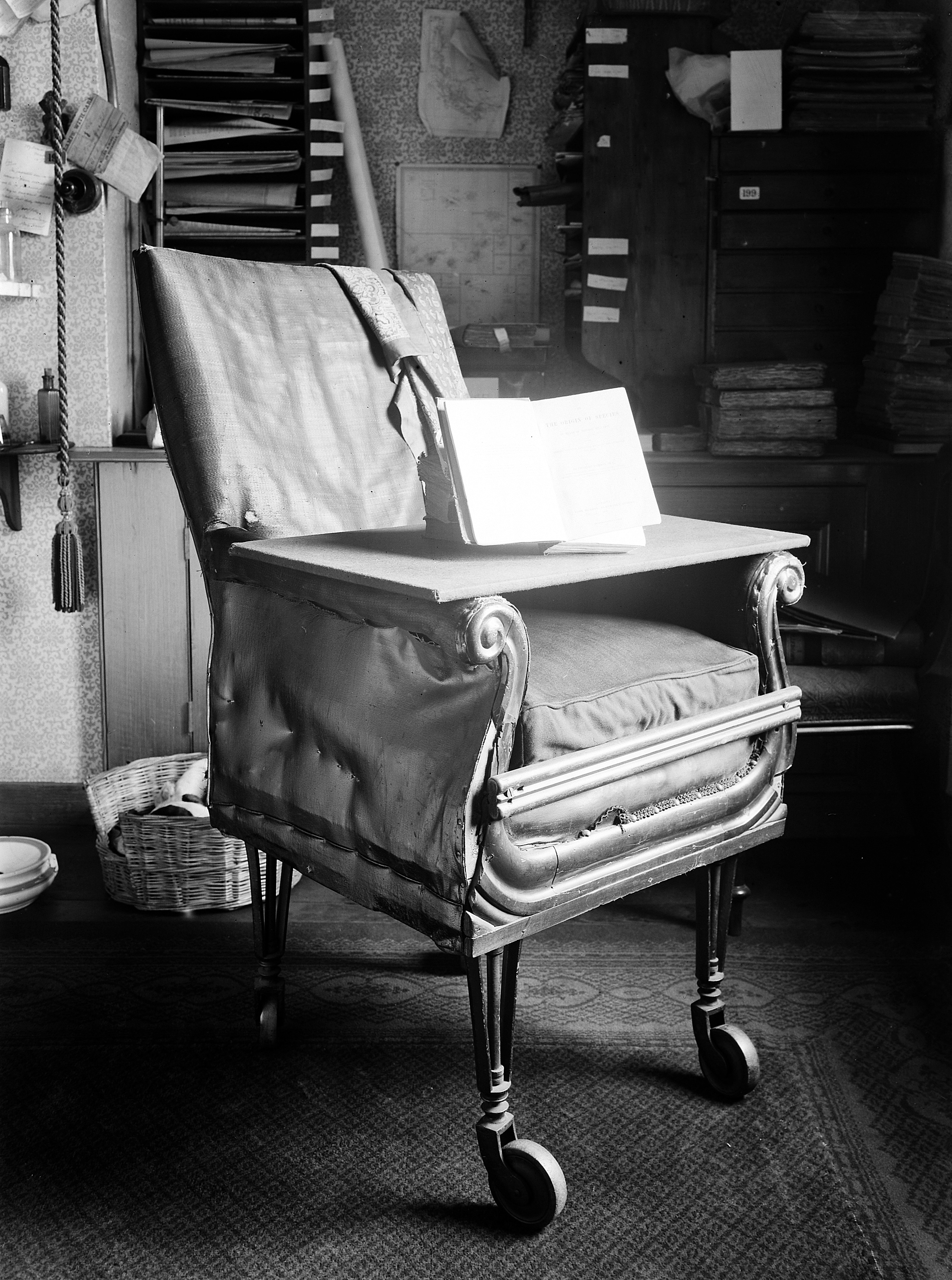
Charles Darwin's wheeled office chair (c. 1835)

- Darwin's writing chair, a wheeled armchair used to glide from one specimen to another in his Kent study.
- Dante chair, similar to the Savonarola Chair with a more solid frame and a cushioned seat
- Deckchair, a chair with a fabric or vinyl back and seat that folds flat by a scissors action round a transverse axis. The fabric extends from the sitter's feet to head. It may have an extended seat that is meant to be used as a leg rest and may have armrests. It was originally designed for passenger lounging while aboard ocean liners or ships.
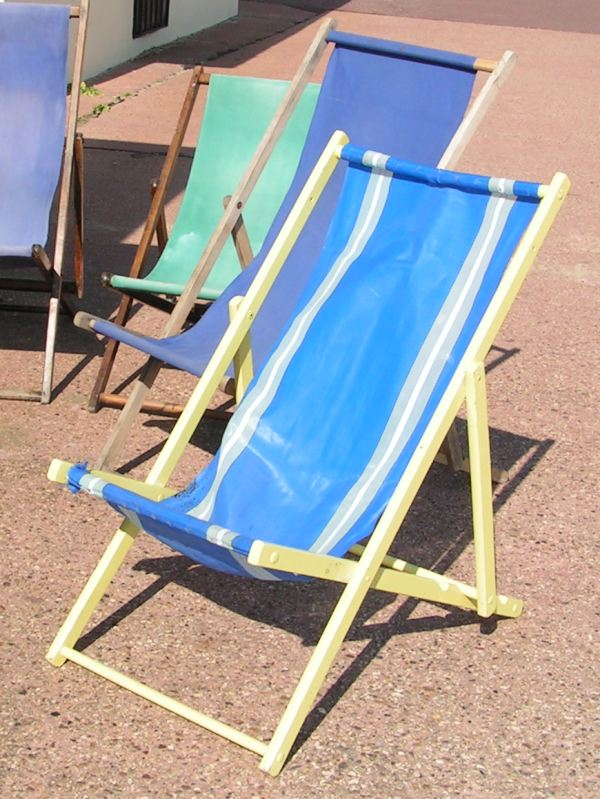
  Deck chairs
- Dentist chair, a deeply reclining chair to allow the dentist easy access to the patient's mouth. The reclining position adjusts as well as the overall height of the chair. Associated with the chair are usually a variety of dental equipment, often including a small tap and sink for the patient to rinse his or her mouth.
- Dining chair, designed to be used at a dining table; typically, dining chairs are part of a dining set, where the chairs and table feature similar or complementary designs. The oldest known depiction of dining chairs is a seventh-century BCE bas-relief of an Assyrian king and queen on very high chairs.
- Diamond Lounge Chair, designed by Harry Bertoia for Knoll
- Director's chair, a lightweight chair that folds side-to-side with a scissors action. The seat and back are made of canvas or a similar strong fabric which bears the user's full weight and can be folded; the frame is made of wood, or sometimes metal or plastic. The seat and scissors members work together to support and distribute the sitter's weight so that the seat is comfortably taut. The back is usually low and the chair usually has armrests. The stereotypical image of a movie director on location includes one of these chairs, hence the name. Victor Papanek describes this chair as an excellent design in his book Design for the Real World as it is simple and ideally suited to its function. The design goes back to coffer-makers' chairs of the 15th century and eventually to the Roman curule chair.
- Djinn chair, 1960s design by French designer Olivier Mourgue.

== E ==
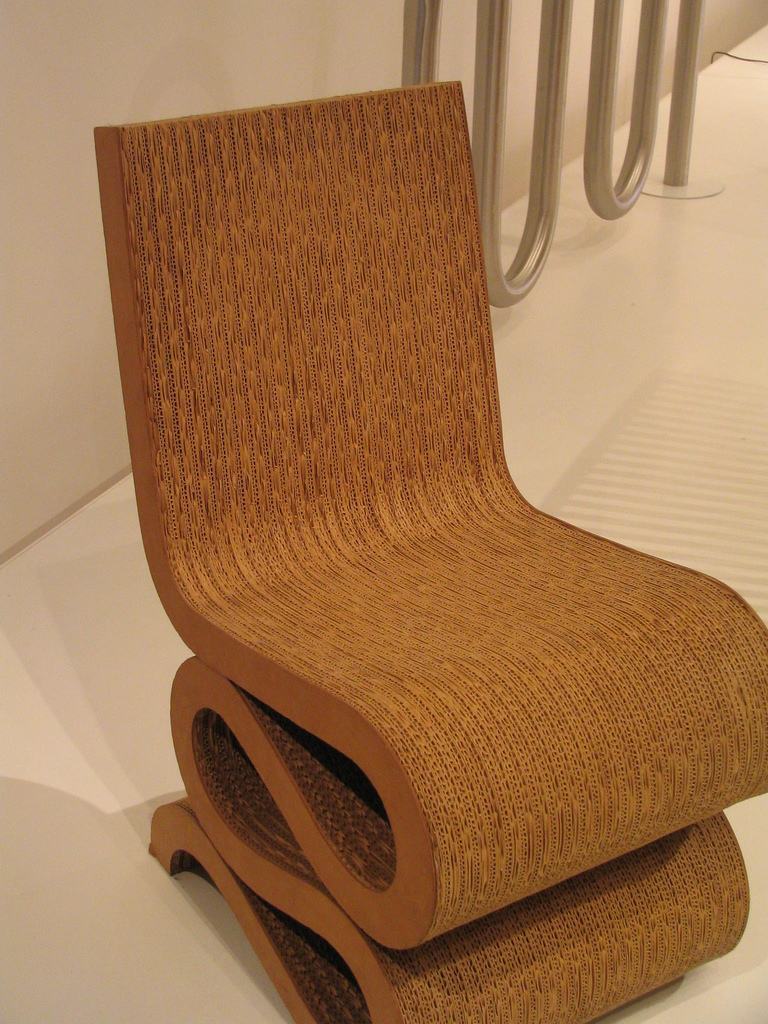
Easy Edges side chair by Frank Gehry

- Easy chair, large, soft, and very comfortable; usually upholstered
- Easy Edges, chair made of corrugated cardboard designed by architect Frank Gehry
- Eames Aluminum Group, designed by Charles and Ray Eames, sold beginning in 1958
- Eames Fiberglass Armchair, designed by Charles and Ray Eames, sold beginning in 1950
- Eames Lounge Chair, a trademark for molded plywood chairs, contoured to fit the shape of a person
- Eames Lounge Chair Wood, an easy chair designed by Charles and Ray Eames during the 1940s
- Egg chair, designed by Arne Jacobsen for Fritz Hansen resembles an egg
- Electric chair, a device for capital punishment by electrocution; a high-backed chair with arms and restraints, usually made of oak
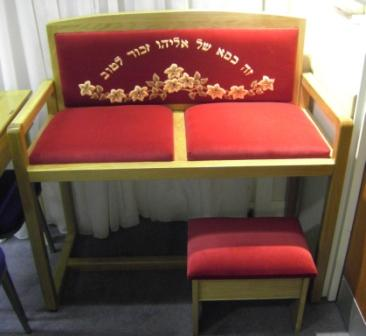
- An example of an Elijah's chair, used at Jewish circumcisions
  Elijah's chair, a chair set aside for the prophet Elijah at Jewish circumcision ceremonies
- Emeco 1006, a durable aluminum chair original developed for the US Navy

== F ==
- Farthingale chair, an armless chair with a wide seat covered in usually high-quality fabric and fitted with a cushion. The backrest is an upholstered panel, with legs that are straight and rectangular. It was introduced as a chair for ladies in the late 16th century and was named in England, probably in the 19th century, for its ability to accommodate the exceptionally wide-hooped skirts fashionable of the time.
- Fauteuil, an open-arm chair with considerable exposed wood, originating in 18th-century France
- Fiddleback chair, a wooden chair of the Empire period, usually with an upholstered seat, in which the splat resembles a fiddle
- A fighting chair is a chair on a boat used by anglers to catch large saltwater fish. The chair typically swivels and has a harness to keep the angler strapped in should the fish tug hard on the line.
- Flax Chair by Christien Meindertsma is made of biodegradable material derived from flax.
- Floating tensegrity chair by Manfred Kielnhofer, ARTPARK 2020
- Folding chair, collapses in some way for easy storage and transport. Various folding chairs have their own names (e.g., deckchair, director's chair), but a chair described simply as a folding chair folds a rigid frame and seat around a transverse axis so that the seat becomes parallel to the back and the frame collapses with a scissors action. Some further collapse the feet up to the back. Folding chairs may be designed to stack on top of each other when folded and may come with special trolleys to move stacks of folded chairs. Folding chairs are sometimes used in professional wrestling as weapons.
- Folding seat, a fixed seat on a bus, a tram or a passenger car

== G ==
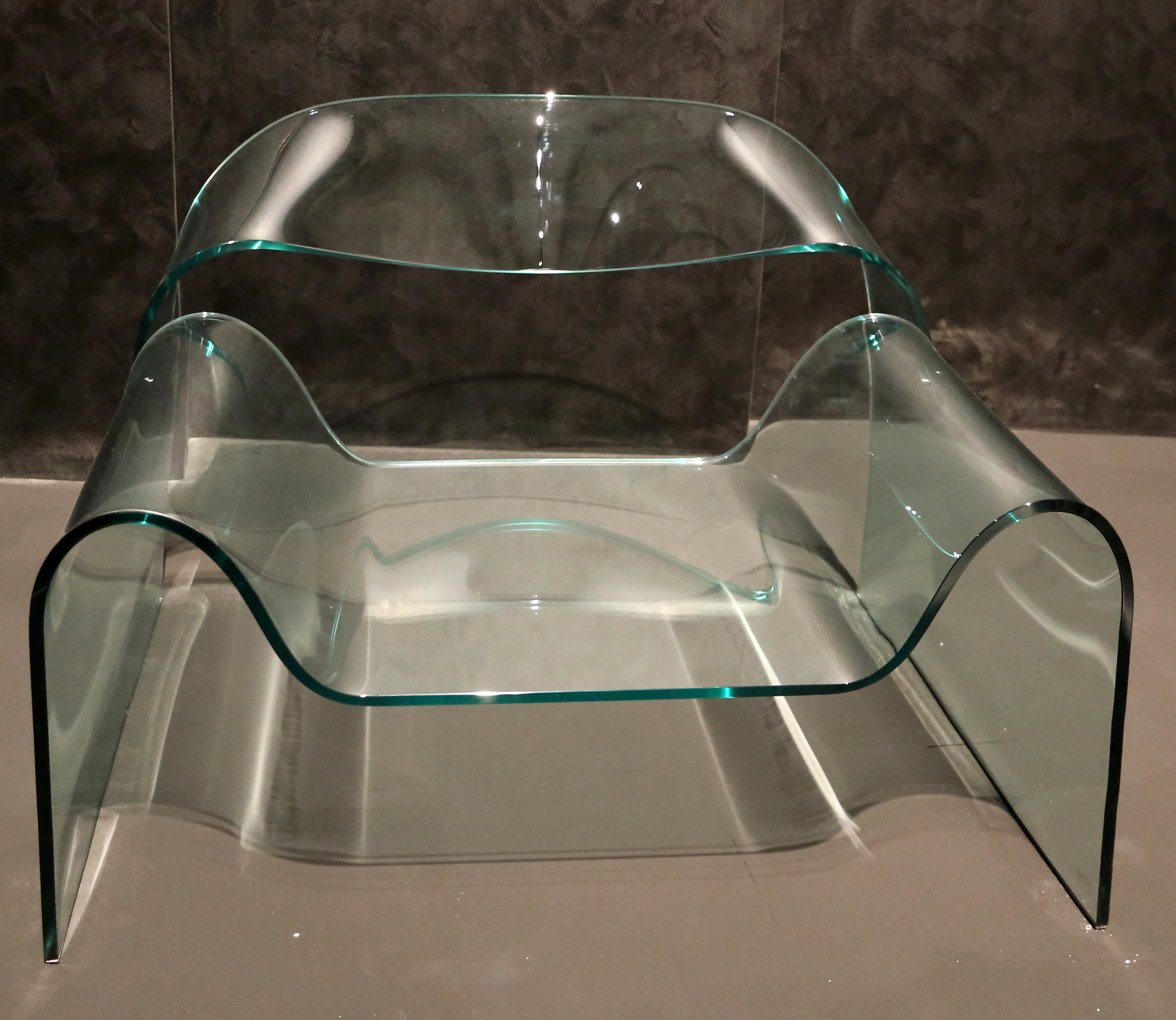
Ghost chair designed for Fiam (1987)

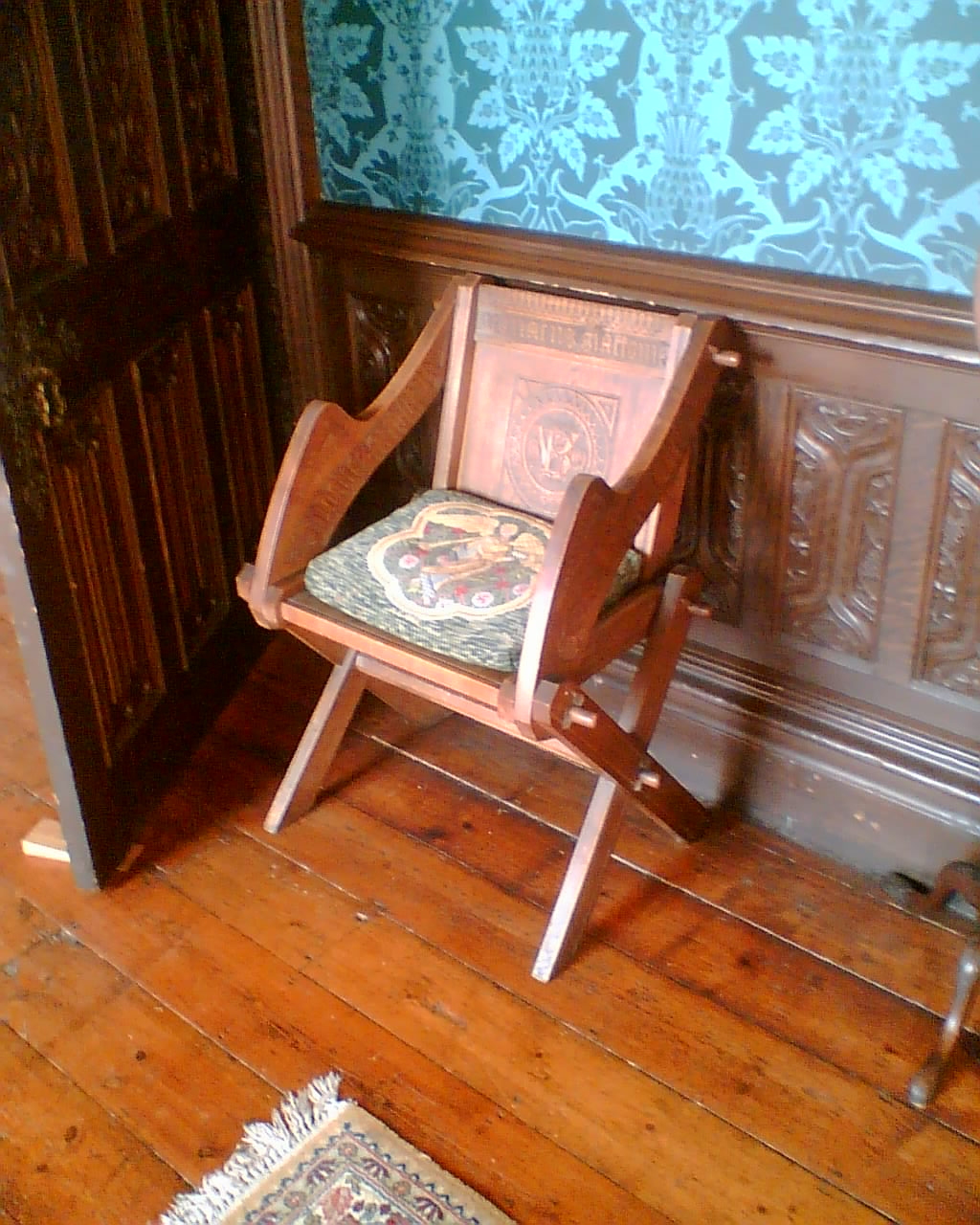
A reproduction Glastonbury chair in the Bishop's Palace, Wells

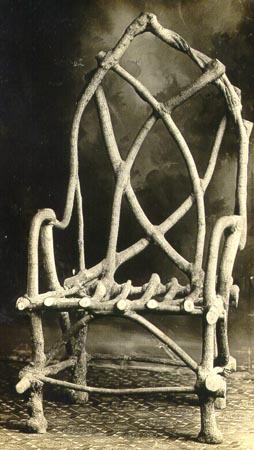
Grown chair

- Gainsborough chair, an armchair with a high back, open sides and short arms
- Gaming chair, legless, curved/L-shaped, generally upholstered, and sometimes contains built-in electronic devices like loudspeakers and vibration to enhance the video game experience; the five main types of gaming chairs are bean bags, rockers, pedestals, racers, and cockpits
- Garden Egg chair, designed by Peter Ghyczy and a modernist classic
- Ghost, all glass armchair designed by Cini Boeri and Tomu Katayanagi for Fiam Italia
- GJ Chair (No. 9-1), laminated wood chair by Grete Jalk for Poul Jeppesen
- Glastonbury chair, a wooden chair with flat seat and sloping back; design dates from at least the early Middle Ages
- Glider (or platform rocker), offers the same motions as a rocking chair but without the dangers; a frame rests on the floor and the chair is supported by swing arms within the frame so that moving parts are less accessible
- Gossip bench or telephone table, an early 20th century chair with a built-in telephone stand
- Grand Confort, designed by Charlotte Perriand, Le Corbusier, and Pierre Jeanneret in 1928
- Grand Prix, designed by Arne Jacobsen in 1957
- Grown chairs, using shaping of living trees and other woody plants to create structures

== H ==
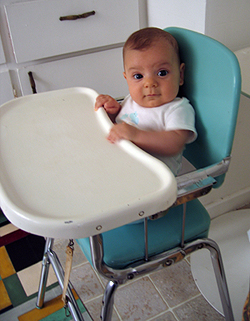
High chair by Cosco (1957)

- HÅG Capisco, an atypical office chair designed by Peter Opsvik
- Handkerchief Chair, designed by Lella and Massimo Vignelli for Knoll in 1983
- Harkonnen Chair, designed by H. R. Giger initially for an unproduced movie version of Dune
- Hassock, an upholstered seat that is low to the ground and has no backrest
- High chair, a children's chair to raise them to the height of adults for feeding. They typically come with a detachable tray so that the child can sit apart from the main table. Booster chairs raise the height of children on regular chairs so they can eat at the main dining table. Some high chairs are clamped directly to the table and thus are more portable.
- Hanging Egg Chair, designed by Danish furniture designer Nanna Ditzel in 1957
- Hepplewhite chair, English furniture designer and cabinet maker George Hepplewhite active in the 1700s (see also: Thomas Sheraton and Thomas Chippendale)

== I ==
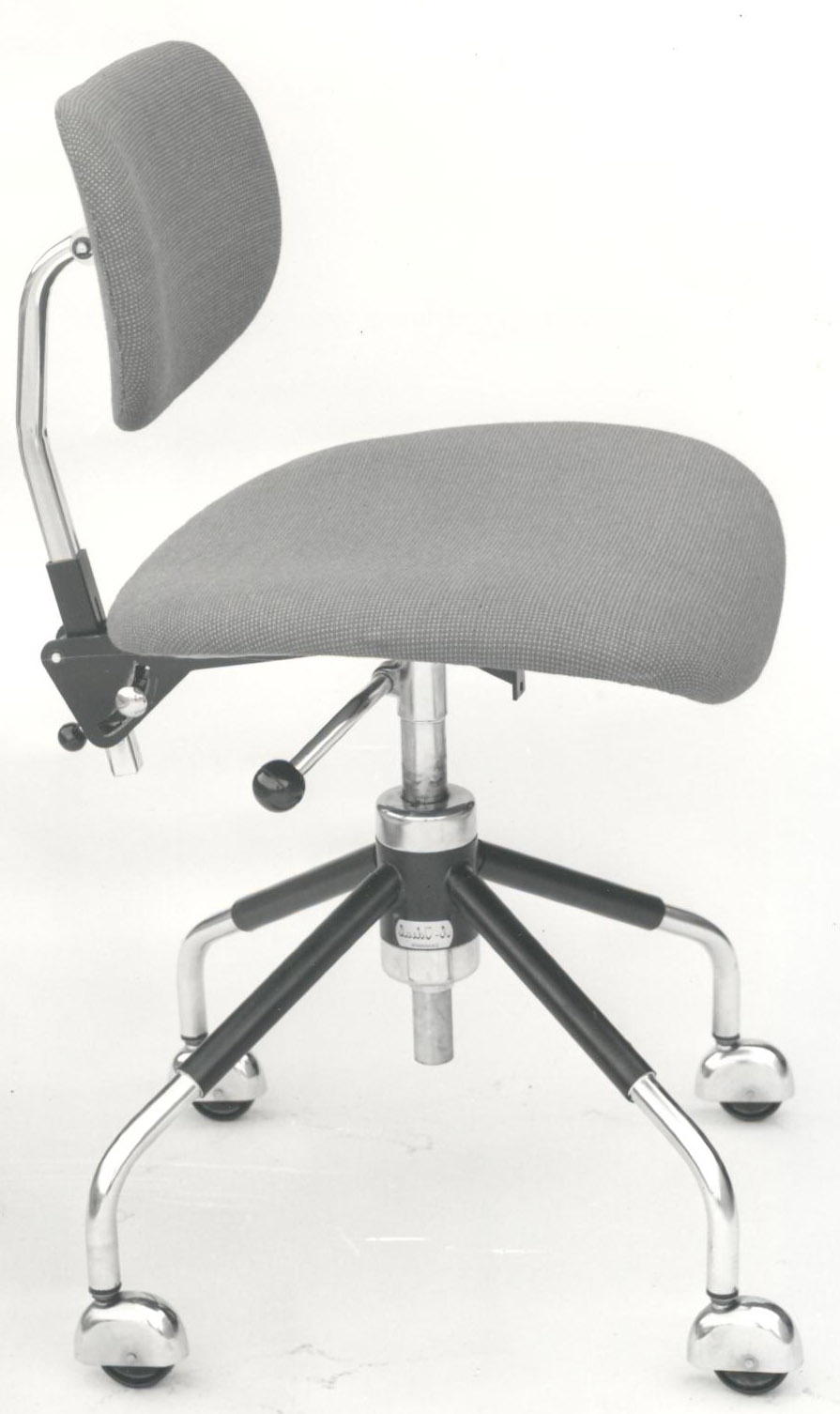
Ideal A task chair by Vermund Larsen (1960s)

- Ideal A, office task chair designed by Vermund Larsen
- Inflatable chair, usually children's toys made out of plastic; IKEA briefly marketed them as serious furniture upholstered in fabric; some are designed for use as floating lounge chairs in swimming pools.
- Iquo chair, an indoor-outdoor stacking chair by Ini Archibong for Knoll
- Ironing chair, a lightly built folding chair usually with a metal frame and small padded seat and either a minimal padded back or a simple tubular loop back. The chair is usually used as a 'perch', a support for carrying out an activity – such as ironing – by people with disabilities or back problems, but they are also popular with anyone requiring a light supporting chair for extended periods, such as observing through a telescope.
- Ironrite Health Chair, 1930s flatpack design for an ironing chair manufactured by the Ironrite Ironer company

== J ==
- Jack and Jill, similar to the Adirondack chair, but consists of two of them joined in the middle by a table
- Donald Judd chairs, early 1970s minimalist furniture by artist Donald Judd
- Jump seat, auxiliary seat in airplanes and other vehicles

== K ==
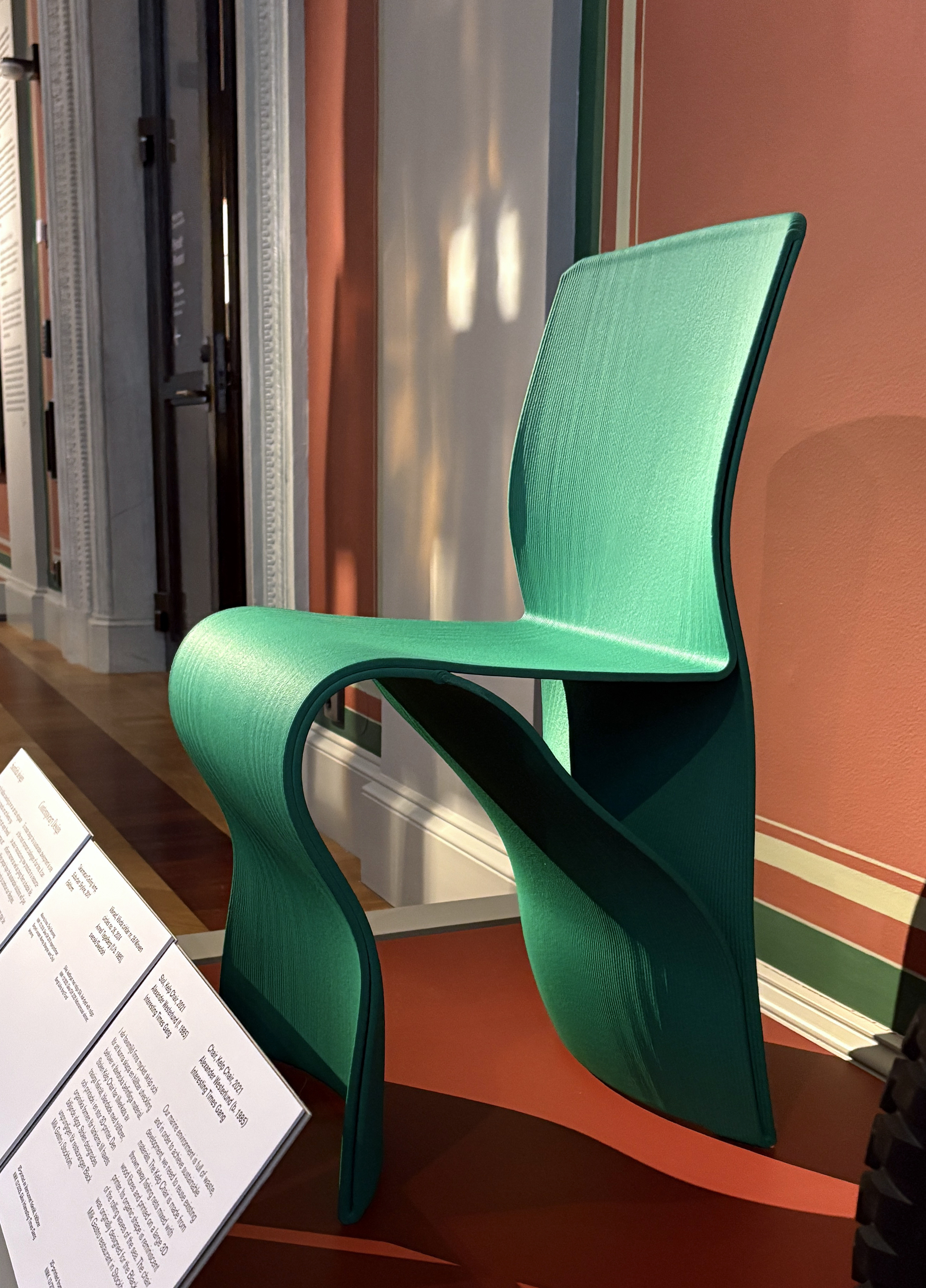
Kelp Chair by Alexander Westerlund (2021)

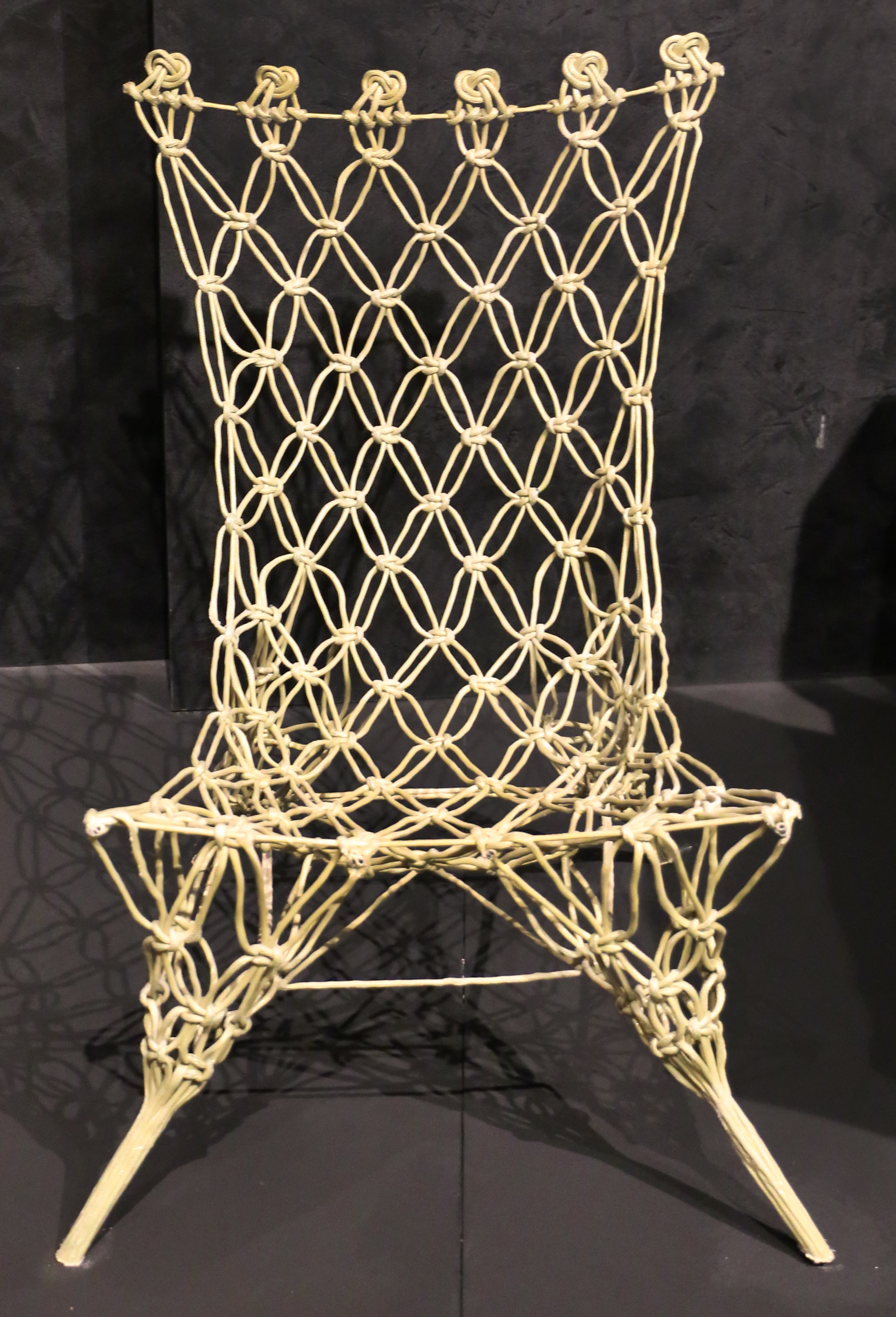
Knotted chair by Marcel Wanders (1995)

- Kelp Chair, designed by Alexander Westerlund in 2021 and made from recycled fishing-net plastic and wood fibre using large-scale 3D printing.
- Kneeling chairs or knee-sit chairs, meant to support someone kneeling. This is purportedly better for the back than sitting all day. The main seat is sloped forward at about 30 degrees so that the person would normally slide off, but there is a knee rest to keep the person in place.
- Knotted chair, designed by Marcel Wanders in 1995 for Droog design (later manufactured by Cappellini)

== L ==
- Ladder Chair, a 1920s children's stepladder and seat by Erich Dieckmann
- Ladderback chair, a wooden arm or side chair in which the horizontal elements of the back give the appearance of a ladder; typically described by the number of such elements; a 'five-back', a 'three-back'; on better examples, the width of these elements is graduated, wider to narrower, top to bottom
- Lambing chair, a wood "box" form of winged arm chair rarely having upholstery. Storage under the seat is common as a drawer or compartment.
- Larkin Administration Building chair by Frank Lloyd Wright
- Lawn chair, usually a light, folding chair for outdoor use on soft surfaces. The left and right legs are joined along the ground into a single foot to make a broader contact area with the ground. Individual feet would otherwise dig into soft grass.
- La-Z-Boy, reclining chair brand
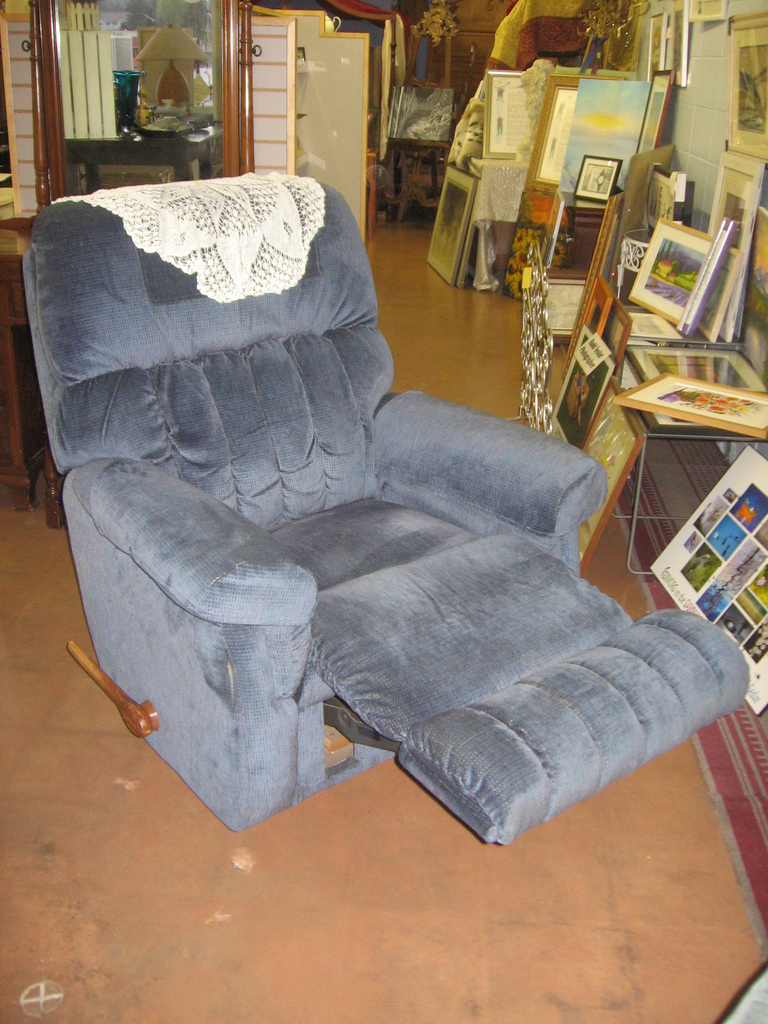
  La-Z-Boy chair
- LessThanFive Chair, lightweight carbon fibre chair by Michael Young for Steelcase
- Lifeguard chairs, enable a lifeguard to sit on a high perch at the beach to better look for swimmers in distress
- Lift chair, a powered lifting mechanism that pushes the entire chair up from its base, allowing the user to easily move to a standing position
- Litter, also known as "sedan chair", a covered chair carried by people and used to transport others
- Lockheed Lounge designed by Marc Newson
- Louis Ghost chair, a transparent polycarbonate design by Philippe Starck for Kartell
- Louis Seize (XVI) armchair

== M ==
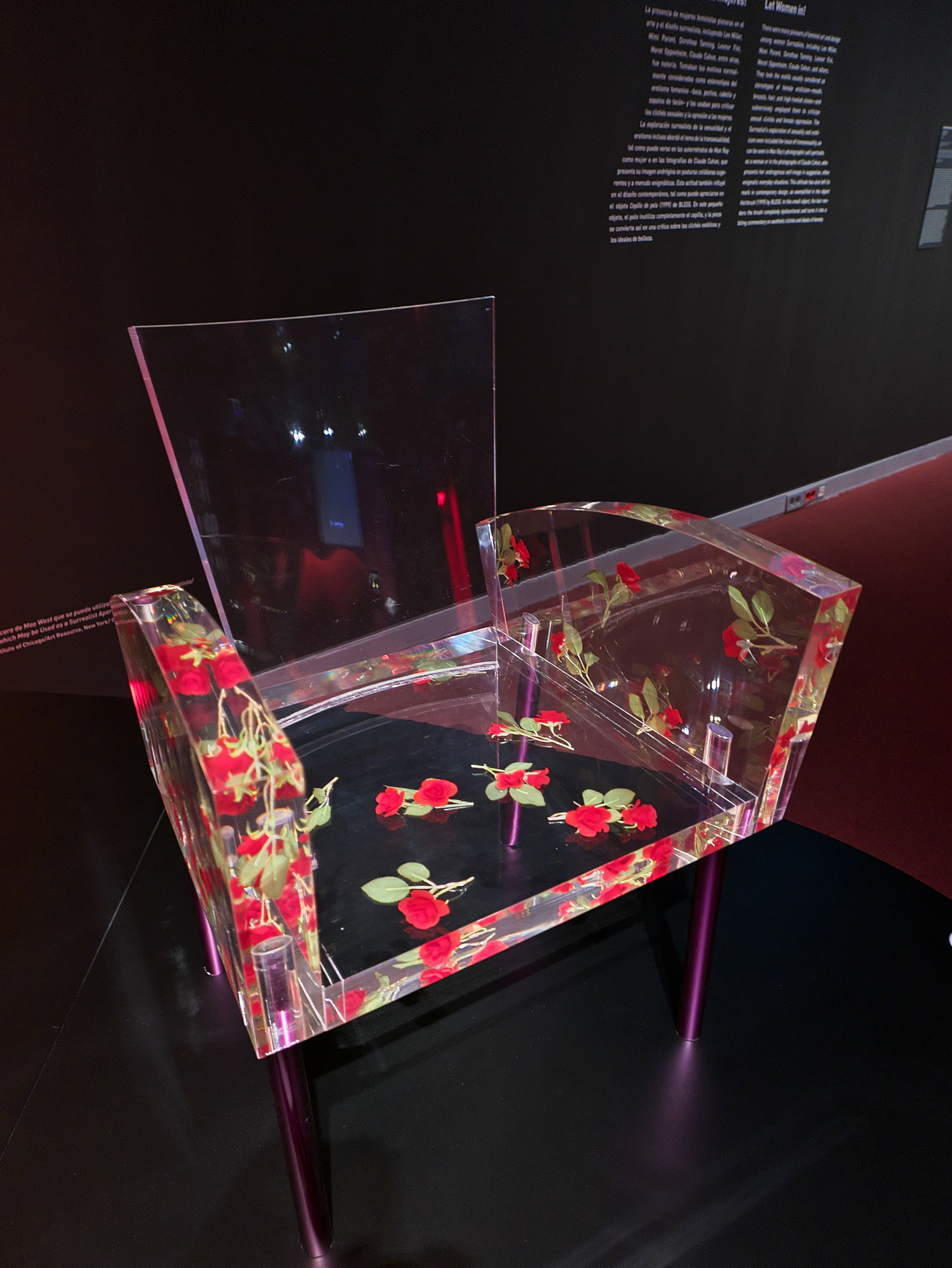
Miss Blanche chair, Shiro Kuramata

- Mackintosh chairs
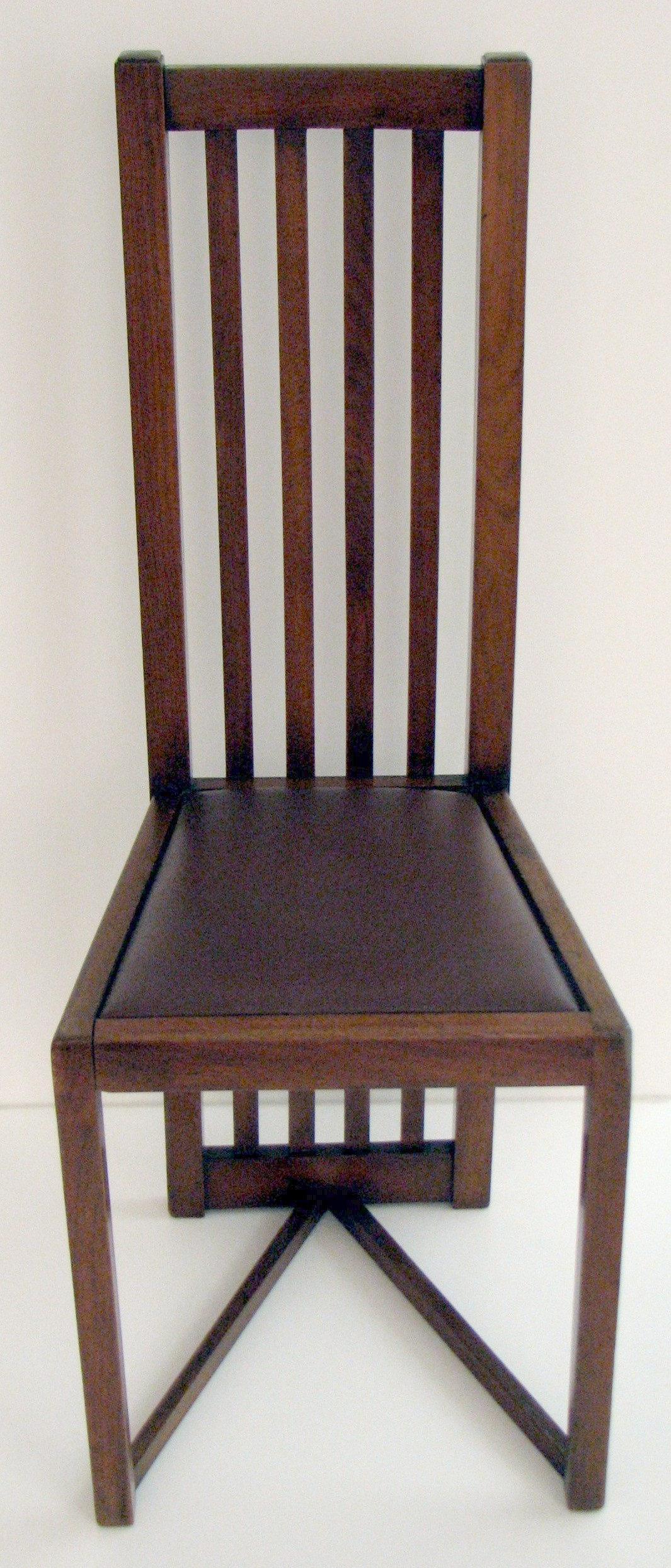
  Charles Rennie Mackintosh Chair (1917)
- Massage chair, has electromechanical devices to massage the occupant. Another kind of massage chair is one used by a therapist on which the client sits in an inverted position with the back facing the massage therapist. There is a headrest like that of the common massage table for the face.
- Mezzadro seat, an unconventional chair by Achille and Pier Giacomo Castiglioni for Zanotta.

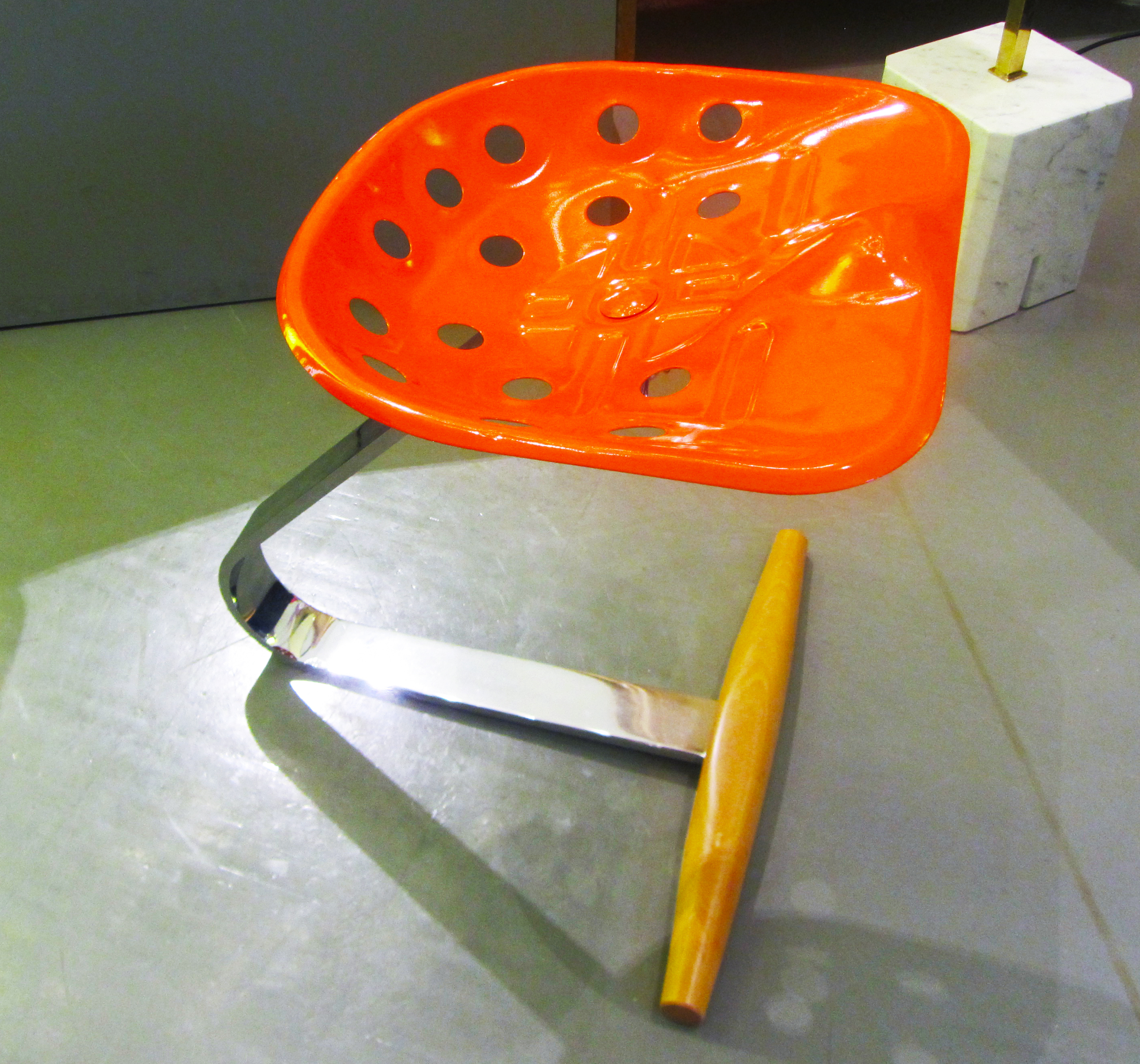
Mezzadro Seat by Achille e Pier Giacomo Castiglioni (1957)

- Ming chair
- Mirra chair, designed by Studio 7.5 in 2003
- Miss Blanche by Shiro Kuramata
- Monobloc chair, a cheap, light-weight, stackable, weatherproof, easily cleaned, single-piece polypropylene chair designed for mass production via injection molding
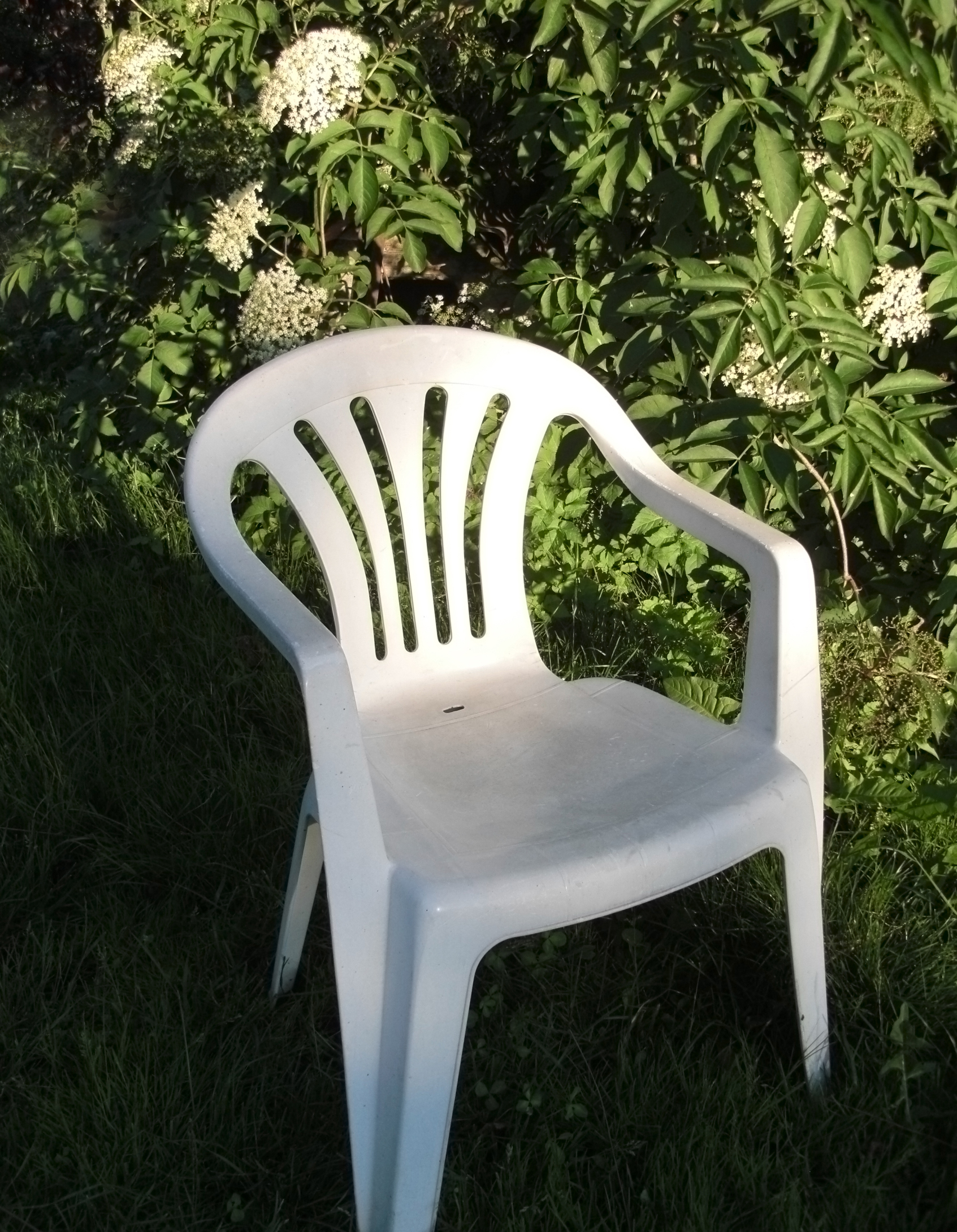
  Monobloc chair
- Morris chair, a proprietary easy chair with adjustable back, cushions, and armrests
- Muskoka chair, another name for an Adirondack chair, particularly in Canada

== N ==
- Navy chair, a durable all-aluminum chair originally developed for the US Navy
- No. 14 chair, the most famous bentwood sidechair originally made by the Gebrüder Thonet chair company of Germany in the 19th century, and widely copied and popular today
- Nursing chair, a low-seated partially upholstered chair used in Victorian times, with emphasis on a woman breast-feeding an infant

== O ==
- Office chair, typically swivels, tilts, and rolls about on casters, or small wheels. It may be very plushly upholstered and in leather and thus characterized as an "executive chair", or come with a low back and be called a steno chair. Office chairs often have a number of ergonomic adjustments: seat height, armrest height and width, and back reclining tension. They are also known as a Task chairs.
- Orbiter, a brand of camera seat used by camera operators that swivels at a low working height.
- ON Chair, has a patented three-dimensional sitting arrangement; incorporates lateral movement to standard office chair height and reclining positions
- Ottoman, a thick cushion used as a seat or a low stool, or as a rest for the feet of a seated person
- Ovalia Egg Chair, similar to the Ball Chair but egg-shaped; designed by Henrik Thor-Larsen in 1968
- Onit chair, a chair which is also a set of steps and an ironing board.

== P ==
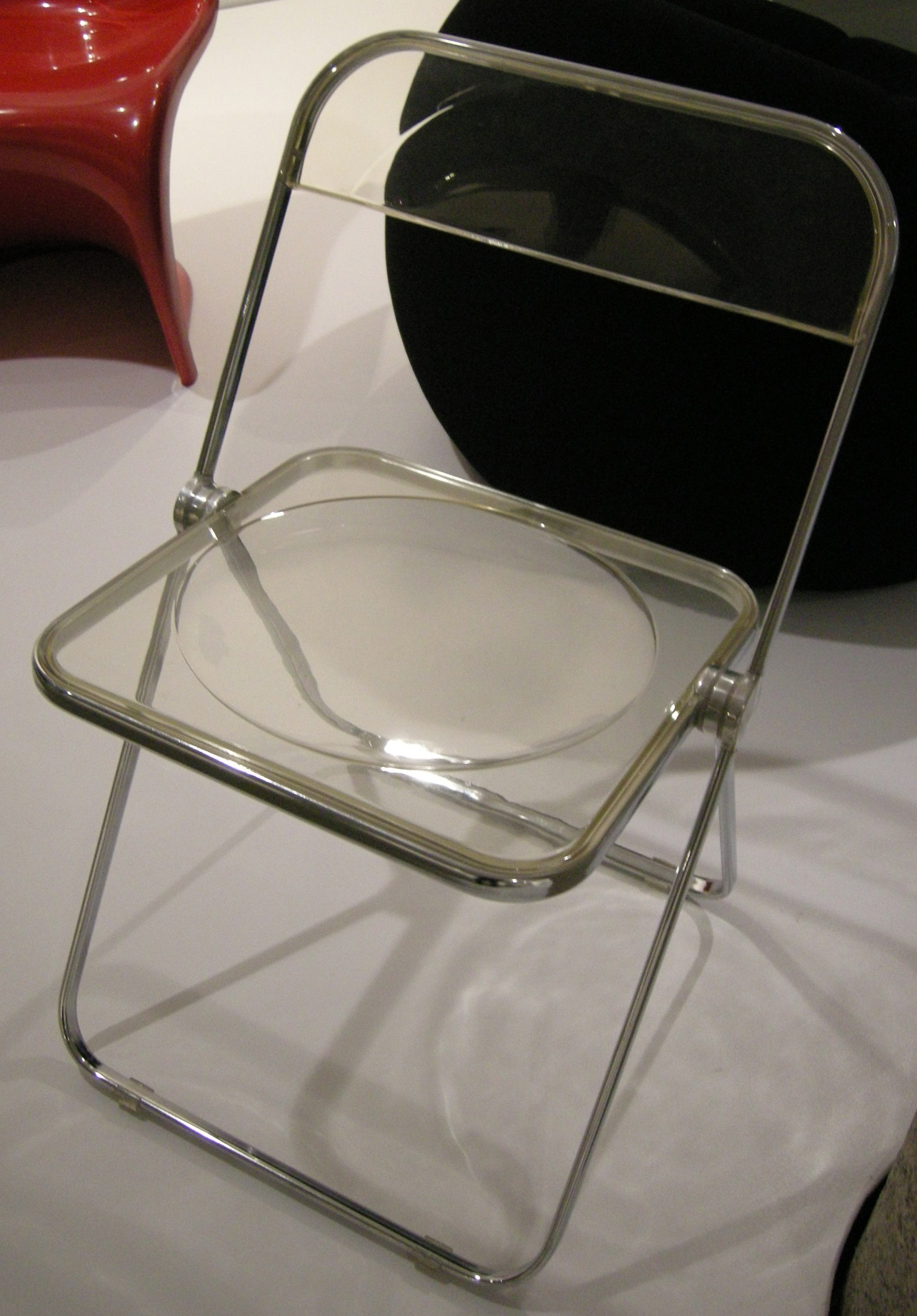
Plia folding chair by Giancarlo Piretti (1967)

- Paimio chair, a bent plywood lounge chair by Alvar Aalto
- Panton Chair, a one-piece plastic chair by Danish designer Verner Panton
- Papasan chair, a large, rounded, bowl-shaped chair with an adjustable angle similar to that of a futon; the bowl rests in an upright frame made of sturdy wicker or wood originally from the Philippines
- Paper tube chair by Manfred Kielnhofer for Artpark
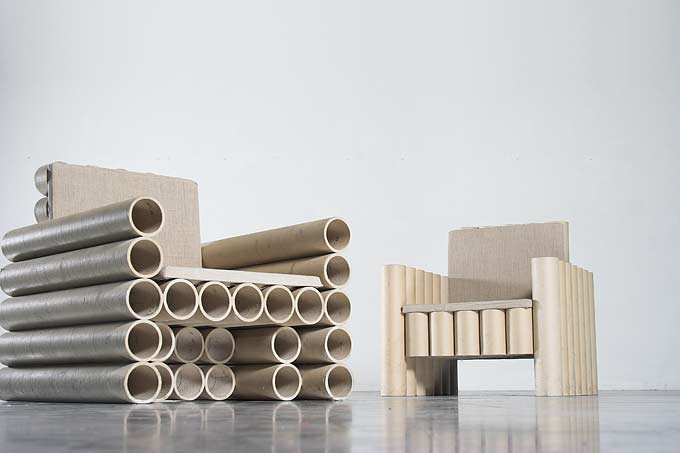
  Paper tube chair by Manfred Kielnhofer (2002)
- Parsons chair, curving wooden chair named for the Parsons School of Design in New York, where it was created and widely copied today
- Paragon chair, similar to certain types of campaign or camping chairs, and the Butterfly chair
- Peacock chair, a large wicker chair with a flared back, originating in the Philippines; also an exaggerated Windsor chair design by Hans Wegner (1947); also a chair designed by Dror studio for Cappellini
- Pew, a bench in a church
- Pew stacker chair, stackable chair used primarily by churches that allows chairs arranged in rows to be linked together in such a way that the seats and backs form a bench- or pew-like feel and appearance
- Picto chair, 1990s office chair designed by Hans Roericht for Wilkhahn
- Planter's chair, wooden chair with stretchable arms to rest the legs
- Platner Arm Chair, designed by Warren Platner for Knoll
- Plia folding chair, designed by Giancarlo Piretti for Castelli
- Poäng, a flat-pack cantilevered bentwood armchair manufactured and marketed by Ikea, with more than 30 million made since its introduction in 1978, and 1.5 million sold annually.
- Polypropylene stacking chair, designed by Robin Day in 1963
- Poofbag chair, similar to an oversized bean-bag chair filled with urethane foam
- Pop chair, a whimsical variation of a patio chair designed by Brad Ascalon
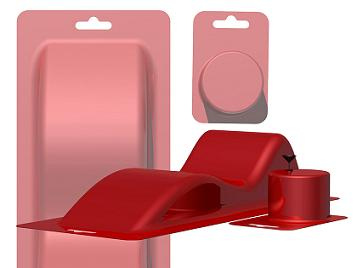
  "Pop" chair concept Patio chair (2005)
- Porter's chair or hood chair, a chair placed near the entrance of a large house for use by a servant responsible for admitting visitors (see also: 10 Downing Street Guard Chairs)
- Potty chair (often abbreviated simply as "potty"), a training toilet for children; in pre-indoor plumbing times this was a chair beneath the seat of which a chamber pot was installed
- Portuguese chair, metal outdoor armchair originally developed by the Portuguese furniture company Adico in the 1930s as the 5008 chair, becoming a symbol of the Portuguese cafe culture. The Gonçalo chair, designed by Gonçalo Rodrigues dos Santos in the 1940s, is one of the most famous derivatives of the 5008 chair.
- Pouffe, furniture used as a footstool or low seat
- Power chairs, with responsive joystick controls and a tight turning circle for elderly or disabled people to move around a house
- Pressback chair, a wooden chair of the Victorian period, usually of oak, into the crest rail and/or splat of which a pattern is pressed with a steam press
- Prie-dieu, a domestic chair resembling a prie-dieu prayer desk
- Pushchair or stroller, a chair with wheels, which usually folds for transporting an infant; some countries, including the U.S., use "stroller"; others, including the UK, "pushchair"

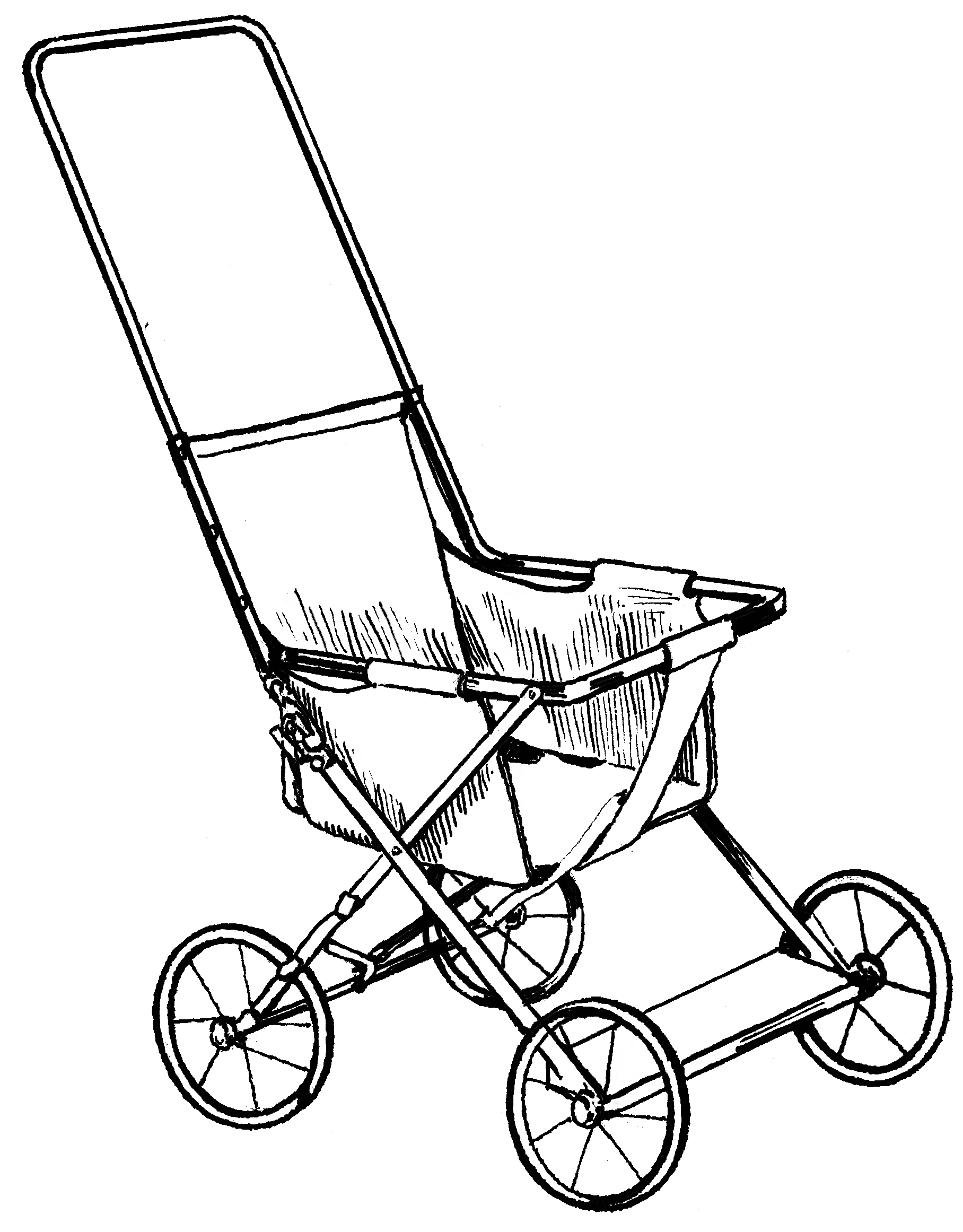
Pushchair or stroller

== Q ==
- QOR360 ergonomic chairs developed by a trauma surgeon

== R ==
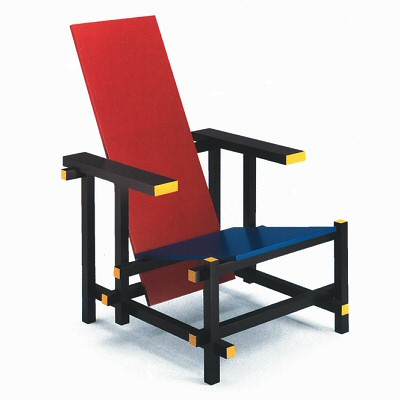
Rietveld Red and Blue chair

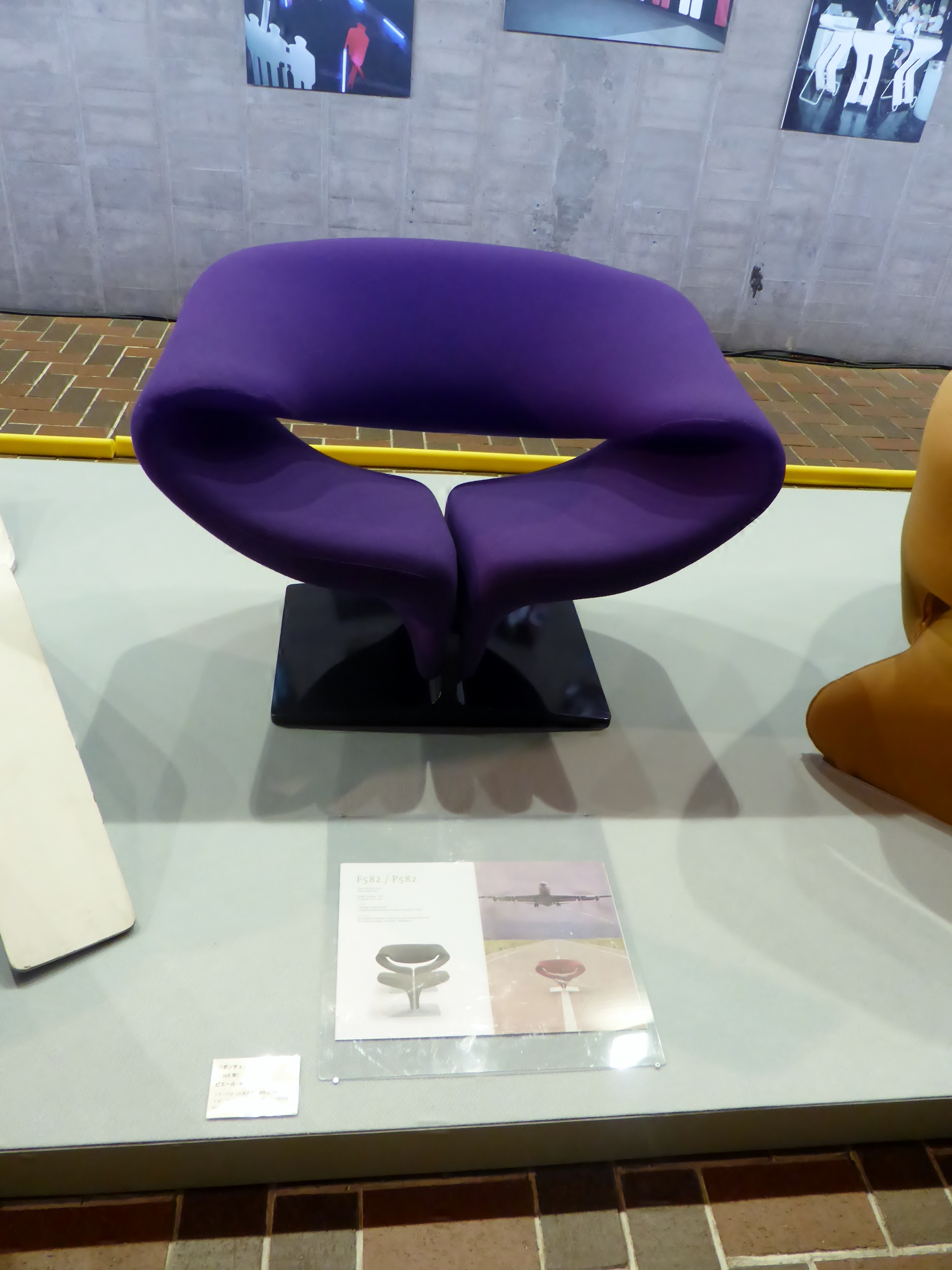
Ribbon Chair by Pierre Paulin

- Recliner, a chair with a reclining back; most are armchairs and may come with a footrest that unfolds when the back is reclined
- Red and Blue Chair a chair designed by Dutch architect and furniture designer Gerrit Rietveld.
- Resilient Chair, designed by Eva Zeisel for Hudson Fixtures (1948)
- Restraint chair, a type of physical restraint used to prevent injury to themselves or others
- Revolving chair, an older term for swivel chair
- Rex chair, a foldable chair designed by Slovene designer Niko Kralj in 1952
- Rey Chair, designed by Swiss designer Bruno Rey for Dietiker in 1971
- Ribbon Chair (model 582), designed by Pierre Paulin in 1966.
- Ribbon Chair, designed by Niels Bendtsen in 1975. This chair is on display in a permanent collection at The Museum of Modern Art in New York.
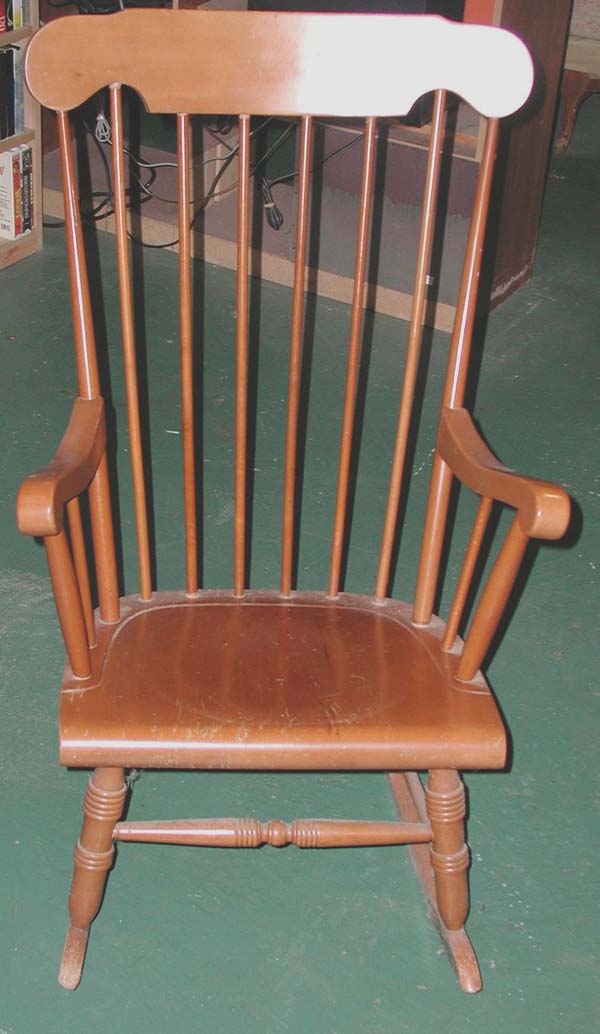
- A rocking Windsor chair
  Rocking chair (rocker), typically a wooden side chair or armchair with legs mounted on curved rockers, so that the chair can sway back and forth; sometimes the rocking chair is on springs or on a platform (a "platform rocker") to avoid crushing anything, particularly children's feet or pets' tails, that get under the rockers
- The Round Chair, designed by Hans Wegner in 1949
- Rover chair, designed by Ron Arad
- Rumble seat

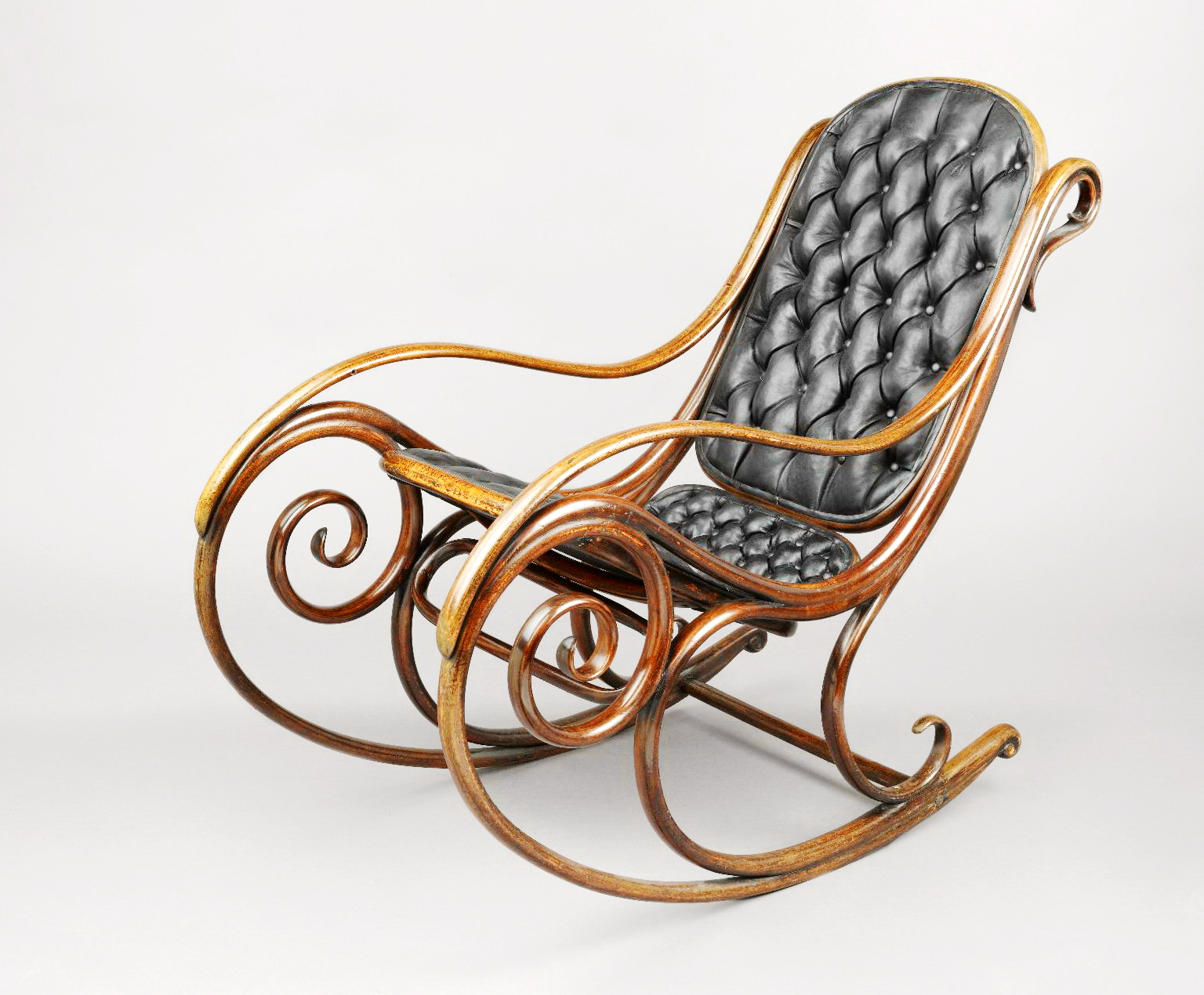
Michael Thonet Model 1 Rocking Chair

== S ==
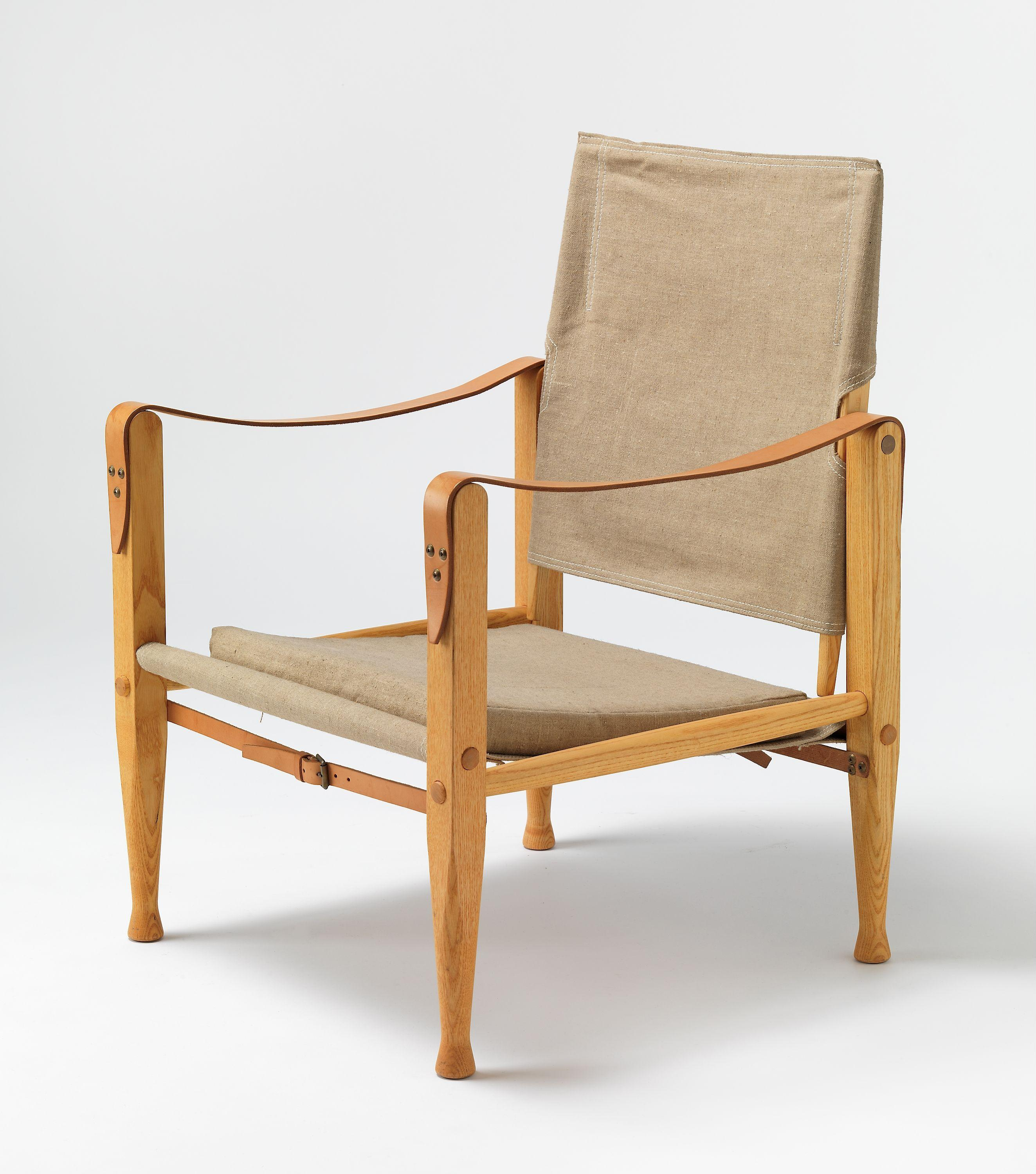
Safari chair Kaare Klint (1933)

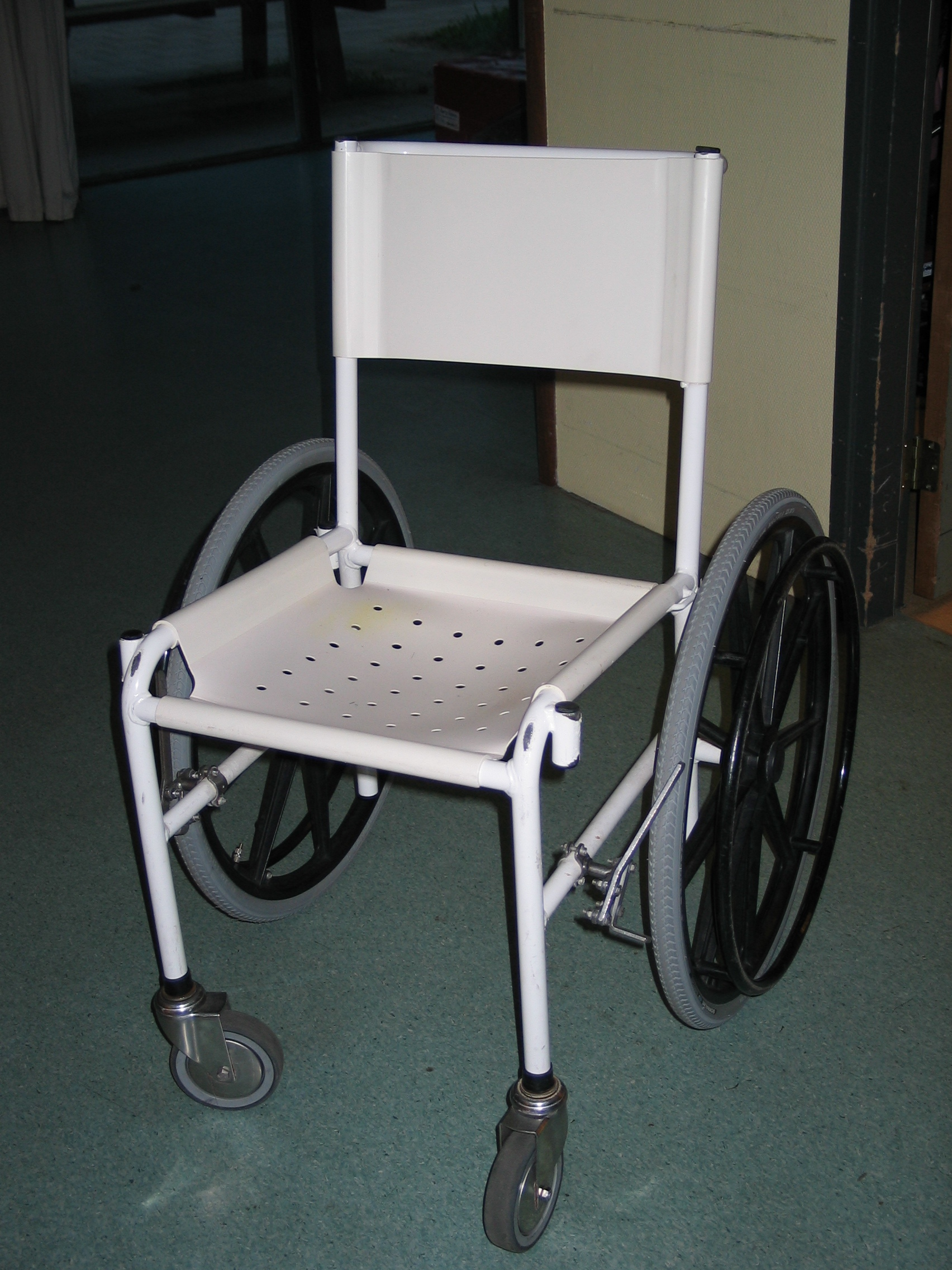
A shower chair

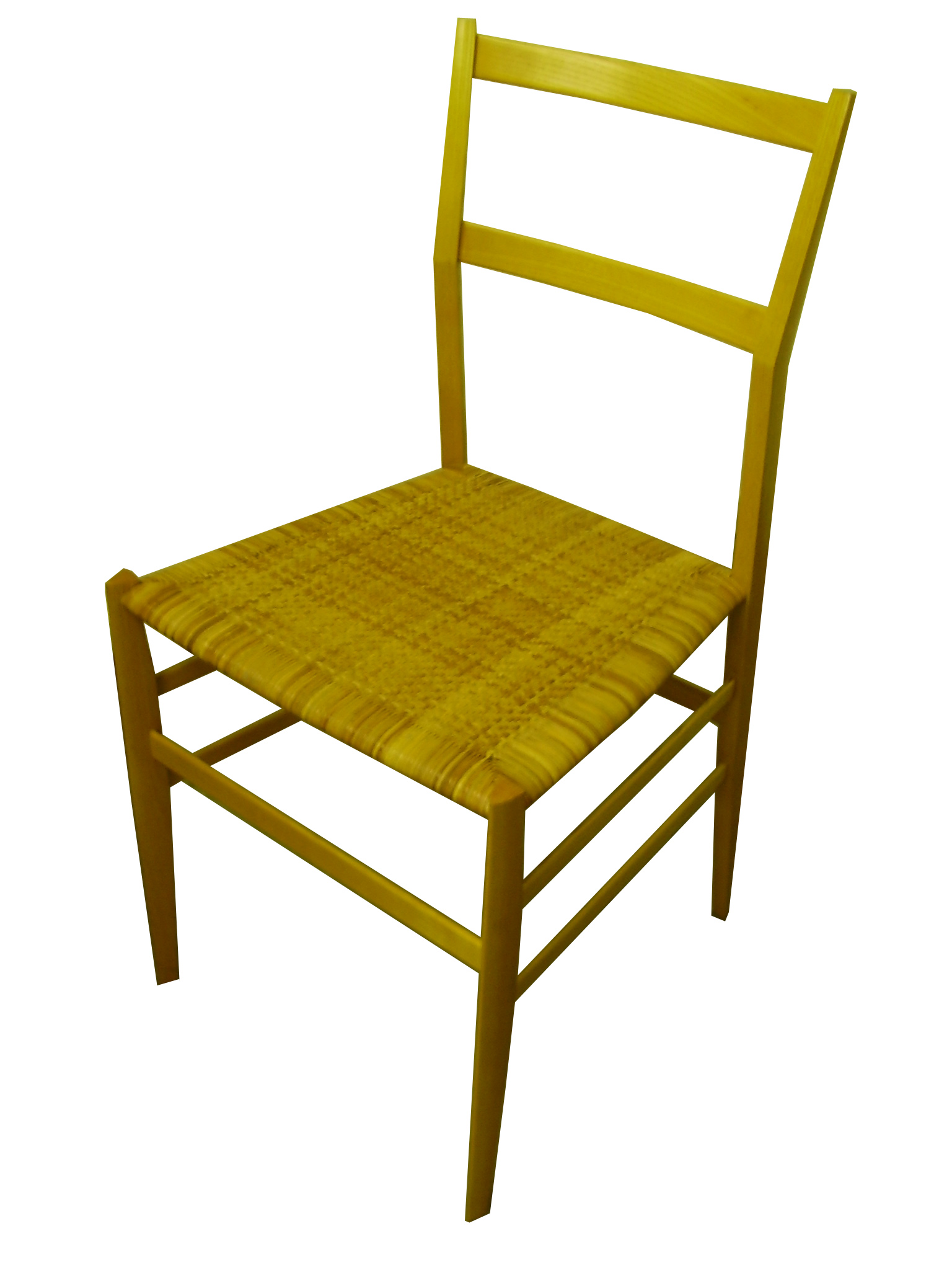
Superleggera chair by Gio Ponti for Cassina (1955)

- "S" chair, designed by Tom Dixon for Cappellini
- Saddle chair, uses the same principles in its design as an equestrian saddle; does not have a backrest but is equipped with a chair base on casters and a gas cylinder for adjusting the correct sitting height; the casters enable moving around and reaching out for i.e. tools while sitting
- Safari Chair, designed by Kaare Klint for Carl Hansen & Co.
- Savonarola chair, a folding armchair dating from the Italian Renaissance. Typically constructed of walnut, it is sometimes called an X-chair. The Savonarola chair was the first important folding armchair created during the Italian Gothic Renaissance period.
- Sawbuck chair, officially the CH29 chair, by Hans Wegner for Carl Hansen & Søn (1952).
- Sedan chair, an open or enclosed chair attached to twin poles for carrying; using this form of transport, an occupant can be carried by two or more porters
- Sgabello, from the Italian Renaissance and made of walnut, consisting of a thin seat back and an octagonal seat; sometimes considered a stool and was often placed in hallways
- Shaker rocker, one of several forms of rocking chair, including side chairs, made by Shakers
- Shaker tilting chair, allowed a person to lean back with the chair without slipping or scraping the floor
- Shower chair, a chair which is not damaged by water, sometimes on wheels, and used as a disability aid in a shower, similar to a wheelchair but has no foot pads; is waterproof and dries quickly
- Side chair, a chair with a seat and back but without armrests; often matched with a dining table or used as an occasional chair
- Sit-stand chair, normally used with a height-adjustable desk, allows the person to lean against this device and be partially supported
- Sling chair, a suspended, free-swinging chair hanging from a ceiling
- Slumber chair, an easy chair manufactured by C. F. Streit Mfg. Co. in the first half of the 20th century; has a combination upholstered back and seat portion, the inclination of which is adjustable within a base frame; later versions of this chair had a footstool with a removable top that could reveal a "slipper-compartment"
- Spinning chair, commonly used with computers due to its ability to move freely
- Spun chair, rotating chair designed by Thomas Heatherwick
- Stacking chair, designed to stack compactly on top of each other to minimize storage space required
- Stedelijk aluminium chair, designed by Sabine Marcelis for the Stedelijk museum
- Steno chair, a simple office chair, usually without arms, meant for use by secretarial (or a stenographer) staff
- Step chair, a chair which doubles as a small set of steps when folded out.
- Superleggera chair by Gio Ponti (1955)
- Stool
- Swan chair, designed by Arne Jacobsen in 1958 for the SAS Royal Hotel in Copenhagen.
- Sweetheart chair, as used in soda shops, also known as a "parlor chair" and an "ice cream chair" (from use in ice cream parlors); the wire frame in the center of the back curls in a manner to suggest a heart design but the term "sweetheart chair" also has a more generic usage and refers to any chair with a heart-shaped design in the center of the back
- Swivel chairs, swivel about a vertical axis; commonly used in offices, often on casters
- Synthesis 45 office chair designed by Ettore Sottsass for Olivetti.

== T ==
- Tantra Chair, for practicing the Kama Sutra
- Tête-à-tête chair, also known as a courting bench, a type of settee consisting of two connected chairs which allow two people to sit facing one another
- Thinking Man's Chair, designed by Jasper Morrison for Cappellini
- Throne, a ceremonial chair for a monarch or similar dignitary of high rank
- Toilet chair, a disability aid attached to a normal toilet
- Tongue chair, designed by Arne Jacobsen in 1955
- Transat chair, designed by Eileen Gray
- Tramp chair, chair for restraining a person
- Tripolina, a folding chair invented by Joseph B. Fenby
- Tripp Trapp adjustable high-chair by Peter Opsvik
- Tuffet, a low seat often used as a footrest, similar to an ottoman but shorter and with no legs
- Tugendhat chair, designed by Ludwig Mies van der Rohe and Lilly Reich in 1929–1930
- Tulip chair, designed by Eero Saarinen in 1956 and considered a classic of industrial design
- Turned chair (or thrown chair or spindle chair), made of turned wood spindles by turners (with the use of a lathe), rather than by joiners or carpenters
- two-slat post-and-rung shaving chair, made from green wood, rived and shaved with a drawknife rather than turned, made by Jennie Alexander

== U ==
- Ultraleggera 1660, very light carbon fibre chair by Oskar Zieta (homage to Gio Ponti’s Superleggera chair)

== V ==
- Vertebra Chair designed by Emilio Ambasz and Giancarlo Piretti in 1975

== W ==
- Wainscot Chair, an unupholstered oak chair popular in 17th-century colonial America
- Watchman's chair, an unupholstered wooden chair with a forward slanted seat to prevent a watchman from falling asleep
- Wassily Chair, a tubular-steel chair designed by Marcel Breuer
- Weissenhof chair, designed by Ludwig Mies van der Rohe in 1927
- Wheelchair, a chair on wheels for someone who cannot walk or has difficulty walking
- Wicker chair, made of wicker and is thus ventilated and useful under hot or humid conditions; likewise, a cane chair
- Wiggle chair, cardboard seating form designed by Frank Gehry in 1972
- Wilkerson dental chair, designed by Basil Manly Wilkerson and patented in 1877
- Windsor chair, a classic, informal chair usually constructed of wood turnings that form a high-spoked back, often topped by a shaped crest rail, outward-sloped legs, and stretchers that reinforce the legs. The seat is often saddled or sculpted for extra comfort, and some Windsors have shaped arms supported by short spindles.

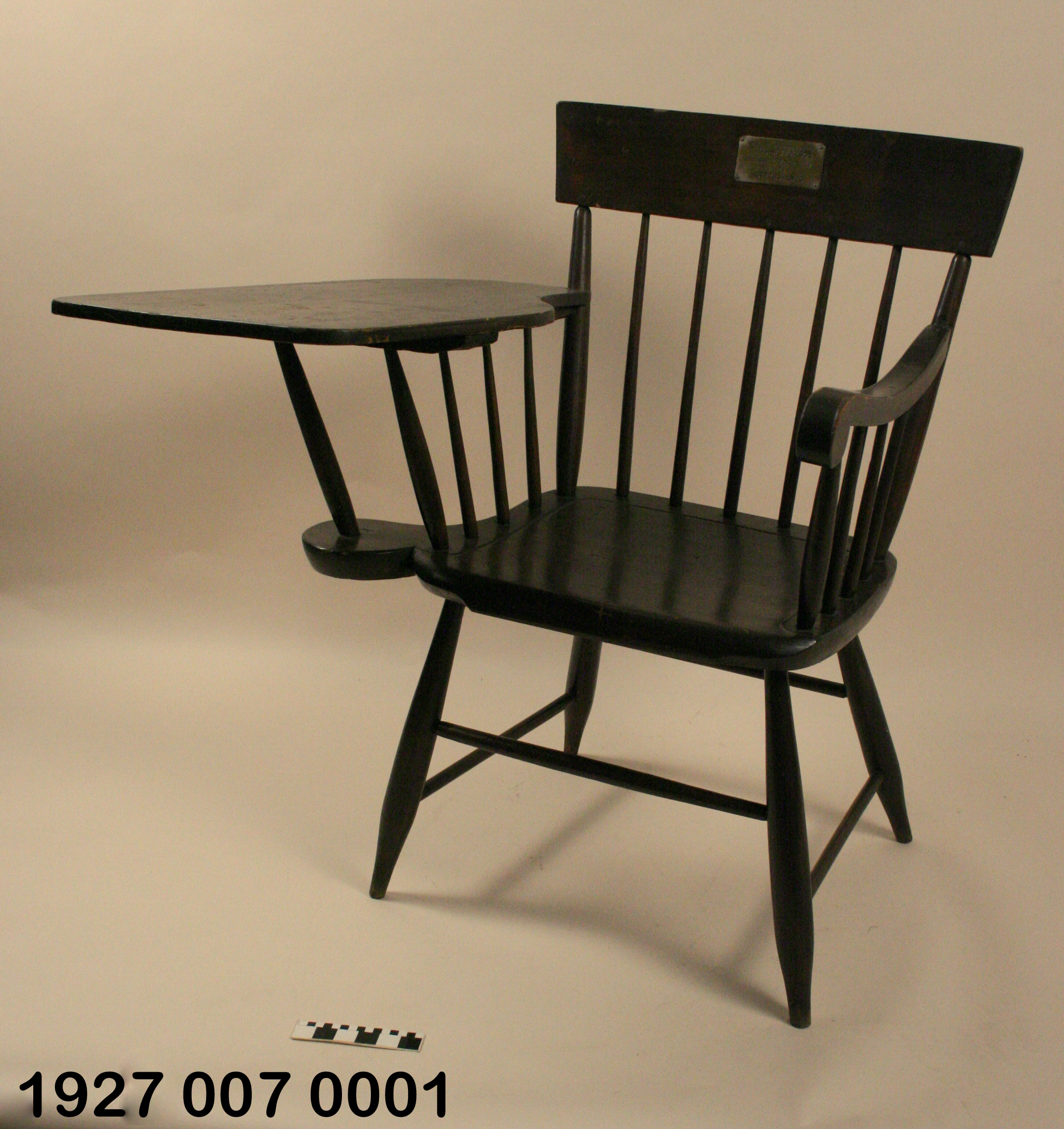
Windsor Style Desk-Chair from Monticello

- Wing chair, an upholstered easy chair with large "wings" mounted to the armrests and enclosing the head or torso areas of the body; originally designed to provide comfortable protection from drafts; a variation is the Queen Anne wing chair.
- Wishbone chair, a chair with a wishbone-shaped backrest and a woven paper seat by Hans Wegner for Carl Hansen & Søn (1949).

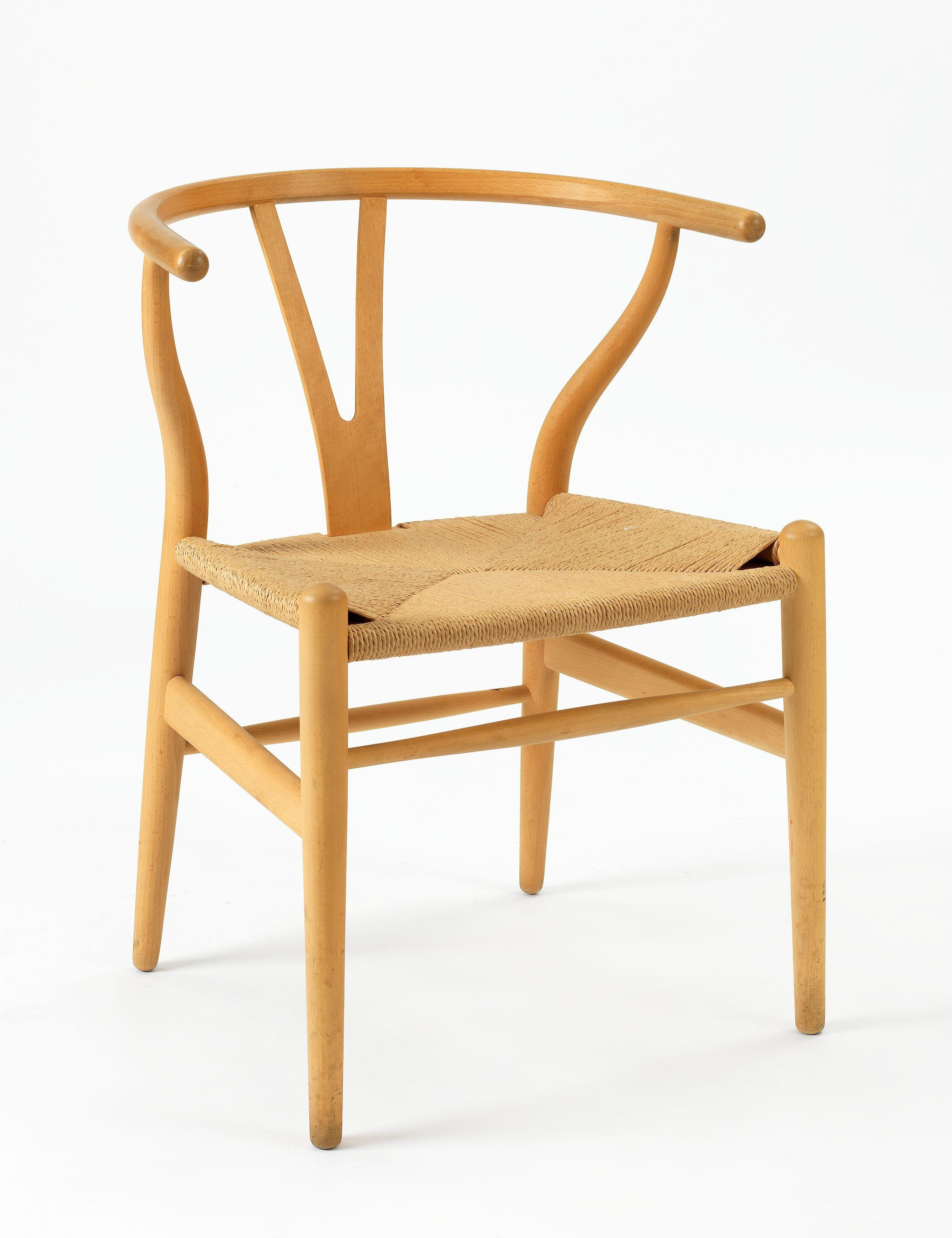
Wishbone Chair by Hans Wegner

- Womb chair designed by Eero Saarinen for Knoll
- Writing armchair, the most compact rendition of a school desk

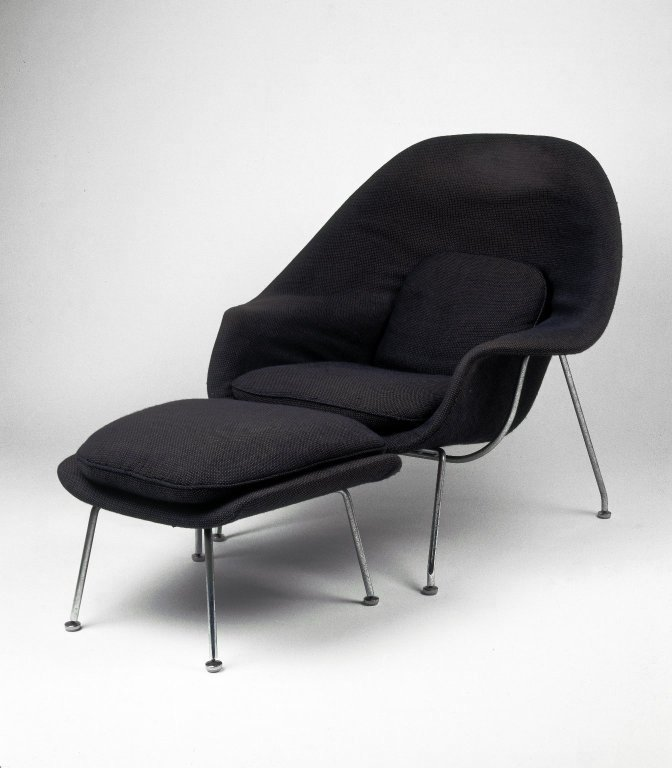
Womb Chair by Eero Saarinen

== X ==
- X-chair, a chair with an X-shaped frame

== Z ==
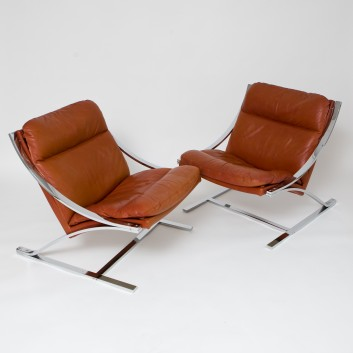
Z chair by Paul Tuttle

- "Z" Chair (originally known as the "Rocket Launcher") by Paul Tuttle
- Zaisu, a Japanese legless chair
- Zakopane Style chairs
- Zig-Zag Chair, designed by Gerrit Rietveld
- Zocker , a 1970s children's chair by Luigi Colani
