= History of the chair =

The history of the chair dates to antiquity, with surviving evidence from Ancient Egypt and Mesopotamia; chairs were also used in Ancient Greece, Rome, and among the Aztecs. In China, depictions of chairs survive from the 6th century AD, although they did not become widespread until the 12th. In medieval Europe, chairs were often associated with rulers, clergy, and other figures of authority; during the Renaissance, they became more widely used and increasingly reflected contemporary fashions and furnishings.

European chair design developed numerous regional and period styles, particularly in France and England during the 17th and 18th centuries. Among the Asante people of Ghana, chairs and stools were associated with rank and ceremonial use. The 19th century brought new stylistic movements and innovations such as Michael Thonet's bentwood No. 14 chair, while the 20th century saw increasing use of technology in chair construction and of materials such as metal, plywood, and molded plastic, as well as the development of ergonomic designs.

== Ancient Egyptian chairs ==
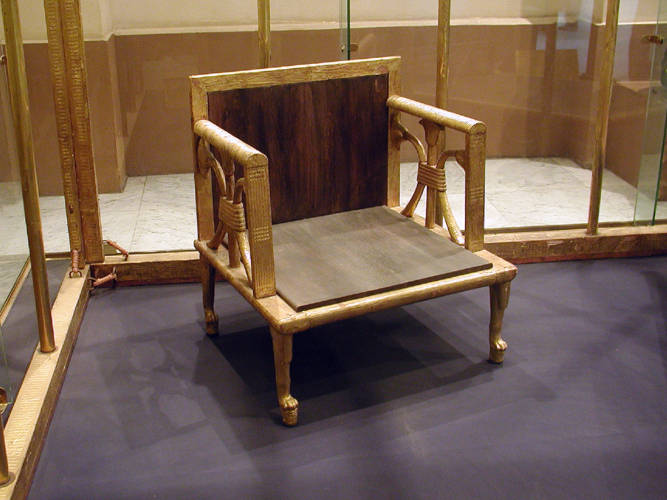
The chair of Hetepheres I, the mother of Khufu

Several depictions of chairs of various types have survived, from stools, benches, chairs, and thrones, both in the form of art and from extant examples preserved thanks to the dry environment of the tombs. These ancient chairs were built to stand much lower than modern examples, sometimes only 10 inches (25 cm) at the seat.

Archeologists have found evidence of their use as early as the 2nd Dynasty of Egypt of the Early Dynastic Period. An example of a 2nd Dynasty depiction of a chair, or perhaps more aptly a throne, is shown in the statuette of Pharaoh Nynetjer (c.2785–2742 BC) in the Rijksmuseum van Oudheden.

== Ancient Mesopotamian chairs ==
In ancient Iraq, the earliest monuments of Nineveh represent a chair without a back but with tastefully carved legs ending in lions' claws or bulls' hoofs. Others are supported by figures in the nature of caryatides or by animals.

== Greco-Roman chairs ==
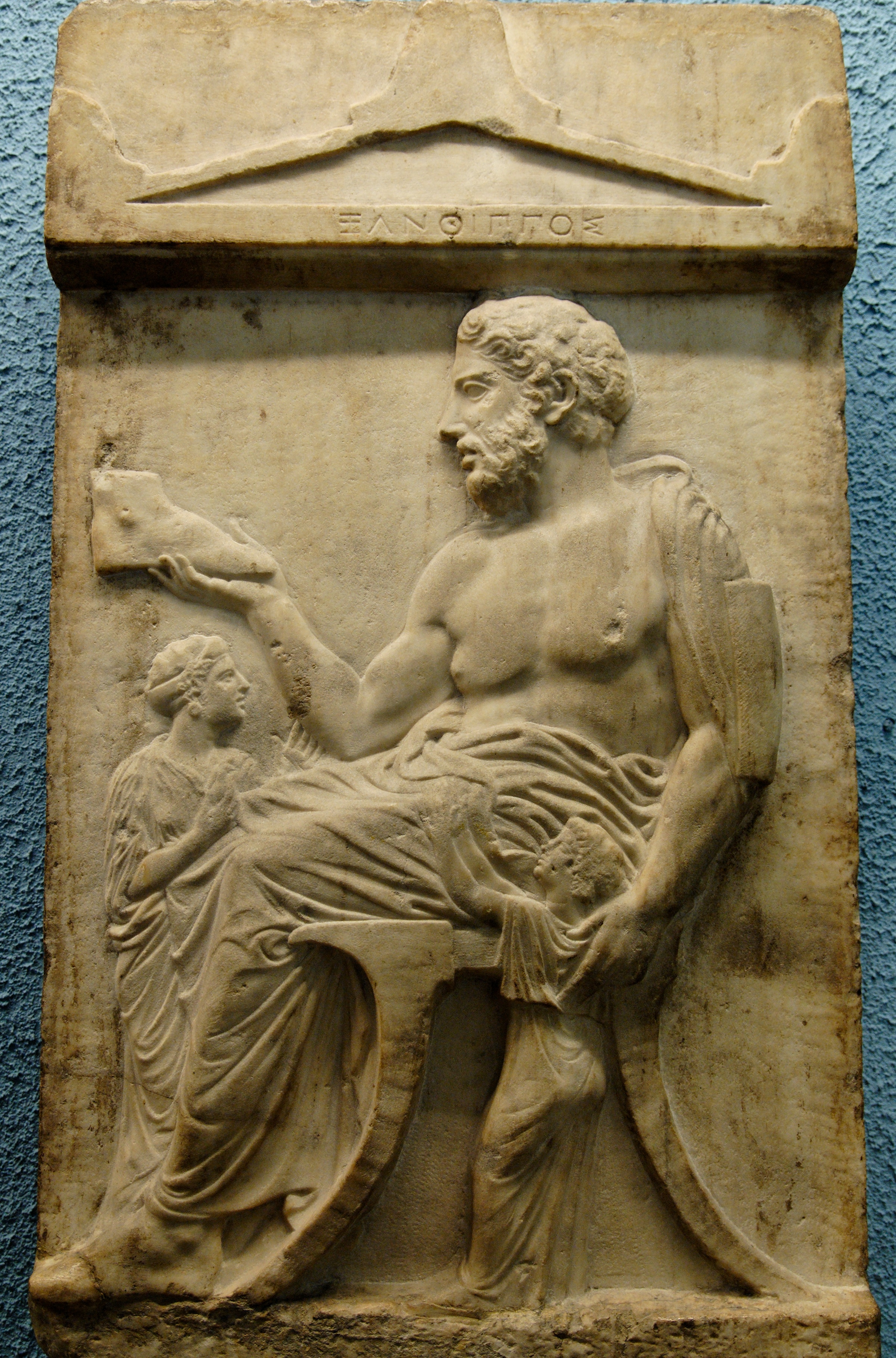
Klismos chair, with curved backrest and tapering, outcurved legs, on the stele of Xanthippos, Athens, c. 430–20 BCE

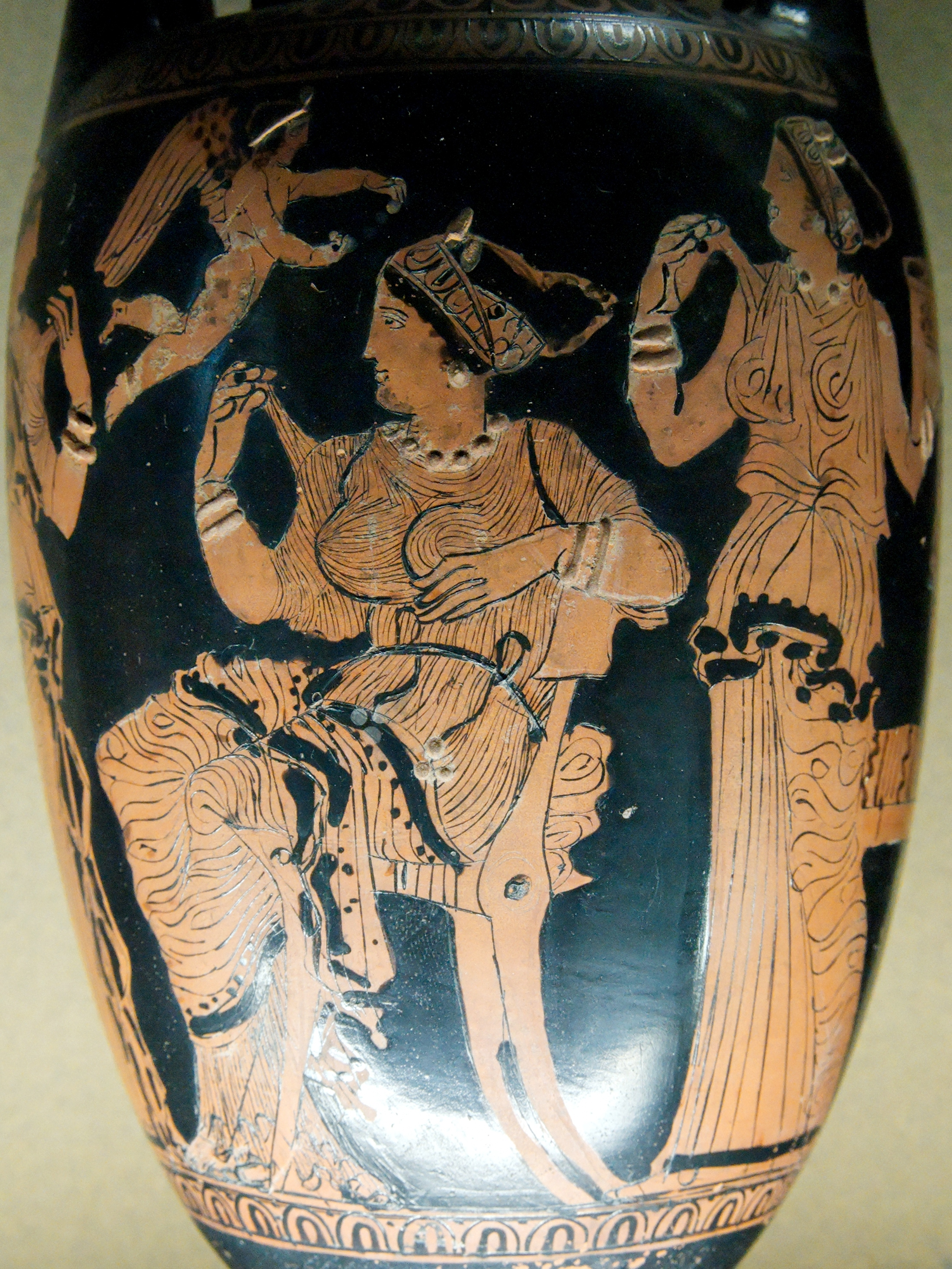
Depiction of a chair on an Attic red-figured loutrophoros

The earliest known form of Greek chair dates back to six or seven centuries BCE. On the frieze of the Parthenon, Zeus occupies a square seat with a bar-back and thick turned legs; it is ornamented with winged sphinxes and the feet of beasts. The characteristic Roman chairs were of marble, also adorned with sphinxes. The curule chair was originally very similar in form to the modern folding chair, but eventually received a good deal of ornament.

The most famous of the very few chairs which have come down from a remote antiquity is the reputed Chair of Saint Peter in St Peter's Basilica at Rome. The wooden portions are much decayed, but it would appear to be Byzantine work of the 6th century, and to be really an ancient sedia gestatoria. It has ivory carvings representing the labours of Hercules. A few pieces of an earlier oaken chair have been let in; the existing one, Gregorovius says, is of acacia wood. The legend that this was the curile chair of the senator Pudens is necessarily apocryphal. It is not, as is popularly supposed, enclosed in Gian Lorenzo Bernini's bronze chair, but is kept under triple lock and exhibited only once in a century. Byzantium, like Greece and Rome, affected the curule form of chair, and in addition to lions’ heads and winged figures of Victory (or Nike) and dolphin-shaped arms used also the lyre-back which has been made familiar by the pseudo-classical revival of the end of the 18th century.

== Mexican chairs ==
One type of ancient Mexican chair called the icpalli is mentioned by Jacques Soustelle. The icpalli can be seen in Diego Rivera's mural of the Aztec market of Tlatelolco, located in the Mexican National Palace. The icpalli is also featured in the Codex Telleriano-Remensis; dignitaries and emperors are depicted sitting in them.

== Medieval chairs ==
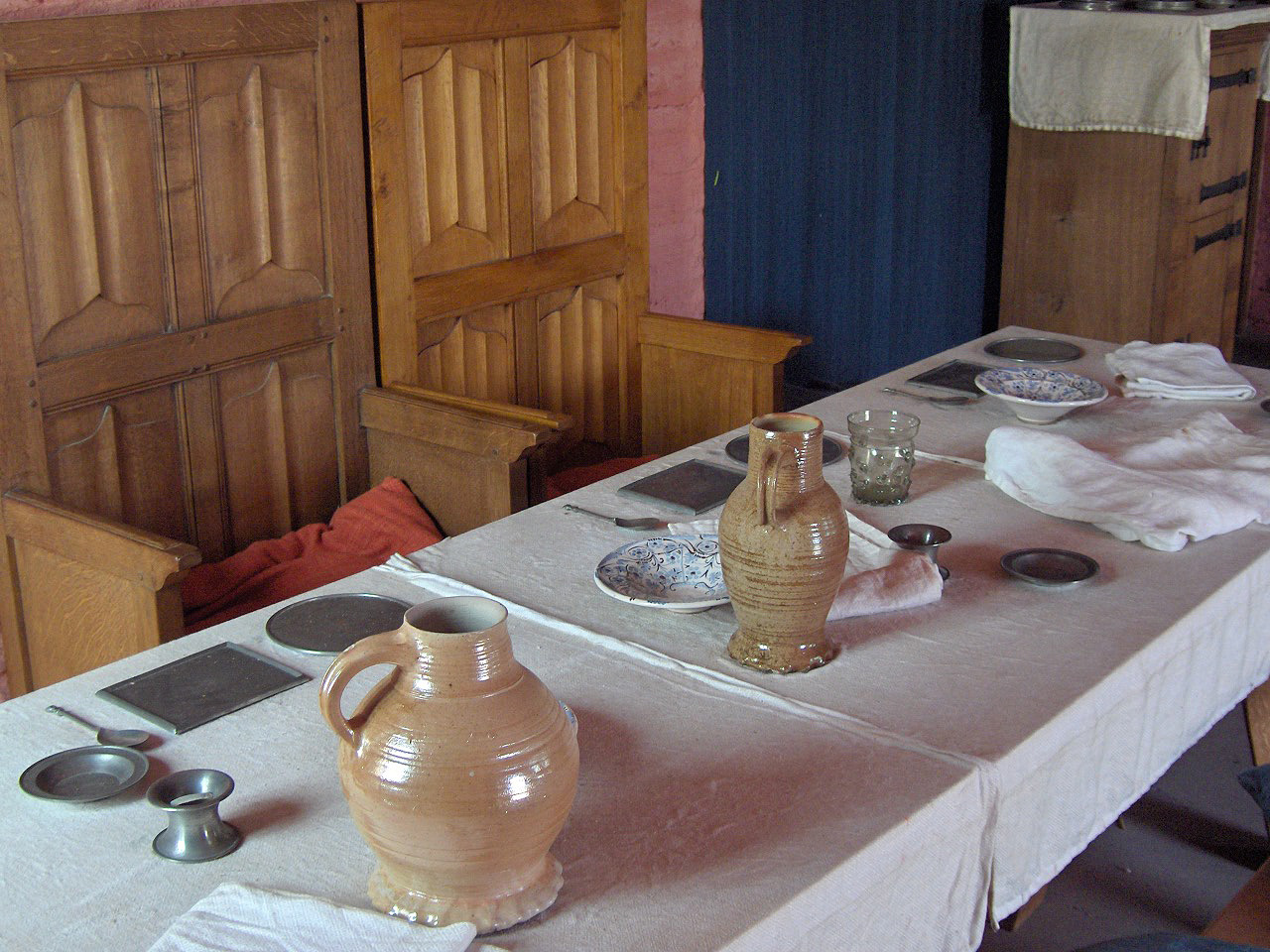
Seigneurial chairs at a table with tin cutlery, pottery, medieval glass and earthenware in majolica, c. 1465

The chair of Maximian in the cathedral of Ravenna is believed to date from the middle of the 6th century. It is of marble, round, with a high back, and is carved in high relief with figures of saints and scenes from the Gospels—the Annunciation, the Adoration of the Magi, the flight into Egypt and the baptism of Christ. The smaller spaces are filled with carvings of animals, birds, flowers and foliated ornament. The Chair of St. Augustine, dating from at least the early thirteenth century is one of the oldest cathedrae is not in use.

Another very ancient seat is the so-called "Chair of Dagobert" in the Cabinet des médailles of the Bibliothèque nationale de France. It is of cast bronze, sharpened with the chisel and partially gilt; it is of the curule or faldstool type and supported upon legs terminating in the heads and feet of animals. The seat, which was probably of leather, has disappeared. Its attribution depends entirely upon the statement of Suger, abbot of St Denis in the 12th century, who added a back and arms. Its age has been much discussed, but Viollet-le-Duc dated it to early Merovingian times, and it may in any case be taken as the oldest faldstool in existence.

To the same generic type belongs the famous abbots’ chair of Glastonbury; such chairs might readily be taken to pieces when their owners travelled. The faldisterium in time acquired arms and a back, while retaining its folding shape. The most famous, as well as the most, ancient, English chair is that made at the end of the 13th century for Edward I, in which most subsequent monarchs have been crowned. It is of an architectural type and of oak, and was covered with gilded gesso which long since disappeared.

Passing from these historic examples we find the chair monopolized by the ruler, lay or ecclesiastical, to a comparatively late date. As the seat of authority it stood at the head of the lord's table, on his dais, by the side of his bed. The seigneurial chair, more common in France and the Netherlands than in England, is a very interesting type, approximating in many respects to the episcopal or abbatial throne or stall. It early acquired a very high back and sometimes had a canopy. Arms were invariable, and the lower part was closed in with panelled or carved front and sides—the seat, indeed, was often hinged and sometimes closed with a key.

That we are still said to sit "in" an arm-chair and "on" other kinds of chairs is a reminiscence of the time when the lord or seigneur sat "in his chair." These throne-like seats were always architectural in character, and as Gothic feeling waned took the distinctive characteristics of Renaissance work. The furniture makers also covered their crude work with gold which is called gilding.

== Chinese chairs ==
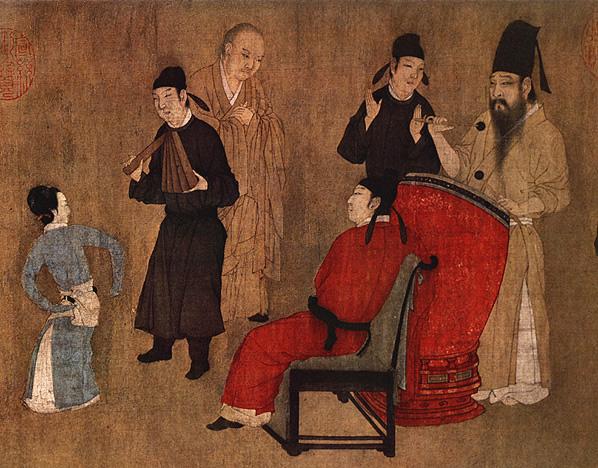
A Chinese gentleman sitting in a chair while listening to music and watching a dancer, close-up detail in a 12th-century Song dynasty remake of the 10th-century original Night Revels of Han Xizai

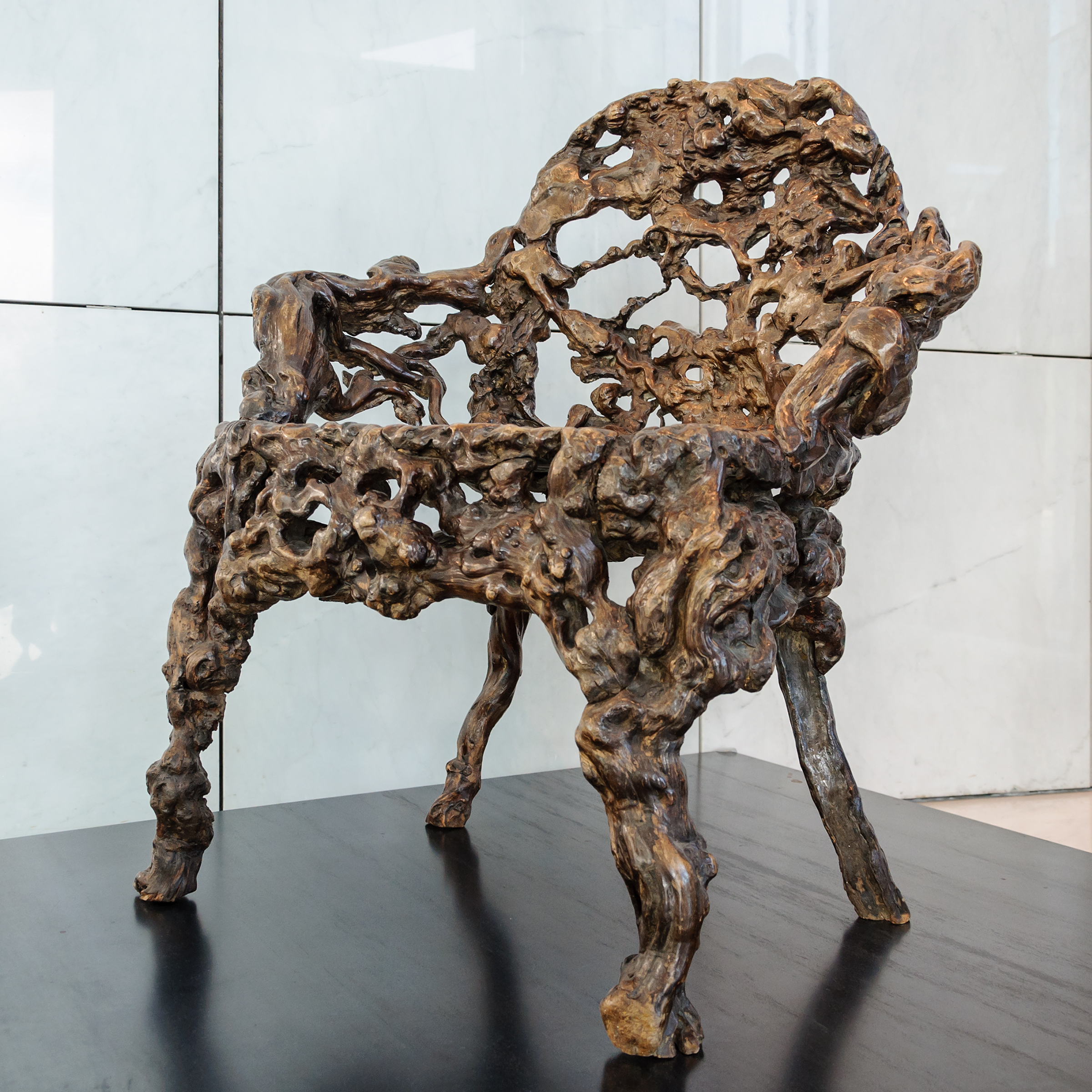
Chinese armchair made from roots. Qing dynasty, Qianlong reign, 18th century (Asian Art Museum, Nice)

Before the Tang dynasty (618–907 AD), the predominant sitting positions in the Han Chinese culture, as well as several of its neighbors, were the seiza and lotus position on the floor or sitting mats. The earliest images of chairs in China are from sixth-century Buddhist murals and stele, but the practice of sitting in chairs at that time was rare. It was not until the twelfth century that chairs became widespread in China. Scholars disagree on the reasons for the adoption of the chair. The most common theories are that the chair was an outgrowth of indigenous Chinese furniture, that it evolved from a camp stool imported from Central Asia, that it was introduced to China by Nestorian missionaries in the seventh century, and that the chair came to China from India as a form of Buddhist monastic furniture. In China today, both elevated living and mat level forms are still in use.

== Renaissance chairs ==
In Europe, it was owing in great measure to the Renaissance that the chair ceased to be a mark of high office, and became the customary companion of whoever could afford to buy it. Once the idea of privilege faded the chair speedily came into general use. We find almost at once began to reflect the fashions of the hour. No piece of furniture has ever been so close an index to sumptuary changes. It has varied in size, shape and sturdiness with the fashion not only of women's dress but of men's also. Thus the chair which was not, even with its arms purposely suppressed, too ample during the several reigns of some form or other of hoops and farthingale, became monstrous when these protuberances disappeared. Again, the costly laced coats of the dandy of the 18th and early 19th centuries were so threatened by the ordinary form of seat that a "conversation chair" was devised, which enabled the buck and the ruffler to sit with his face to the back, his valuable tails hanging unimpeded over the front. The early chair almost invariably had arms, and it was not until towards the close of the 16th century that the smaller form grew common.

The majority of the chairs of all countries until the middle of the 17th century were of timber (the commonest survival is oak) without upholstery, and when it became customary to cushion them, leather was sometimes employed; subsequently velvet and silk were extensively used, and at a later period cheaper and often more durable materials. In Abraham Bosse's engraving (illustration, left), a stylish Parisian musical party of about 1630 have pulled their low chairs (called "backstools" in contemporary England) away from the tapestry-hung walls where they were normally lined up. The padded back panels were covered with needlework panels to suit the tapestries, or in other settings with leather, plain or tooled. Plain cloth across the back hid the wooden framing. Stools with column legs complement the set, but aren't en suite. In seventeenth century France the bergère chair became fashionable among the nobility and was often made of walnut.

Leather was not infrequently used even for the costly and elaborate chairs of the faldstool form—occasionally sheathed in thin plates of silver—which Venice sent all over Europe. To this day, indeed, leather is one of the most frequently employed materials for chair covering. The outstanding characteristic of most chairs until the middle of the 17th century was massiveness and solidity. Being usually made of oak, they were of considerable weight, and it was not until the introduction of the handsome Louis XIII chairs with cane backs and seats that either weight or solidity was reduced.

== English chairs ==
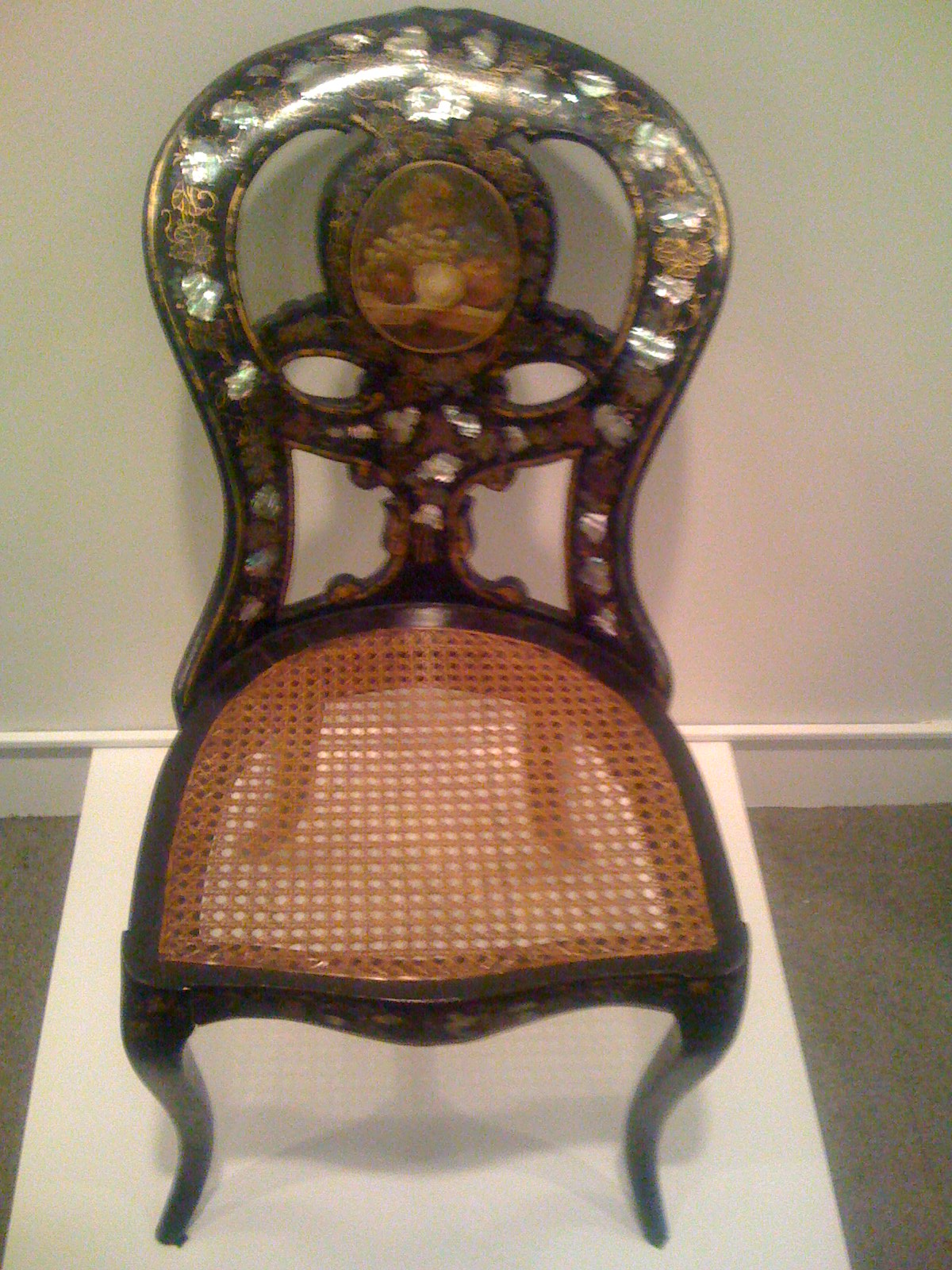
The English side chair (c. 1850) of unknown maker. The chair is made of papier-mâché with inlaid mother of pearl, gilded and painted decoration. Part of the Baltimore Museum of Art collection.

Although English furniture derives so extensively from foreign and especially French and Italian models, the earlier forms of English chairs owed but little to exotic influences. This was especially the case down to the end of the Tudor period, after which France began to set her mark upon the British chair. The squat variety, with heavy and sombre back, carved like a piece of panelling, gave place to a taller, more slender, and more elegant form, in which the framework only was carved, and attempts were made at ornament in new directions. The stretcher especially offered opportunities which were not lost upon the cabinet-makers of the Restoration. From a mere uncompromising cross-bar intended to strengthen the construction it blossomed, almost suddenly, into an elaborate scroll-work or an exceedingly graceful semicircular ornament connecting all four legs, with a vase-shaped knob in the centre. The arms and legs of chairs of this period were scrolled, the splats of the back often showing a rich arrangement of spirals and scrolls. This most decorative of all types appears to have been popularized in England by the cavaliers who had been in exile with Charles II, and had become familiar with it in the north-western parts of the European continent. During the reign of William III and Mary II these charming forms degenerated into something much stiffer and more rectangular, with a solid, more or less fiddle-shaped splat and a cabriole leg with pad feet. The more ornamental examples had cane seats and ill-proportioned cane backs. From these forms was gradually developed the Chippendale chair, with its elaborately interlaced back, its graceful arms and square or cabriole legs, the latter terminating in the claw and ball or the pad foot. George Hepplewhite, Thomas Sheraton and Robert Adam all aimed at lightening the chair, which, even in the master hands of Thomas Chippendale, remained comparatively heavy. The endeavour succeeded, and the modern chair is everywhere comparatively slight.

== Sub-Saharan African chairs ==
While Ibn Battuta was visiting Mali in 1352, he mentioned the king's interpreter sitting on a chair and beating on an instrument made of reeds. The Portuguese explorer Vasco da Gama (the first European to visit Malindi) discussed being greeted by a king seated on a bronze chair and wearing an ornate robe trimmed in green satin.

=== Ghana ===
Stools are of great importance for the Akan people of Ghana, both as a status symbol, as a practical object for seating and as an object of great spiritual significance. The Asante chair designs like Asipim, Hwedo, and akonkromfi (also called nnamu) may have been based on European prototypes from the mid-17th century, although others, including scholars like Alex A. Y. Kyerematen, state that these chairs are uniquely Asante creations reflecting local craftsmanship and cultural identity.

Sacred stools in Asante culture coincide with the founding of the Asante Kingdom in the 17th century, when, as the legend goes, the first sacred stool descended from on high and landed on the lap of the first Asante king, Osei Tutu I.

However, on the subject of the foreign origin of Ghanaian chairs, Alex A. Y. Kyerematen says:

It has been contended that the designs of the hwedom and the akonkromfi look foreign and may be copies of European designs introduced by early Portuguese and Dutch traders. If this view is established, however, it makes nonsense of the history given to me of the evolution of the asipim chair.

— Panoply of Ghana, p.28

The asipim is the most common type of chairs; minor chiefs may have at least one, whereas wealthier chiefs may have several. Locally-made chairs are a royal prerogative, mainly used for stately matter. Osei Tutu made for himself the Hwedom chair. The Golden Stool was sat upon a chair with a longer seat so that it could be seen during public occasions called the Hwedom-Tea, or the slender Hwedom. Nowadays, chairs are preferred to ceremonial stools as seating. They are devoid of spiritual significance, probably because of their foreign origin.

Palanquins are used by the Asante, carried by four mens' heads.

== 18th-century chairs ==
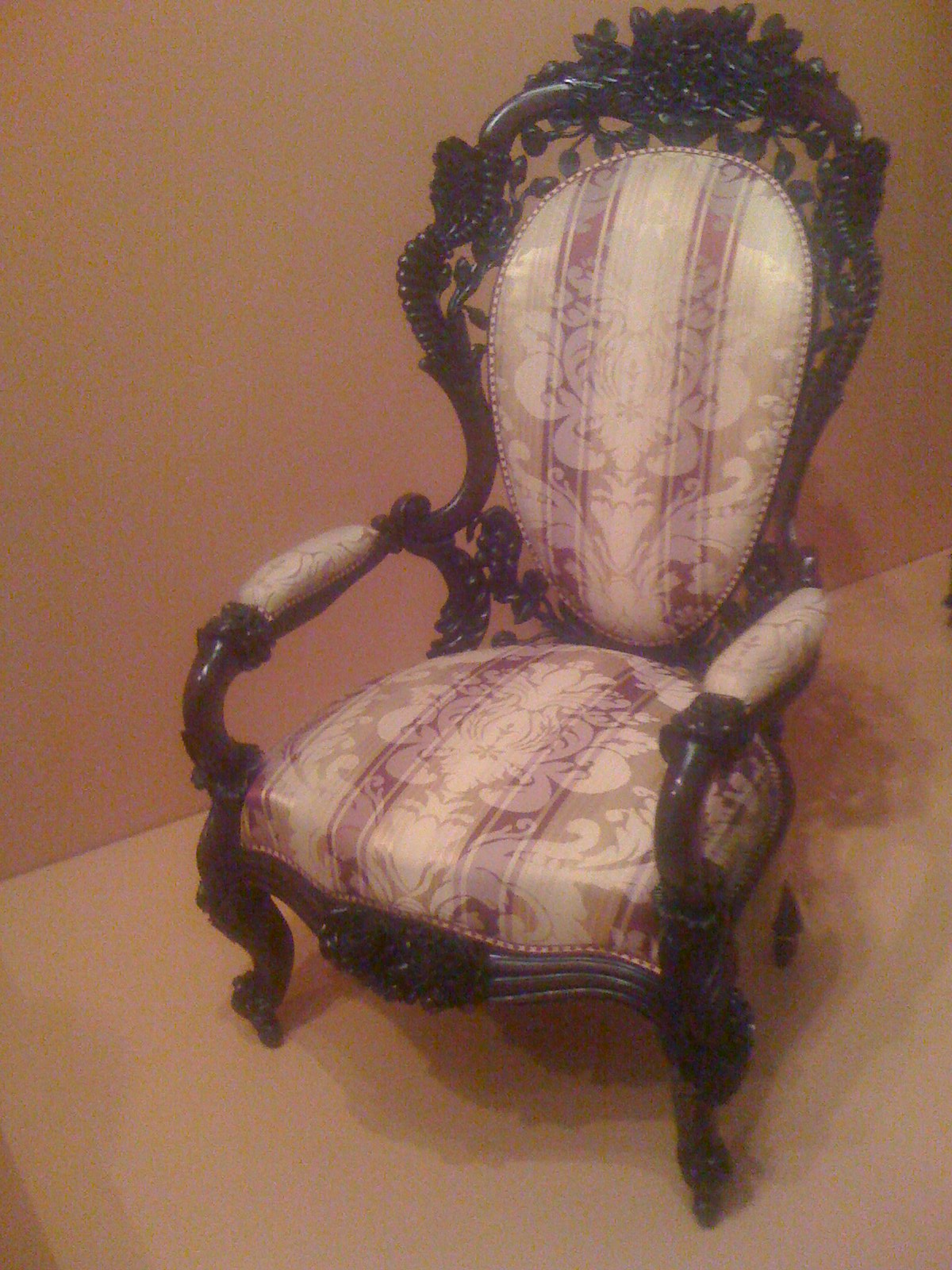
American Armchair (1850–1863) made of Rosewood, rosewood veneer, pine, and chestnut. Attributed to John Henry Belter. Part of the Baltimore Museum of Art collection.

French fashions in chairs, as with everything else, radiated from Paris. From the late 1720s, fashionable "Louis XV" French chairs were constructed without stretchers, which interfered with the unified flow of curved seatrails into cabriole legs that generally ended in scroll feet. According to strict guild regulations in force until the Revolution, French chairmaking was the business of the menuisier alone, whose craft was conjoined with that of the upholsterer (huissier), both of whom specialized in seat-furniture-making in Paris. A range of specialised seats were developed and given fanciful names, of which the comfortable bergère ("shepherdess") is the most familiar. Walnut and beech were the characteristics woods employed; finishes were painted in clear light tones en suite with wall panelling, gilded (sometimes rechampi en blanc) or left in the natural color (á la capuchine), in which case walnut was the timber used. Fruitwoods were popular for chairmaking in the provinces, where the menuisier might also be called upon to provide carved and moulded boiseries for rooms. Lyon, Bordeaux and Liège all produced characteristic variations on Paris models between c. 1725 and 1780.

In the late 1760s in Paris the first Parisian neoclassical chairs were made, even before the accession of Louis XVI, whose name is attached to the first phases of the style. Straight tapering fluted legs joined by a block at the seat rail and architectural mouldings, characterize the style, in which each element is a discrete entity. Louis Delanois, Jean-Claude Sené and Georges Jacob were three leading chairmakers in the 1770s and 80s.

Though some stories attribute its invention to Benjamin Franklin, historians trace the rocking chair's origins to North America during the early 18th century. It arrived in England shortly after its development, although work continued in America. The production of wicker rocking chairs reached its peak in America during the middle of the 18th century.

== 19th-century chairs ==
The Art Nouveau school produced chairs of simplicity. The Arts and Crafts movement produced heavy, straight lined, minimally ornamented chairs. One of the most famous of those chairs is the Michael Thonet bentwood No. 14 chair (bistro chair), created in 1859. It has revolutionized the industry and is still being produced today.

== 20th-century and modern chairs ==
The 20th century saw an increasing use of technology in chair construction with such things as all-metal folding chairs, metal-legged chairs, the Slumber Chair, moulded plastic chairs and ergonomic chairs, recliner chairs (easy chair), butterfly chair, beanbag chairs, the egg or pod chair, plywood and laminate wood chairs, and massage chairs. Architects such as Frank Lloyd Wright and Eero Saarinen also designed chairs to match the design of their buildings.

== See also ==
- A Taxonomy of Office Chairs – Non-fiction work by Jonathan Olivares
- Bergère – Type of French armchair
- Watchman's chair – Chair with forward slanted seat
- Windsor chair – Type of chair with a solid wood seat and turned legs
- Modern furniture – Furniture designed from the 19th century to the present day
- List of chairs
