= Convertible (disambiguation) =

A convertible is a class of automobiles with an optional open roof top

Convertible may also refer to:

- Convertible (computer), a class of computers between tablet PCs and notebooks
- Convertible currency, a currency reference
- Convertible security, a stock trading reference
- IBM PC Convertible, IBM's first laptop computer in 1986
- Convertibles (album), an album by Chuck Inglish

== See also ==
- Cabriolet, a French term for convertible
- Cabriolet (carriage), a light two-wheeled horse-drawn vehicle
- Cabriolet (furniture), an armchair
- Netvertible, a class of computers between tablets and netbooks
