= Chaise Longue (Le Corbusier) =

Chair designed by Le Corbusier, Pierre Jeanneret, and Charlotte Perriand

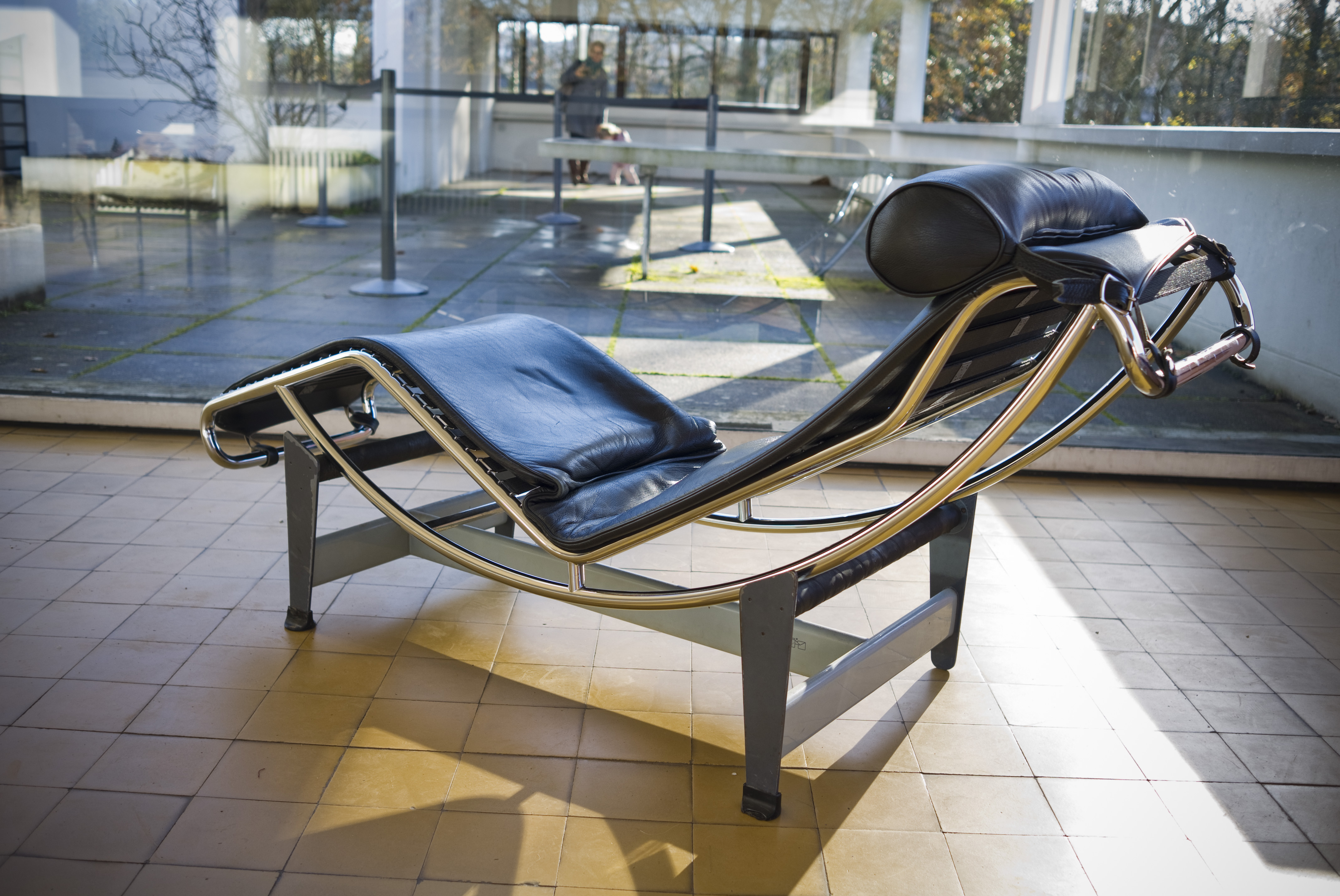
- Designer: Charlotte Perriand
- Date: 1928–1930
- Style / tradition: Modernist
- Sold by: Cassina S.p.A.

Chaise longue à réglage continu, also Chaise longue modèle B 306 à réglage continu or Chaise longue B 306 (later Chaise Longue - LC4, in 1964), is a chaise longue designed by the French designer Charlotte Perriand, who worked in the atelier of the Swiss-French architect Le Corbusier and his partner Pierre Jeanneret. Le Corbusier and Pierre Jeanneret participated in the design process.

== See also ==
- Grand Confort
- Le Corbusier's Furniture
