= Le Corbusier's Furniture =

Furniture line created by Le Corbusier

- Designer: Le Corbusier, Charlotte Perriand and Pierre Jeanneret
- Date: 1928–1930
- Materials: Chrome on steel frame. Leather cushions
- Style / tradition: Modernist
- Sold by: Cassina S.p.A.

Le Corbusier's Furniture is a classic furniture line created by Le Corbusier. The line was introduced in 1928 at the Salon d‘Autumne in Paris.

== History ==
Le Corbusier began experimenting with furniture design in 1928 after seeing a model apartment designed by the architect Charlotte Perriand and inviting her to join his studio. His cousin, Pierre Jeanneret, also collaborated on many of the designs. Before the arrival of Perriand, Le Corbusier relied on ready-made furniture to furnish his projects, such as the simple pieces manufactured by Thonet. This company manufactured his designs in the 1930s.

== Conceptualization ==
In 1928, Le Corbusier and Perriand began to put the expectations for furniture that Le Corbusier outlined in his 1925 book L'Art Décoratif d'aujourd'hui into practice. In the book, he defined three different furniture types: type-needs, type-furniture, and human-limb objects.

He defined human-limb objects as: "Extensions of our limbs and adapted to human functions that are type-needs and type-functions, therefore type-objects and type-furniture. The human-limb object is a docile servant. A good servant is discreet and self-effacing to leave his master free. Certainly, works of art are tools, beautiful tools. And long live the good taste manifested by choice, subtlety, proportion, and harmony".

== Products ==
The first results of the collaboration were three chrome-plated tubular steel chairs designed for two of his projects: The Maison la Roche in Paris and a pavilion for Barbara and Henry Church. The line of furniture was expanded for Le Corbusier's 1929 Salon d'Automne installation, 'Equipment for the Home'.

These chairs included the LC-1, LC-2, LC-3, and LC-4, originally titled "Basculant" (LC-1), "Fauteuil grand confort, petit modèle" (LC-2, "great comfort sofa, small model"), "Fauteuil grand confort, grand modèle" (LC-3, "great comfort sofa, large model"), and "Chaise longue" (LC-4, "Long chair"). The LC-2 and LC-3 are more colloquially referred to as the petit confort and grand confort (abbreviation of full title, and due to respective sizes). The LC-2 was featured in the Maxell "blown away" advertisement.

== List of Furniture items ==
- LC1 - Sling Chair, originally titled Basculant
- LC2 - Grand confort, petit modèle referred as Cushion Baskets (1928)
- LC3 - Grand confort, grand modèle referred as Cushion Baskets (1928)
- LC4 - Chaise longue "Long chair"
- LC5 - Sofa Bed
- LC5.F - Canapé
- LC6 - Table
- LC7 - The Swivel Chair (1928)
- LC8 - Swivel Stool
- LC9 - Bathroom Stool
- LC10 P - Rectangular Low Table
- LC11 P - Table
- LC12 - Table designed in 1925 for Villa La Roche
- LC13 - Fauteuil Wagon Fumoir
- LC14 - Tabouret (1952 - 1959) (Tabouret LC14.01, Tabouret LC14.02)
- LC15 - Table De Conférence
- LC16 - Table De Travail Avec Rayonnages
- LC17 - Portemantea (1957)
- LC19 - Table Esprit Nouveau

=== Wooden ===
- Authentic wood design
