= Wingback =

The word wingback has several senses:

- Wing chair, a type of high-backed chair
- Wingback (American football), is one of several varieties of running backs in the wing T formation
- Wing-back (association football), a defensive position
