= Grand Confort =

Furniture piece by Le Corbusier

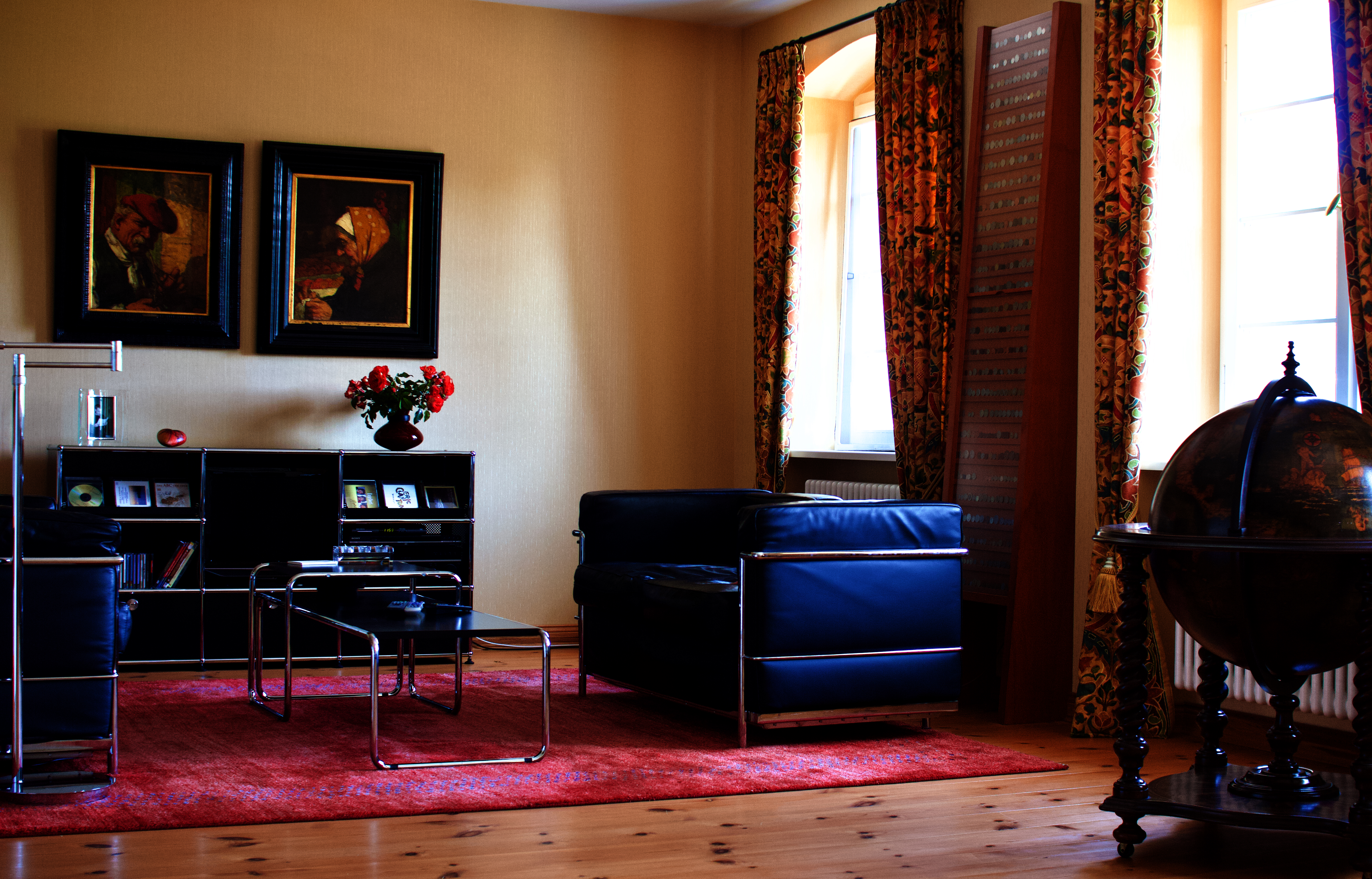
- Grand Confort LC-3 (center and, partially, on the left)
- Designer: Le Corbusier
- Date: 1928–1930
- Materials: Chrome on steel frame, leather cushions filled with PU-foam
- Style / tradition: Modernist
- Sold by: Cassina S.p.A.

Grand Confort is a cube-shaped high armchair, whose leather cushions are held in a chrome-plated steel corset. It was designed as a modernist response to the traditional club chair in 1928 by a team of three: Charlotte Perriand with Le Corbusier, and his cousin and colleague Pierre Jeanneret. The chairs were put on the market with the Le Corbusier Collection brand, but the true designer was Perrian, since Le Corbusier dismissed design of furniture as "le blah, blah, blah".

The LC-2 and LC-3 were referred as Cusion Baskets by Le Corbusier. They are more colloquially referred to as the petit confort and grand confort due to their respective sizes.

== Series ==
These chairs have become most famous:

- LC-1 – Originally titled Basculant, Fauteuil Grand Confort
- LC-2 – Petit Modèle: With a shape close to a cube, it is narrower but has a higher seat and back. It is a small model of a comfort sofa.
- LC-3 – Fauteuil grand confort, grand modèle: Wider and lower to the ground, it is a large model of comfort sofa.

== In popular culture ==
The LC-2 (and similar LC-3) have been featured in a variety of media, notably the Maxell "blown away" advertisement. At the 2010 Apple event, the then CEO Steve Jobs used a classic LC-3 chair while introducing the iPad.

They are a permanent design collection of the Museum of Modern Art, in New York.

In Sherlock, the modern-day BBC adaptation of Sherlock Holmes, Holmes sits in an LC-3, while Dr. Watson sits in a traditional club chair.

In Spy × Family, the first volume depicts the character Twilight sitting in an LC-2. The Forger family's living room is also decorated with LC-2 chairs and a sofa.

== See also ==
- Le Corbusier's Furniture
