= Bergère =

Type of French armchair

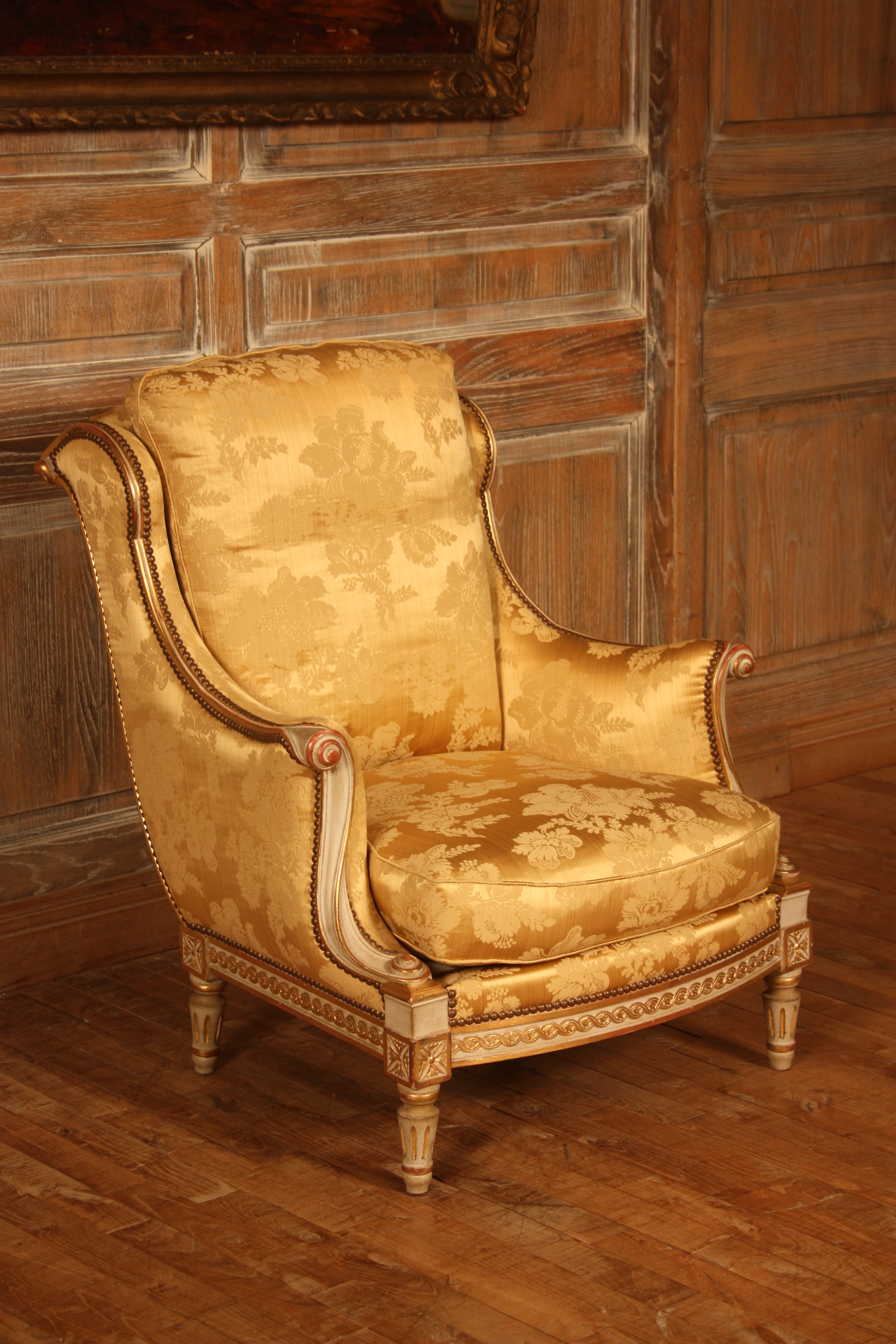
A replica bergère

A bergère (French for shepherdess) is an enclosed upholstered French armchair (fauteuil) with an upholstered back and armrests on upholstered frames. The seat frame is over-upholstered, but the rest of the wooden framing is exposed: it may be moulded or carved, and of beech, painted or gilded, or of fruitwood, walnut or mahogany with a waxed finish. Padded elbowrests may stand upon the armrests. A bergère is fitted with a loose, but tailored, seat cushion. It is designed for lounging in comfort, with a deeper, wider seat than that of a regular fauteuil, though the bergères by Bellangé in the White House are more formal. A bergère in the eighteenth century was essentially a meuble courant, designed to be moved about to suit convenience, rather than being ranged permanently formally along the walls as part of the decor.

== Origin ==
The fanciful name, "shepherdess chair", was coined in mid-eighteenth century Paris, where the model developed without a notable break from the late-seventeenth century chaise de commodité, a version of the wing chair, whose upholstered "wings" shielding the face from fireplace heat or from draughts were retained in the bergère à oreilles ("with ears"), or, fancifully, bergère confessionale, as if the occupant were hidden from view, as in a confessional.

A bergère may have a flat, raked back, in which case it is à la reine, or, more usually in Louis XV furnishings, it has a coved back, en cabriolet. A bergère with a low coved back that sweeps without a break into the armrests is a marquise. Appearing first in Paris during the Régence (1715–23), the form reaches its full development in the unifying curves of the rococo style, then continues in a more architectural rectilinear style in the Louis XVI, Directoire, and French and American Empire styles.

== History ==
=== 18th century ===
Coming from the 17th-century chaise de commodité (French for "wing chair"), the bergère evolved by taking rigid structures to emphasize comfort and informality, reflecting the Rococo aesthetics and French culture.

=== Variations ===
- Bergère à la Reine - Has a high, flat back with straight arms; meant to be formal and regal.
- Bergère en Cabriolet - More rounded, has a lower back and arms; mean to be cozy and enveloping.
- Bergère Marquise - A more wider Bergère meant for sitting two persons; purposed to be more social and fashionable.

== Characteristics ==
The bergère has fully upholstered sides, with open wooden frames that are carved or gilded. Its deep and wide seat with a loose cushion accommodates the heavy dresses of its era. Its legs are usually short and cabriole-shaped, and its materials have a rich range between silk, velvet, as well as modern leather or cotton in contemporary iterations.

== Significance ==
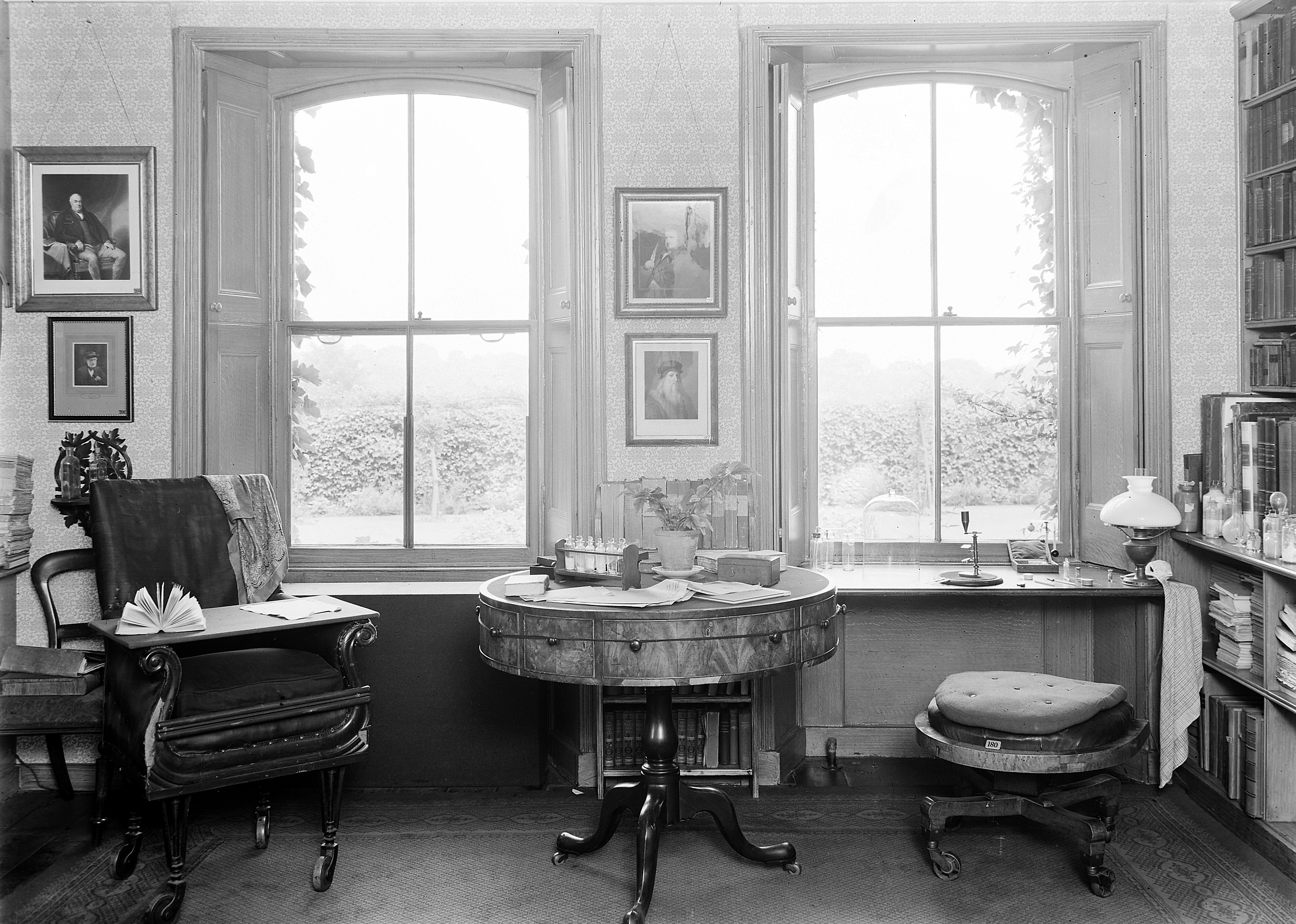
Interior view of Darwin's house showing his wheeled office armchair (left) and a wheeled ottoman (right)

In France, the bergère became a staple for noble and aristocratic salons, promoting its comfort and sociability. Its design was meant for relaxed interactions, moving away from the past formal seating and into a new era for supporting conversational spaces. It influenced English designs, blending its French elegance with the comfort of the British. Today, bergères still continue to exist in modern interior spaces, often in newer fabrics that take traditional design with contemporary aesthetics.

One of the first known wheeled office chairs was a bergère modified by Charles Darwin in order to facilitate gliding from one specimen to another in his Kent study.

== See also ==
- Cabriolet (furniture)
- List of chairs
- A Taxonomy of Office Chairs
