= Asian Art Museum (Nice) =

Museum designed by Kenzo Tange in France

Asian Art Museum, Nice
- Musée départemental des arts asiatiques de Nice
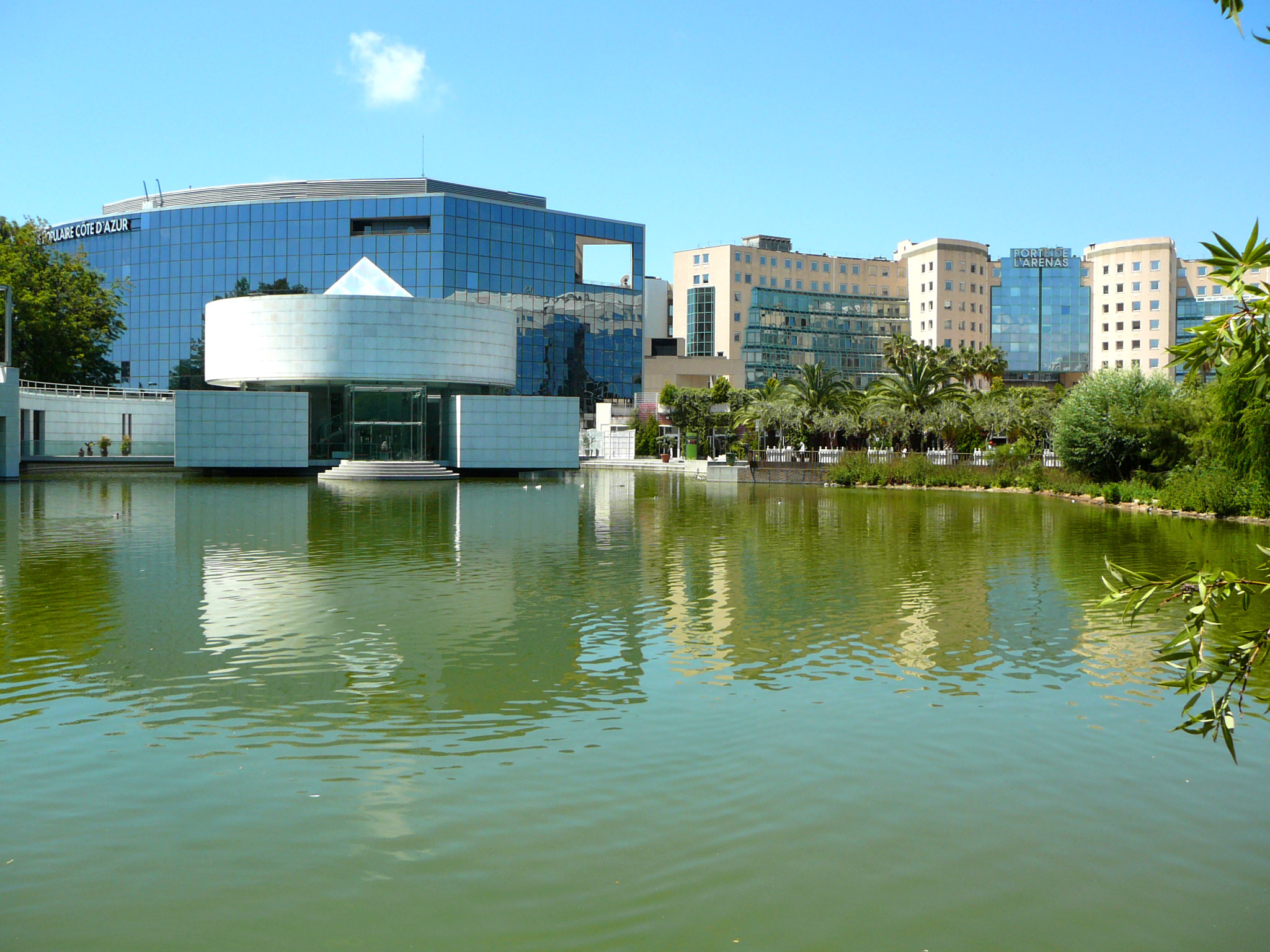
- Asian Art Museum, located just above the water on the left, near Parc Phœnix
- Established: 1998
- Location: 405 Promenade des Anglais, Nice, France
- Coordinates: 43°40′5″N 7°12′58″E
- Type: Asian art museum
- Architect: Kenzō Tange
- Website: maa.departement06.fr

The Asian Art Museum of Nice (in French: Musée départemental des arts asiatiques de Nice) is a museum located in Nice, France, dedicated to the arts and cultures of Asia. It was established in 1998 and is operated by the Alpes-Maritimes departmental council.

It located near Parc Phœnix. It was inaugurated on October 16, 1998. Following a donation that fell through, the museum built its collections ex nihilo (from scratch).

The museum was designed by the Japanese architect Kenzo Tange: "In my mind, this museum is a jewel of snow shining in the azure of the Mediterranean. It is a swan floating on a peaceful lake amidst lush vegetation ..."

Adjacent to a floral park, the building sits above an artificial lake and gives the illusion of floating on the water.

The architectural aesthetic of the museum is based on the contrast between solid forms clad in marble, giving an impression of robustness, and transparent walls that bring lightness. The setback of the walls at the water’s edge gives the structure the impression of defying the laws of gravity.

Pierre-Yves Trémois initiated the project by offering his collection of Asian art to the City of Nice in the mid-1980s in exchange for the creation of a museum. Jacques Médecin, mayor of Nice from 1966 to 1990, supported the project, which was located in the heart of the Arénas development zone, then undergoing rapid growth.

== The museum ==
=== Initiative for creation ===
The museum opened its doors in 1998 and was designed by the Japanese architect Kenzo Tange (1913–2005) near Phoenix Park in Nice.

Jacques Médecin (1928–1998), mayor of Nice from 1966 to 1990, wanted to exhibit works by Pierre-Yves Trémois and pieces of Asian art that the artist proposed to donate to the city of Nice. It was P.-Y. Trémois who reportedly encouraged political leaders to choose the famous architect Kenzo Tange rather than a local architect. Due to Jacques Médecin’s fleeing abroad and conviction for corruption, the initial project was abandoned, and the building remained unoccupied for several years.

The project was later resumed and transformed by the General Council of Alpes-Maritimes into a museum of Asian arts, with the support and backing of the French Museums Directorate and collaboration from the National Museum of Asian Arts - Guimet, the Museum of Man, the Museum of Decorative Arts, and the National Contemporary Art Fund for loans and deposits granted while the museum built its own collection.

The first curator, Marie-Pierre Foissy-Aufrère, successfully took on the challenge of creating a museum evoking the great Asian civilizations in a space that was certainly exceptional but unfortunately extremely cramped.

=== Today ===
The Asian Art Museum of Nice is a place for encounters and exchanges between Asian arts and Western culture. The museum’s collections consist of carefully selected works from Asian cultures, mixing court arts and popular or tribal expressions alongside contemporary creations.

Live art performances, demonstrations of Asian gestures, and tea ceremonies held throughout the year extend the visit beyond the collection or exhibitions.

"The museum’s design is based on two fundamental geometric shapes of Japanese tradition; the square, symbolizing earth, and the circle, symbolizing the sky..." — Kenzo Tange.

The combination of the square and circle geometric forms evokes a Tibetan mandala. The four cubes overlooking the lake are dedicated to Indian, Chinese, Japanese, and Southeast Asian civilizations. On the first floor, the cylindrical rotunda topped with a glass pyramid is dedicated to Buddhist statuary.

The museographic presentation, designed by architect François Deslaugiers, fully supports this highlighting of the exhibited objects within the museum through glass supports and refined lighting.

== The museum’s collections ==
The museum’s collection is founded on a selection of emblematic works representing the spirit of Asian cultures, combining court arts, religious creations, everyday objects, and popular expressions. The museum’s collections reconcile genres traditionally divided among history, ethnography, and decorative arts museums, while also paying attention to certain contemporary creations. There is a collection dedicated to China, Japan, India, Southeast Asia, and Buddhism.

== Origin of the museum’s pieces ==
=== Buffalo ===
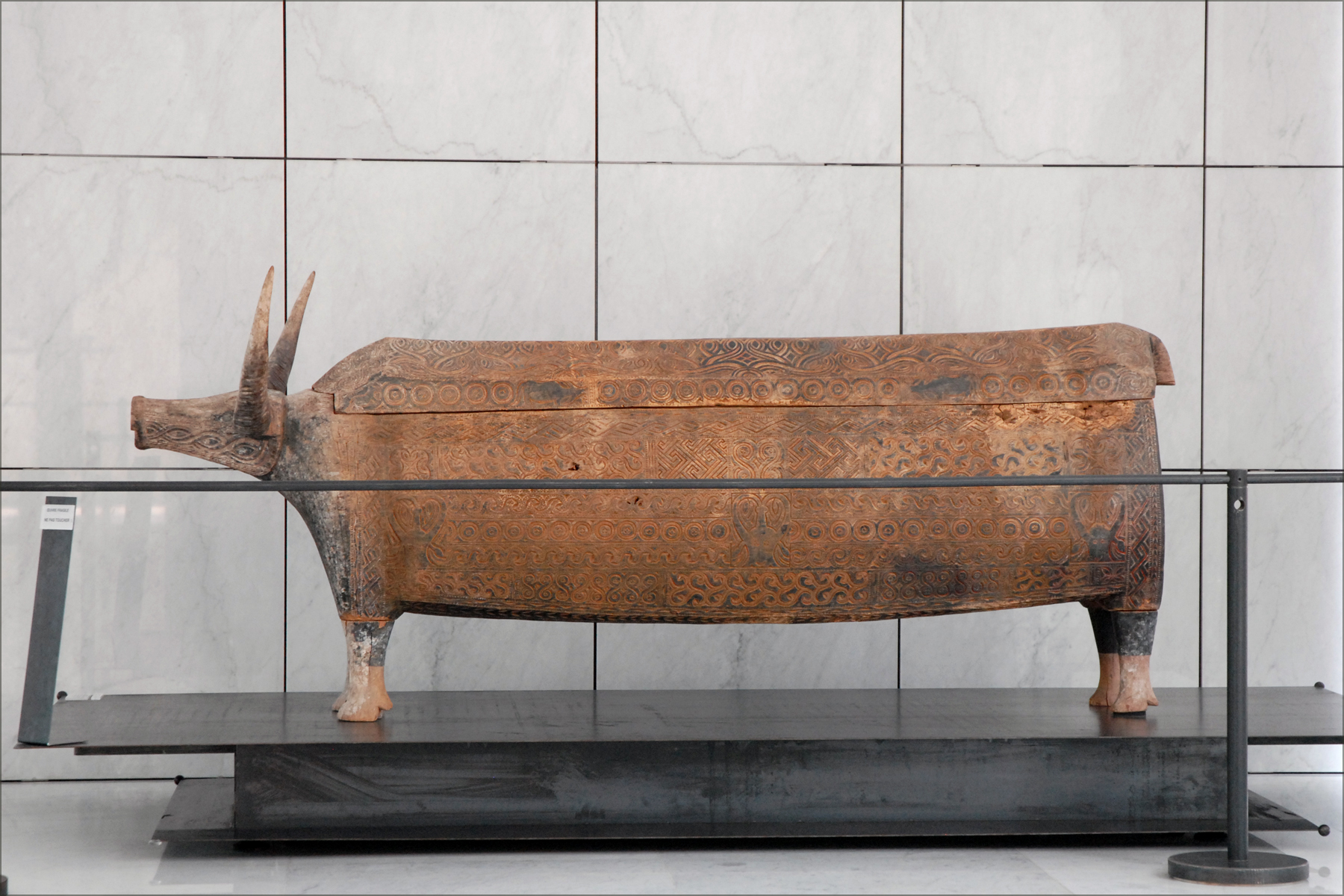
Water buffalo-shaped ossuary, Indonesia, Sulawesi (Celebes), Toraja Sa'dan ethnic group, 19th century. Engraved and polychrome teak wood, buffalo horns.

This zoomorphic sarcophagus, or erong, from the art of the Toraja Sa'dan, an important people of Sulawesi island in Indonesia, represents a water buffalo, a domesticated and sacrificial animal.

This ossuary is made entirely of wood and features a real pair of buffalo horns. It is fully carved. The decoration, inherited from the Dong Son civilization of Vietnam, includes motifs shaped like buffalo heads (wealth), broken keys (happiness for descendants), solar circles (nobility and greatness), woven bags (peace and happiness), and banyan tree leaves (fertility).

=== Vishnu ===
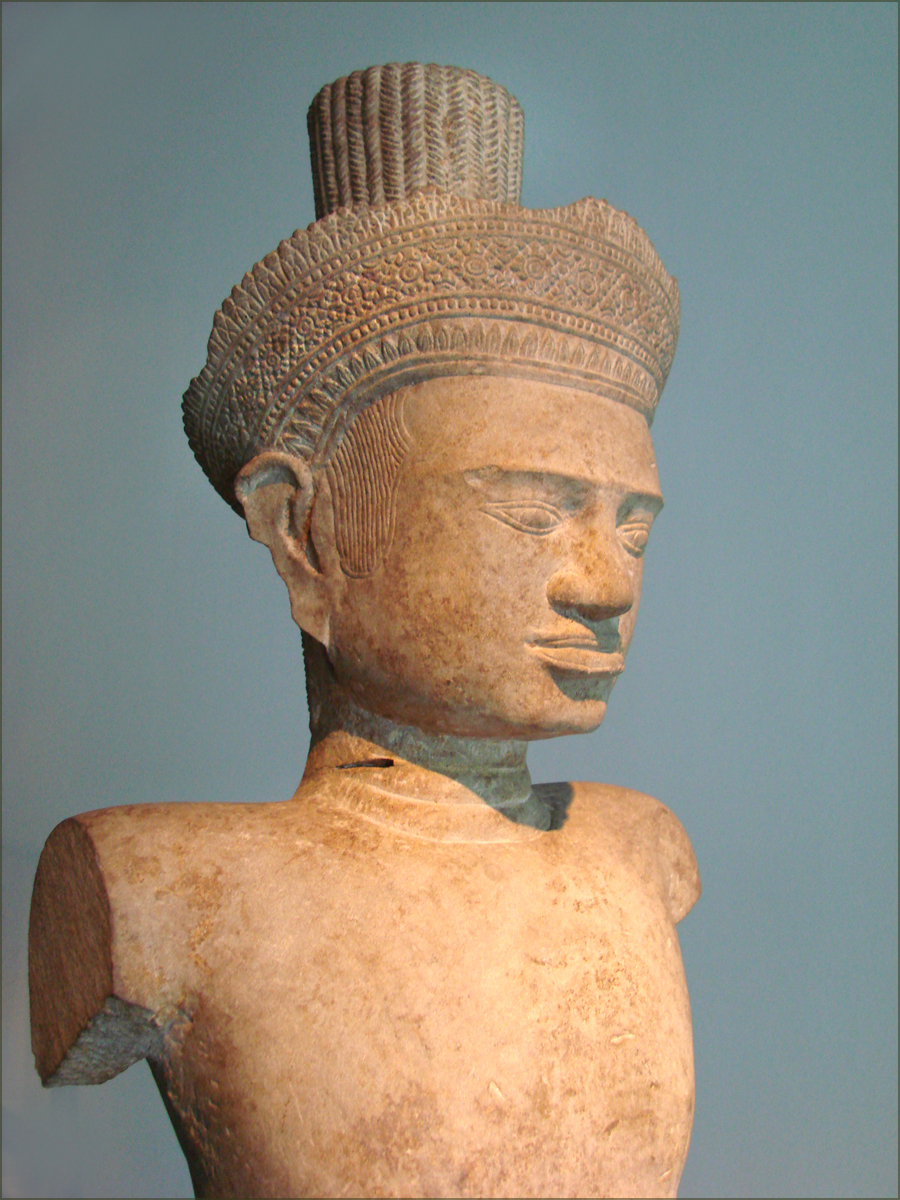
Cambodia, Angkor Wat style, 12th century, sandstone.

A statue of a male deity, made of sandstone, originating from Cambodia. It represents a deity, as shown by the diadem, an accessory reserved for gods and goddesses. This statue most likely represents the Hindu god Vishnu. The work was created in the early 12th century, under the reign of Suryavarman II. The eyes outlined with an incision extending toward the temples, the cylindrical bun hairstyle, and the costume are all markers of the “Angkor Wat style.”

Its original appearance was quite different from today’s: brightly painted, dressed in brocades, the god was also adorned with jewelry slipped into the earlobes.

=== Stag and hind symbolizing Buddha’s first sermon ===
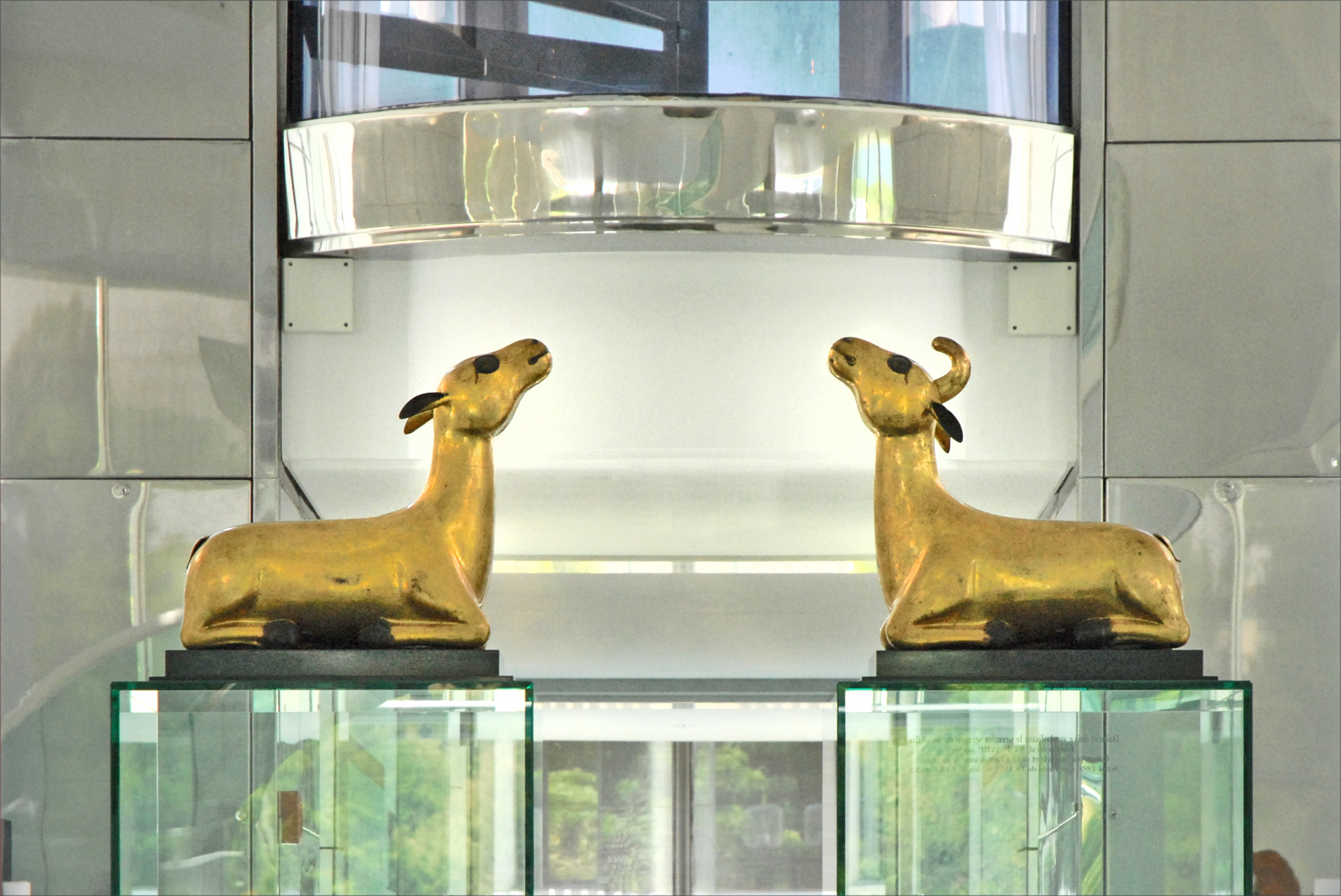
Central Tibet, 17th or 18th century, pure hammered copper gilded with mercury amalgam.

Originally, this pair of deer accompanied a Wheel of Dharma above the entrance gate of a Tibetan monastery.

Encountered from the early centuries CE in India and continually reproduced, these great Buddhist emblems evoke the first sermon of Buddha Sakyamuni after his enlightenment, in the Deer Park at Sarnath, near Benares, India.

=== The Gandhara ===
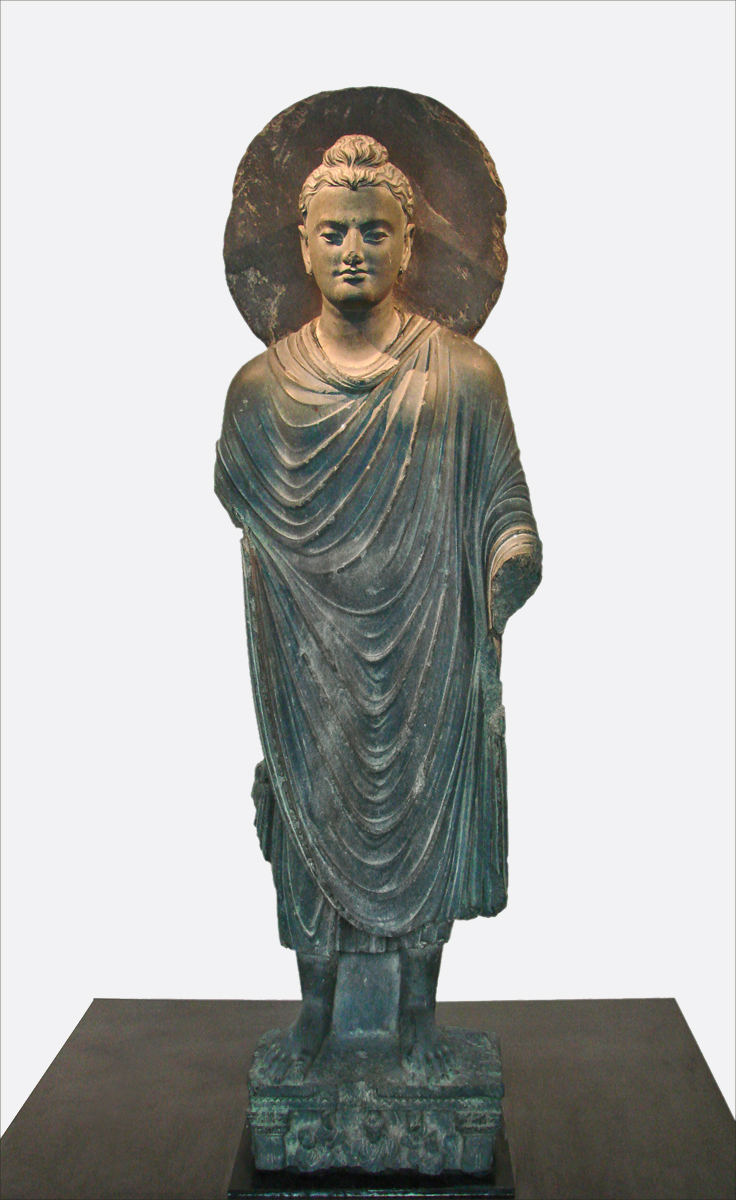
Standing Buddha, Gandhara, 2nd–3rd century.

Dated to the 2nd century, this sculpture is one of the oldest human representations of the Buddha. It is representative of Gandharan art, which developed from the 1st to the 3rd century in a region located between Afghanistan and Pakistan. A true cultural and commercial crossroads, Gandhara created original works synthesizing Indian and Greco-Roman art.

== See also ==
- Musée Guimet
