= Cabriolet (furniture) =

Louis XV style chair

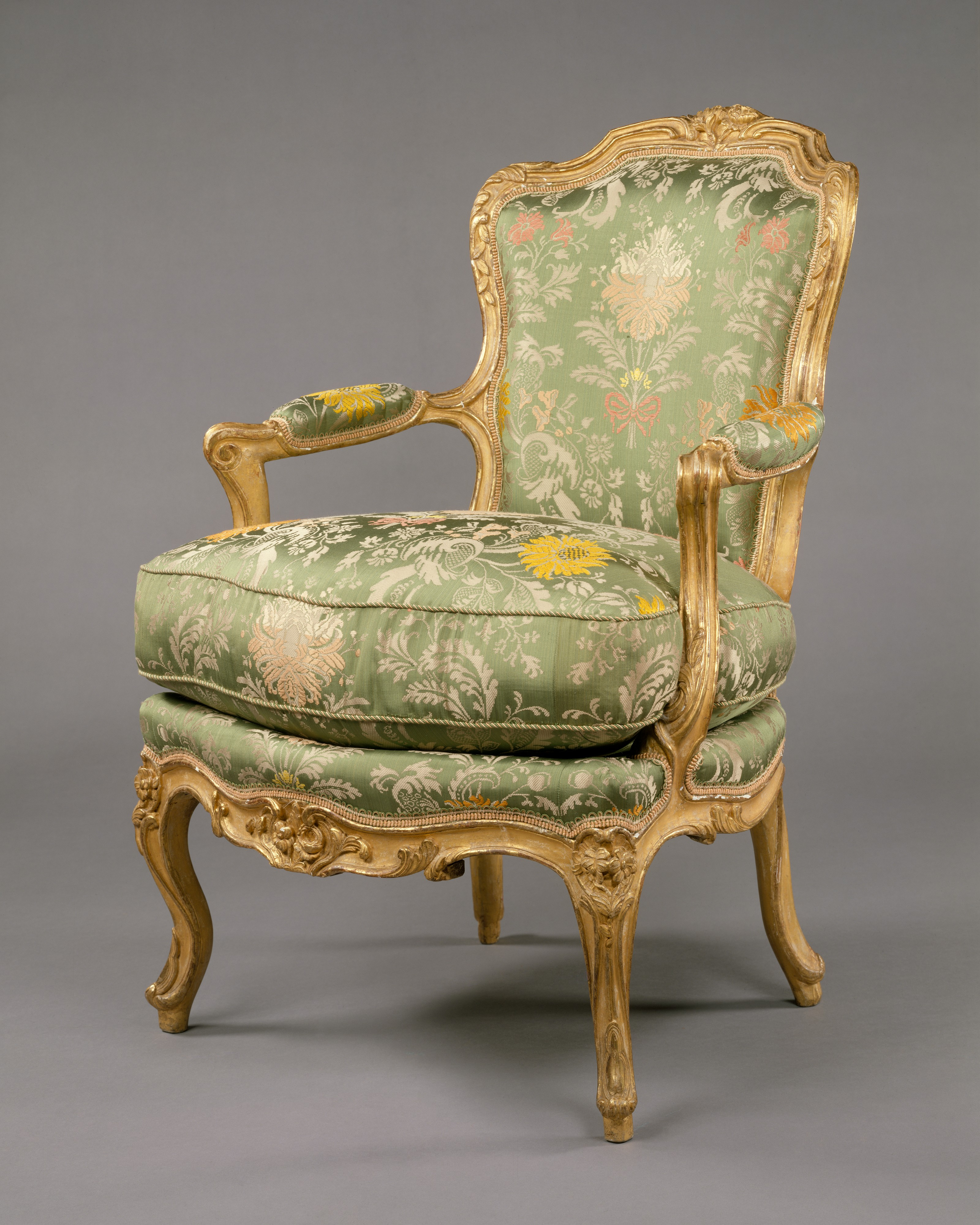
A fauteuil en cabriolet from c. 1750 – c. 1760

A cabriolet armchair is a Louis XV style chair with its armrests open and elevated from the seat, sculpted independently of the armchair, and making the chair light and easy to move. The fauteuil en cabriolet with a concave back and overstuffed seat cushion is a version of this.

== Design ==
The seat of the chair is wide, a design feature to accommodate large dresses. Facing the chair, the two front legs are turned outwards. The front of the seat is curved outwards, and the armrests are very open, in the style "en arbalète", or styled to resemble a drawn crossbow. The main difference between a cabriolet and an armchair à la reine is the shape of back of the chair. The cabriolet back is concave to hug the body, while armchairs à la reine have straight backs.

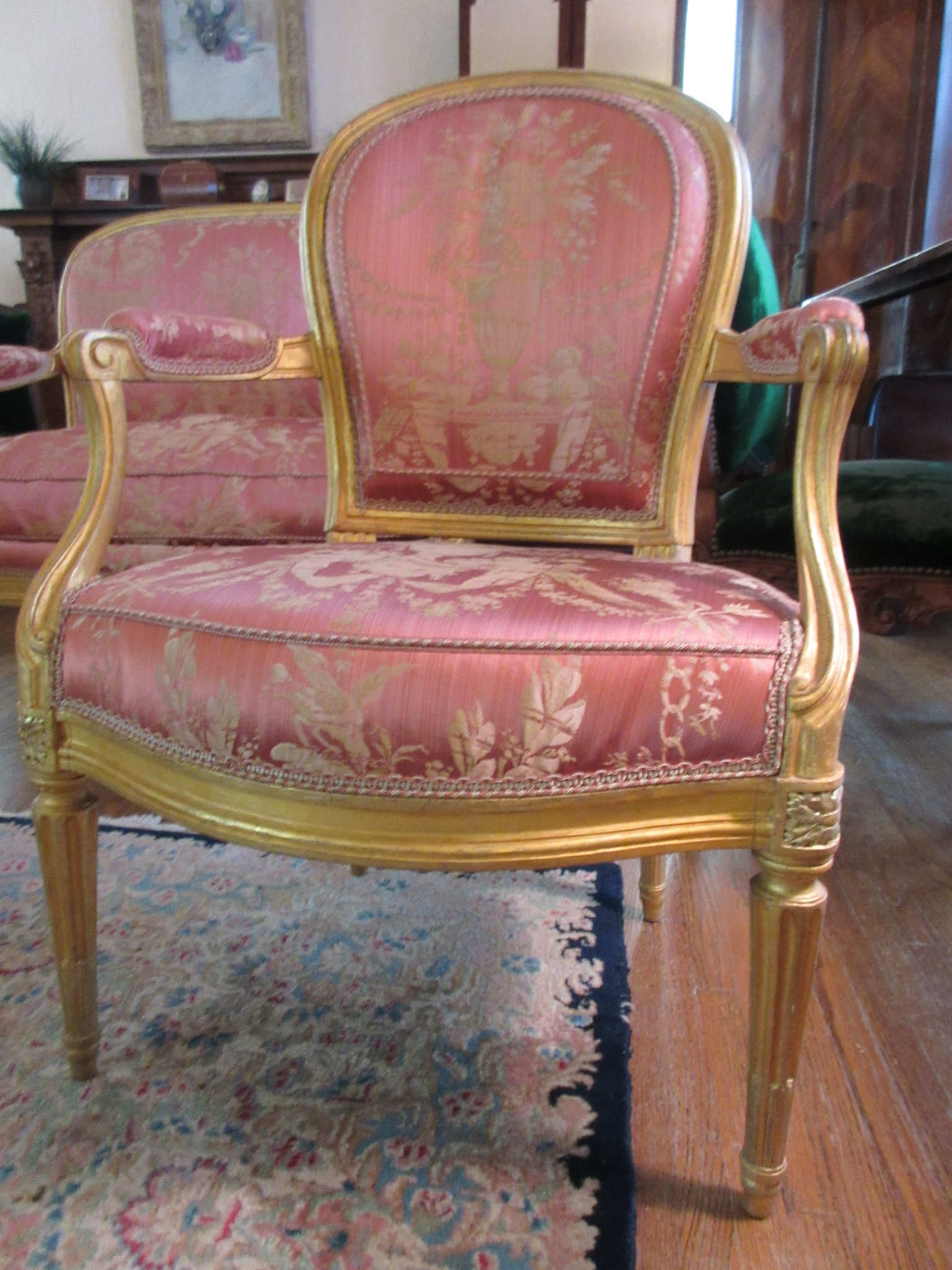
Cabriolet armchair (c. 1775, France), one of four made by Georges Jacob.

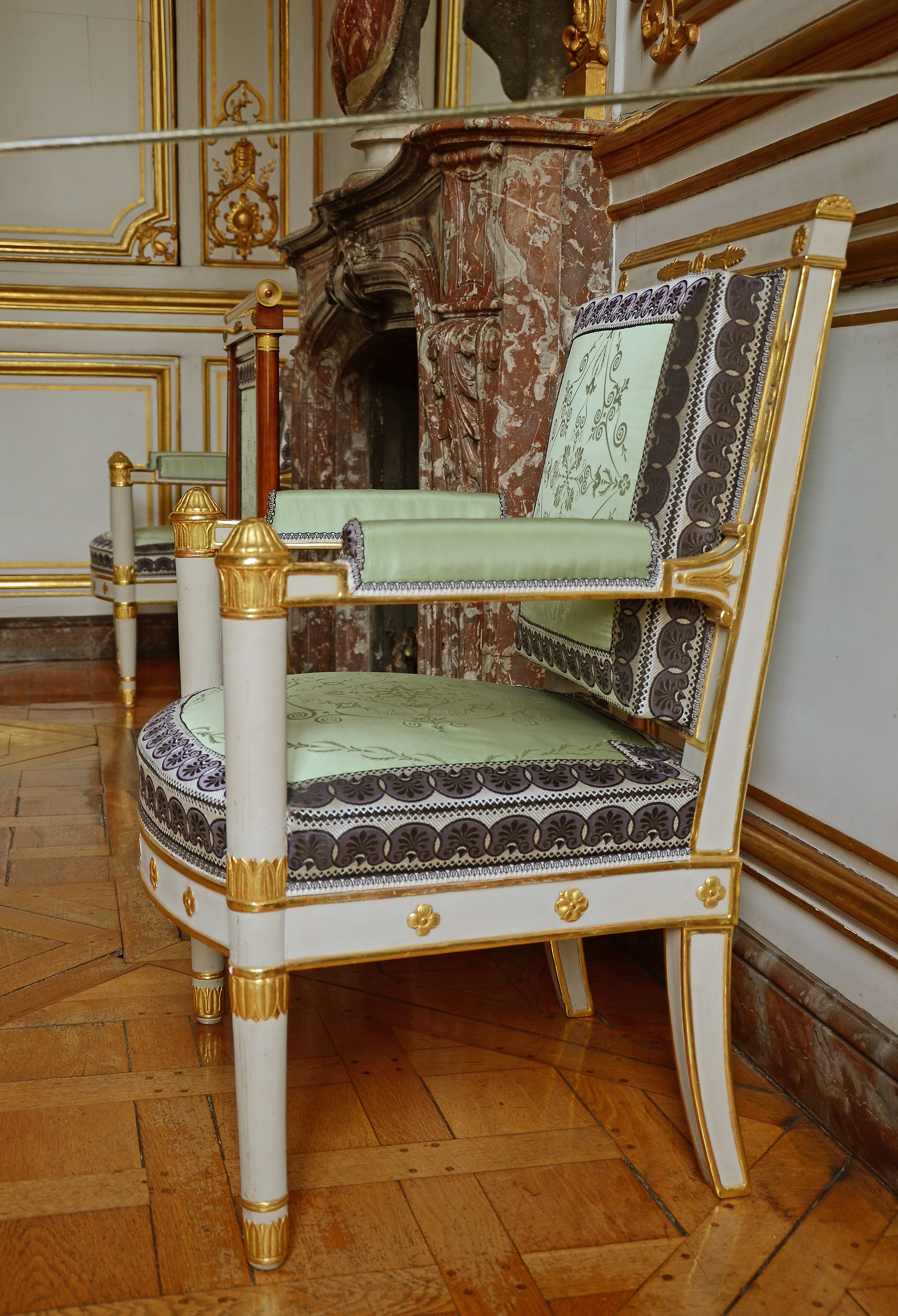
An armchair à la reine. Same as the cabriolet, but with a flat back. (Palais Rohan, Strasbourg)

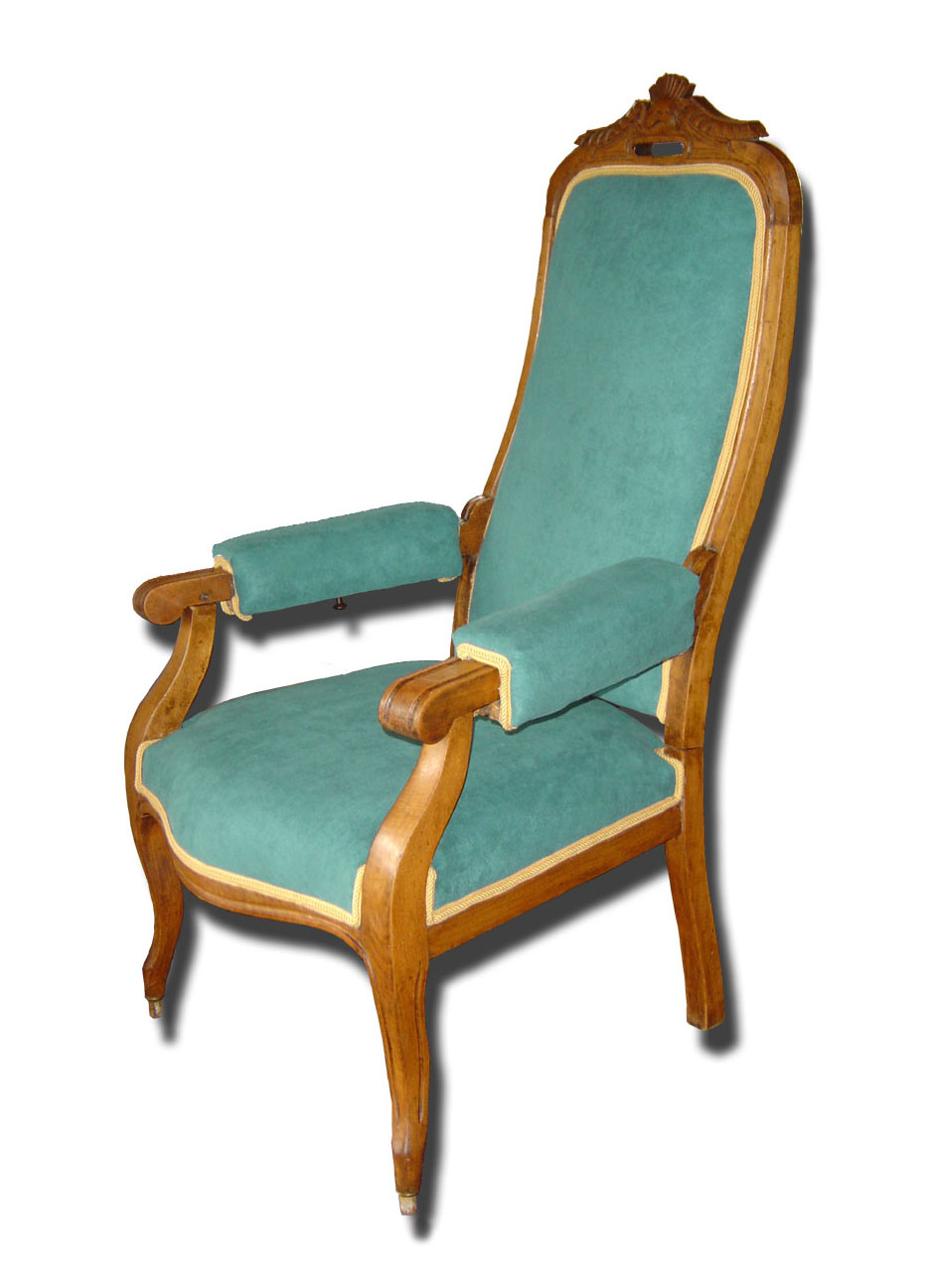
A Voltaire, which has a tall back and sometimes handles on the sides.

== See also ==
- Bergère – a similar style of chair that has enclosed, upholstered sides
- Louis XV furniture
- List of chairs
