= Garden Egg chair =

Chair designed by Peter Ghyczy in 1968

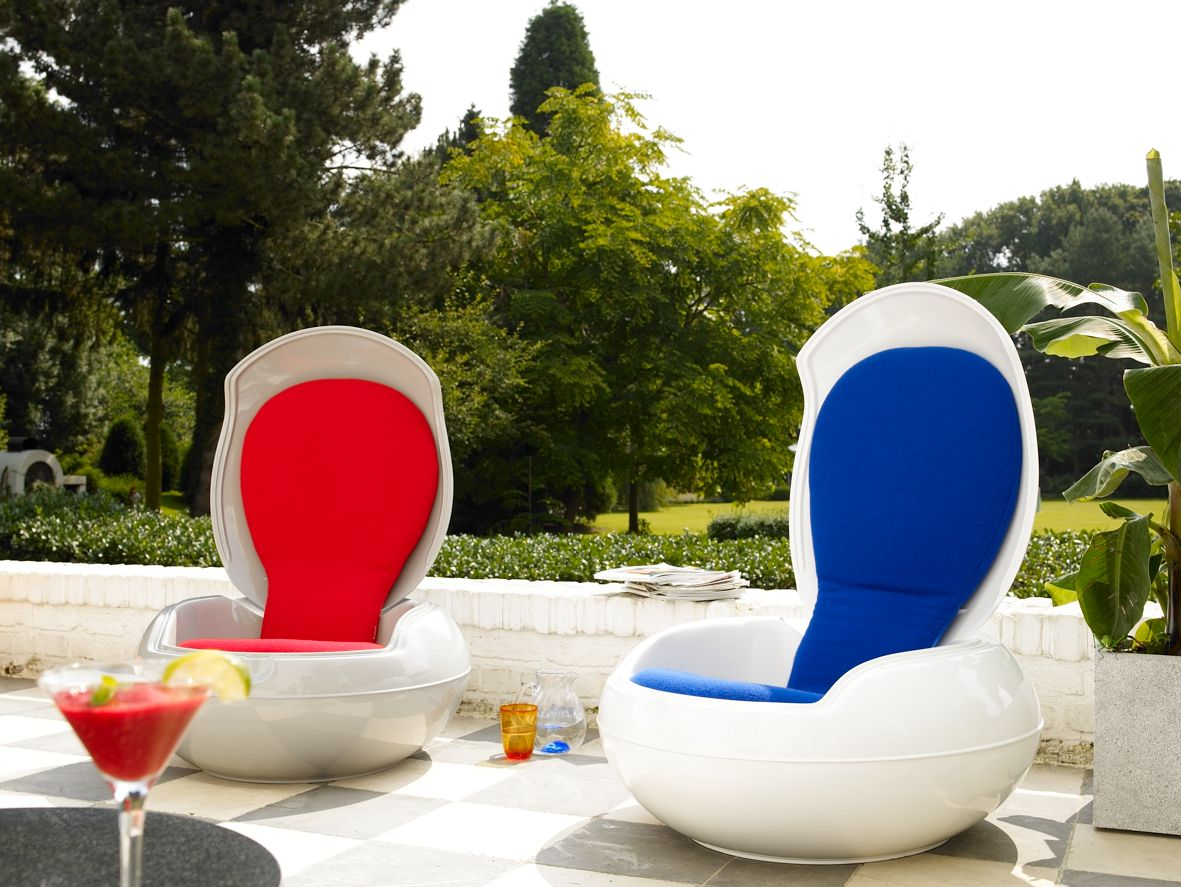
- Garden Egg chairs
- Designer: Peter Ghyczy
- Date: 1968
- Materials: Polyurethane frame. Leather or fabric inner.
- Style / tradition: Post-modernist
- Sold by: Reuter Products (Germany)
- Height: 98 cm (39 in)
- Width: 84 cm (33 in)
- Depth: 74 cm (29 in)

The Garden Egg chair was designed by Peter Ghyczy in 1968. Reuter Products manufactured it. The chair was designed for both indoor and outdoor use, although as a design icon and collectable, it is rarely used outdoors. The chair lid lifts and closes, and when closed, it is theoretically waterproof. The Egg chair was reintroduced in 2001 by Ghyczy Novo. The Garden Egg Chair is known by several names: Senftenberger Ei, pod chair, l’œuf en garden(egg)chair. Elastogran/Reuter produced the plastic polyurethane. Ghyczy's job was to establish a design centre to demonstrate polyurethane's potential to industrial customers. The Garden Egg Chair is one of the first chairs made with polyurethane. For a long time, the chair was produced by the East German company VEB-Synthese-Werk, but since 1998, it has been produced in the Netherlands.

== Designer ==
Peter Ghyczy (born 1940 in Budapest) left his native Hungary in 1956 because of the revolution and moved to West Germany. Here he finished his high school and studied at the Düsseldorf Art Academy and University of Aachen. After graduating, he began his career as head of the design department at Elastogran/Reuter, where he developed the Garden Egg Chair in 1968. What he saw as the traditional way of working at Elastogran/Reuter led him to leave the company in 1972. He moved to the Netherlands and started his own company, called "Ghyczy".

== Modern Interpretations ==
Modern garden egg chairs utilize a new rattan-effect synthetic material to create a woven basket-like chair (often hanging from a frame) that simulates the original egg chair shape. They are frequently called a "hanging egg chair" or "rattan egg chair".

== See also ==
- List of chairs
