= Wing chair =

Type of high-backed chair

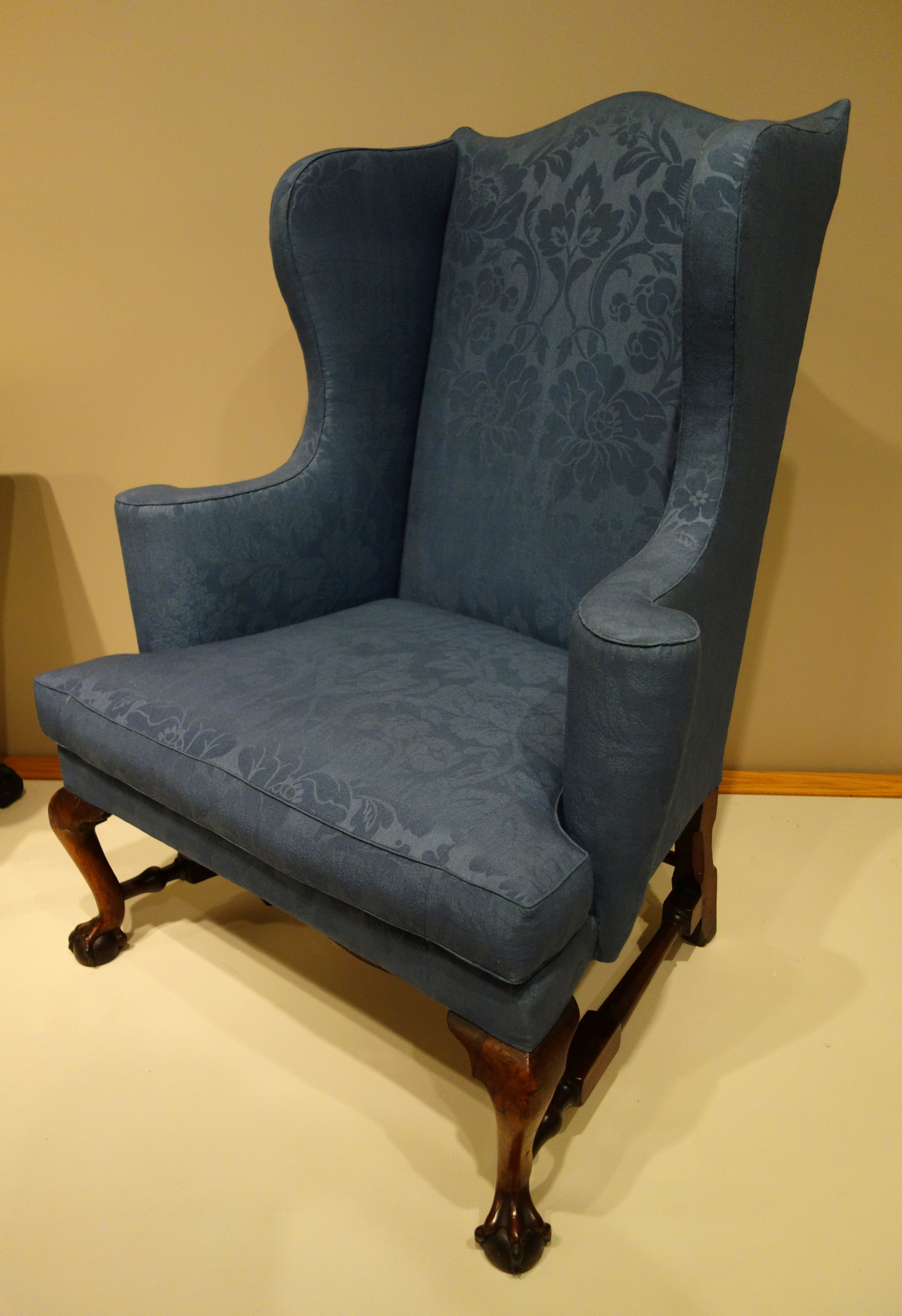
An 18th-century wing chair

A wing chair (also, wing-back chair, wing-back or armchair) is an easy chair or club chair with "wings" attached to the back of the chair, typically, but not always, stretching down to the arm rest. The purpose of the "wings" was to shield the occupant of the chair from draughts and to trap the heat from a fireplace in the area where the person would be sitting. Hence, in the past, these were often used near a fireplace. Currently, most examples of wing chairs are fully upholstered with exposed wood legs, but many of the oldest examples of wing chairs have an exposed frame with padded cushions at the seat, armrests, back, and sometimes wings. The first chair design featuring these "wings" was entirely made of wood, historically used by barber-surgeons, with the wings functioning to prevent draughts from blowing hair, blood and other bodily fluids around during surgery.

They were first introduced in England during the 1600s, and the basic design has remained unchanged. They did not become popular until the 1720s.

Though there are many types of wing chairs, there are two standard wing styles: the flat wing and the scroll wing. There are also bat wings and butterfly wings, among other types. The length, depth, vertical position, and shape of the wings may vary from chair to chair.

== See also ==
- Fauteuil
- List of chairs
- Woodcutters, a Thomas Bernhard novel in which the narrator repeatedly references the fact that they are sitting in a wing chair.
