= Peter Ghyczy =

German designer of Hungarian origin (born 1940)

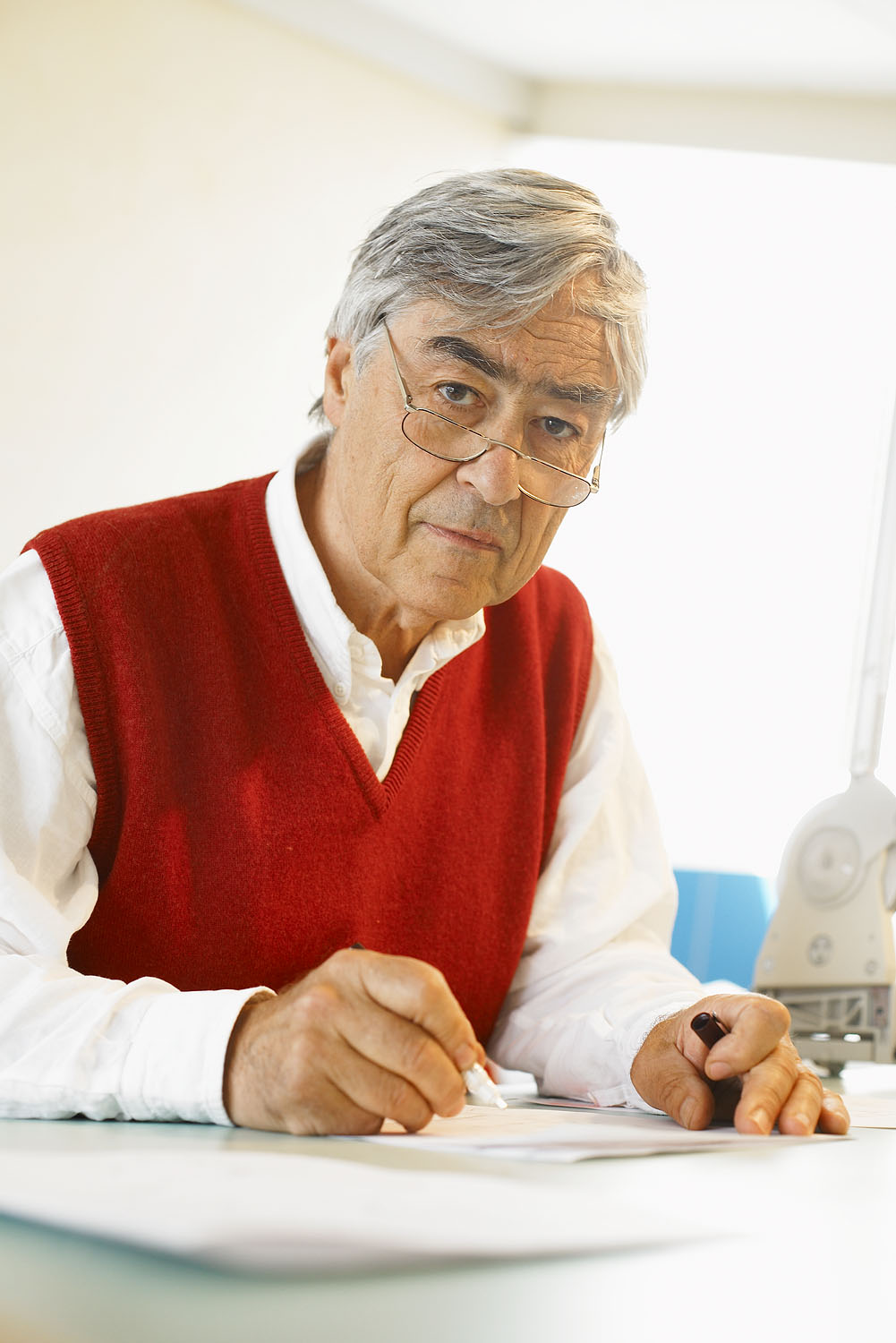
- Peter Ghyczy
- Born: 1 December 1940; Budapest, Hungary
- Died: 10 March 2022 (aged 81); The Netherlands
- Occupation: designer

Peter Ghyczy (1 December 1940 – 10 March 2022) was a German designer of Hungarian origin, who lived in the Netherlands.

== Biography ==
Peter Ghyczy, child of a widespread aristocratic family, grew up in Buda, a fine district of Budapest. After the invasion of the Red Army 1945, in which his father was killed, he was sent to the family's property Vásárosnameny in the Puszta plains, where he also visited the village school. In 1947 he was brought to Belgium by the International Red Cross for one year, where he learned French.

After the family was expropriated of their estate, he returned to his mother in Budapest, where he finished primary school. From 1954 on he attended the Benedictine Secondary School in Pannonhalma connected to a famous monastery. 1956, after the crushing of the Hungarian uprising against the communist regime, he fled with his mother and brother via Vienna to Bonn.

In 1960 he attained his "Abitur" (A level) and started to study architecture at the Technical University of Aachen specializing on constructional engineering. Beginning in 1961 he assisted professor Rudolf Steinbach, a renowned German architect, and later worked at the institute of plastic research. In between he took jobs in Paris and at a Unesco project in Kalabsha, Egypt, which was saving antique ruins from a reservoir. 1967 he graduated as an architect in Aachen with a thesis on unconventional school buildings.

From 1968 to 1972 he lived in Lemförde in the South of Lower Saxony. In 1969 he became a German citizen. Peter Ghyczy is married and father of four. He lived in Beesel near the river of Maas at the eastern border of the Netherlands until his death on March 10, 2022.

=== Work as a designer ===
Peter Ghyczy is one of several designers in the 20th century who were also immigrants – among them Henry van de Velde, Marcel Breuer, Hans Gugelot, Peter Maly – and had a major impact on German and international design. In 1968 he took a leading position at the company Elastogran in Lemförde in southern Lower Saxony, where he was responsible for the development of products made from polyurethane. Owner of the company Gottfried Reuter, former chemist at Bayer in Leverkusen, was an expert in the field of polyurethane production, for which he held several patents. In the 1960s he formed a company group (with a turnover of a few hundred million Deutschmarks based on these patents).

Between 1968 and 1972 Peter Ghyczy developed many innovative designs, which identified him as one of the most productive designers of these years. In 1970 the Design-Center in Lemförde was inaugurated, built according to Ghyczy's design, made completely from polyurethane and being the first of its kind. It was one of the early German design studios, whose close cooperation between product design and technical development was unheard of in the plastics industry until then. This design studio gave birth to many novel, modular components, such as shelters, facade elements but most notably various types of furniture, among them chairs, shell chairs, sectional sofas, tables, shelves and plastic door fronts for offices and kitchens.

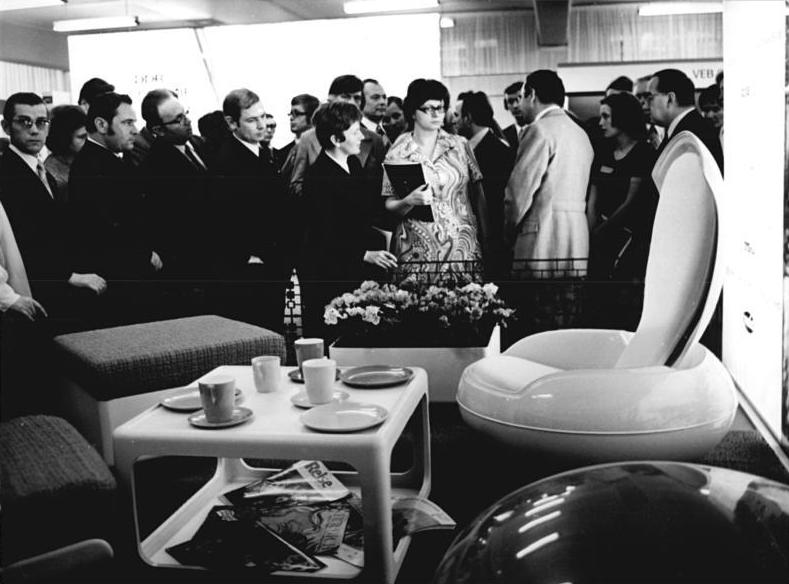
furniture fair presenting garden egg chair

Licenses were given to well-known companies, among others Drabert, "die Vereinigten Werkstätten", Vitra (at the time still named Fehlbaum GmbH), and Beylarian in the USA. Of all these only one model came to fame: das Gartenei from 1968, the first hinged armchair. The Design-Center was closed as early as 1972 and later demolished. Reuter sold his company to BASF and - more or less secretly - his polyurethane technology to the GDR, which was given the Gartenei along with it. This led to the fact that a chemical plant in Senftenberg produced it in unknown quantities. After the fall of the "iron curtain" it made a reappearance as "Senftenberger Ei" - often falsely seen as an East German design - in the art scene of the late 90s, where it turned into a highly desired collector's item, Peter Ghyczy now produces his own re-edition.

In 1972 he founded Ghyczy + Co Design in Viersen and presented his first furniture collection. It was based on casting techniques which he transferred from plastics to metal. He patented many of his developments, especially for his innovative method clamping glass and metal together. He used this technique for a new type of "frameless" table, which has often been copied and which he used as a basis for an entire product line. Finally the also patented "frameless" shelf R03 came around which has long made its way - as plagiarism - into many furniture stores.

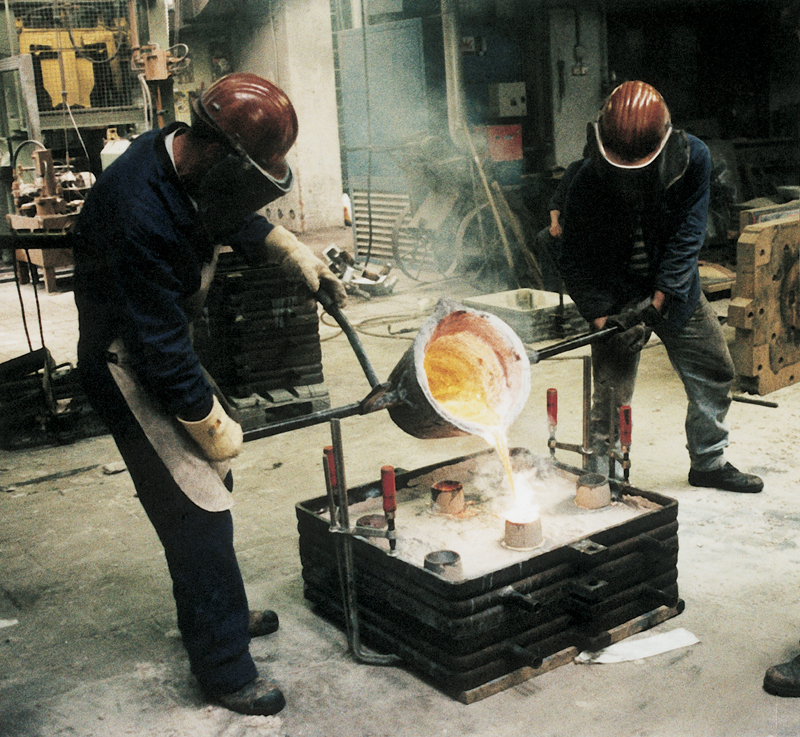
molding at the production site, Swalmen the Netherlands

Peter Ghyczy designed numerous lamps, for example the series MegaWatt and the table lamp MW 17, a curved, balanced tabular steel Rohr; another "frameless" construction - an idea, which resembles a famous piece in design history, the "legless" "Freischwinger" presented by Mart Stam and Ludwig Mies van der Rohe in 1927. Peter Ghyczy often used cast metal parts. This methode derives from his early experiences with plastic castings.

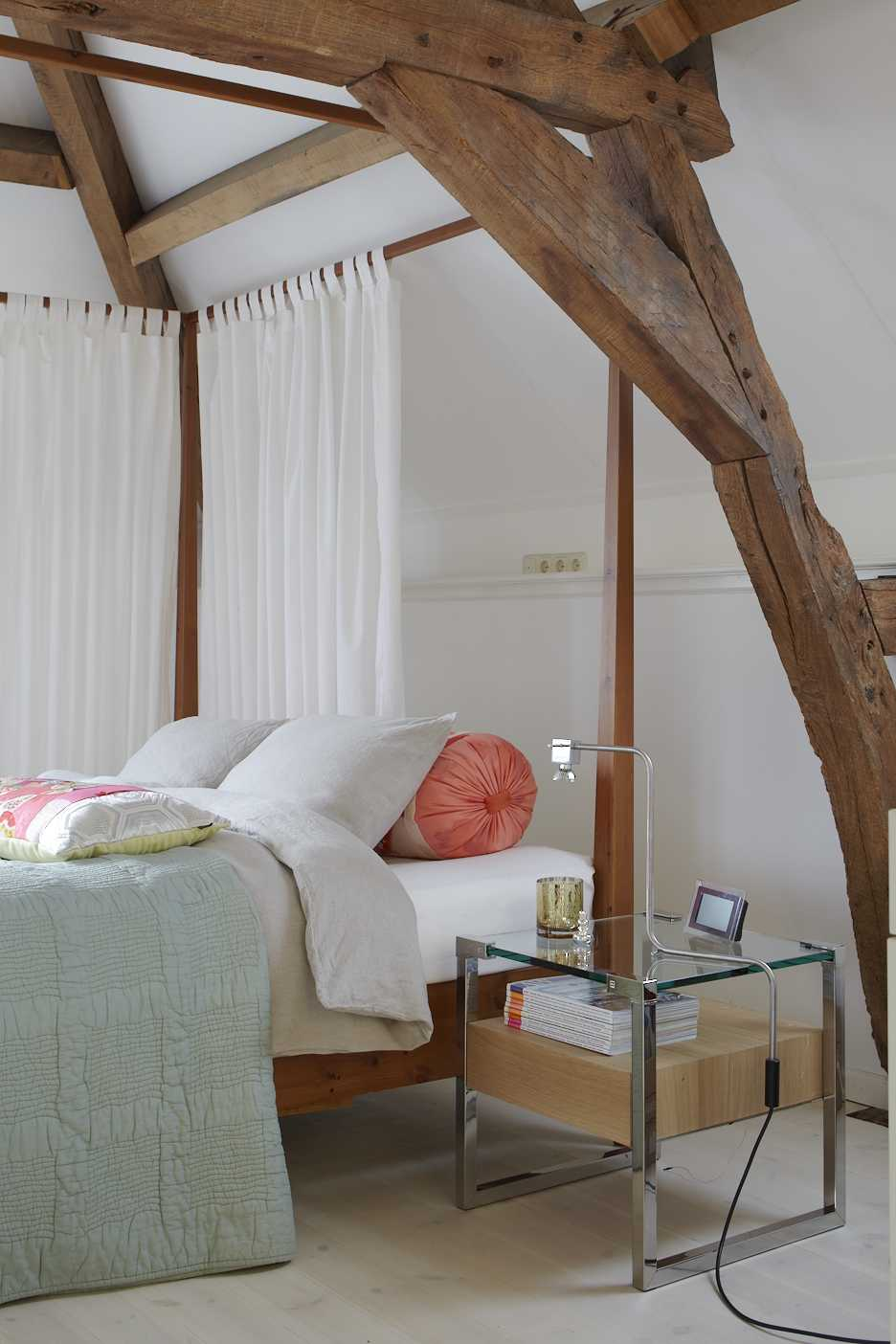
showing bedside table T53L and lamp MW17 (Bruno)

In 1974 Peter Ghyczy moved his company Ghyczy Selection to the Netherlands. In 1985 it moved to Swalmen, where it remains until today.
