= Parc Phœnix =

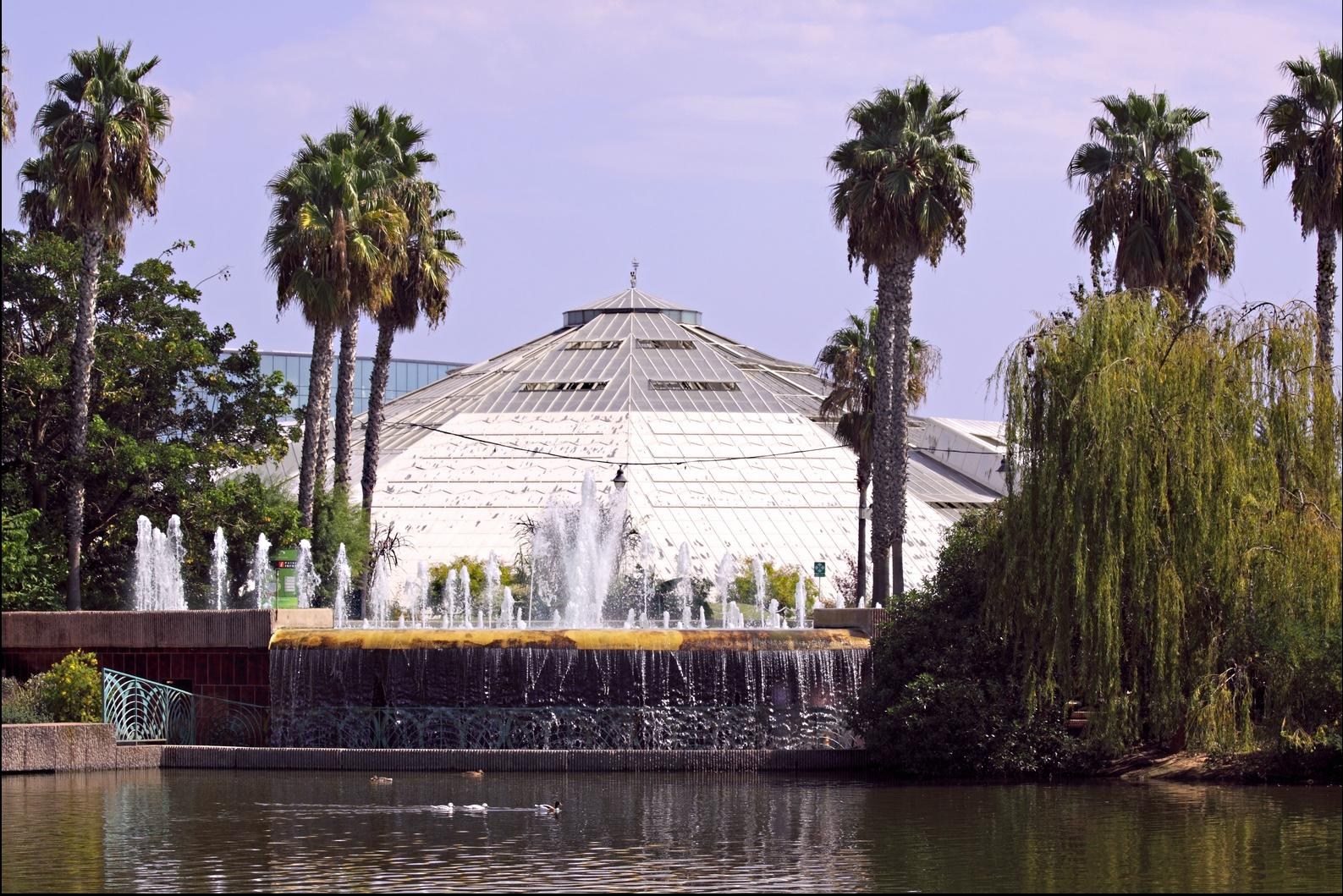
- The greenhouse
- Interactive map of Parc Phœnix
- 43°40′01″N 7°12′10″E
- Date opened: February 1990
- Location: Nice, Alpes-Maritimes, France
- Land area: 7 ha (17 acres)
- Website: www.parc-phoenix.org

Parc Phœnix is a 7-hectare (17-acre) botanical garden and zoo in Nice, Alpes-Maritimes, France.

== Location and history ==
The park was opened in February 1990, and is located at the southwestern edge of Nice, in the l'Arenas district, along the Promenade des Anglais. The park has an inner body of water. The park is divided into several zones, such as a tropical zone, a Mediterranean garden, and areas reserved for animals.

== Exterior gardens ==
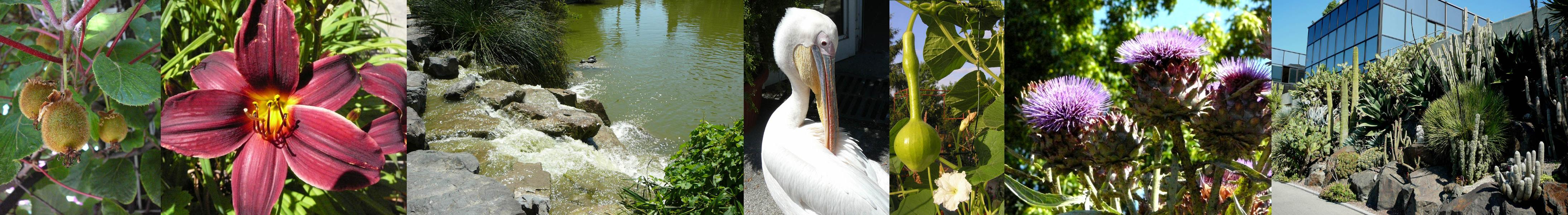
Animals and plants outside the greenhouse.

The park consists mostly of a large greenhouse with a large pool, hosting animals such as pelicans, swans, ducks and turtles. Other animals living in the park live in cages.

== The greenhouse ==
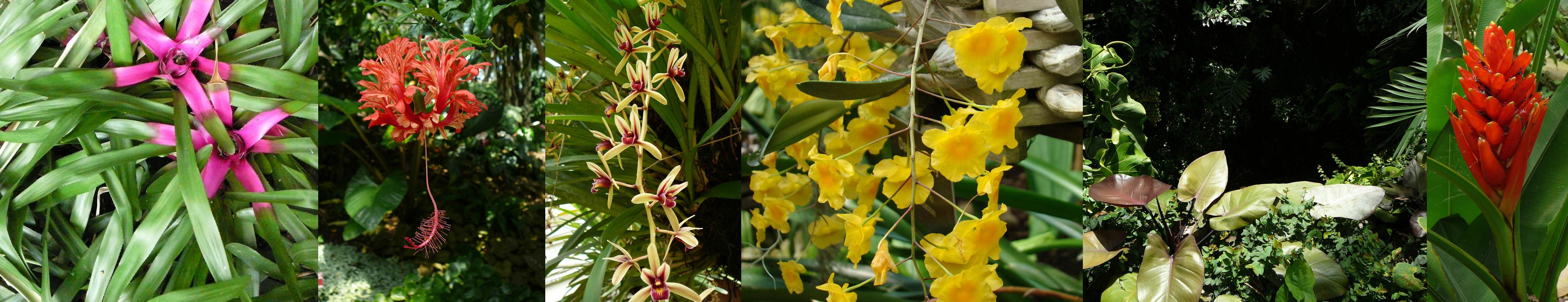
Plants inside the greenhouse

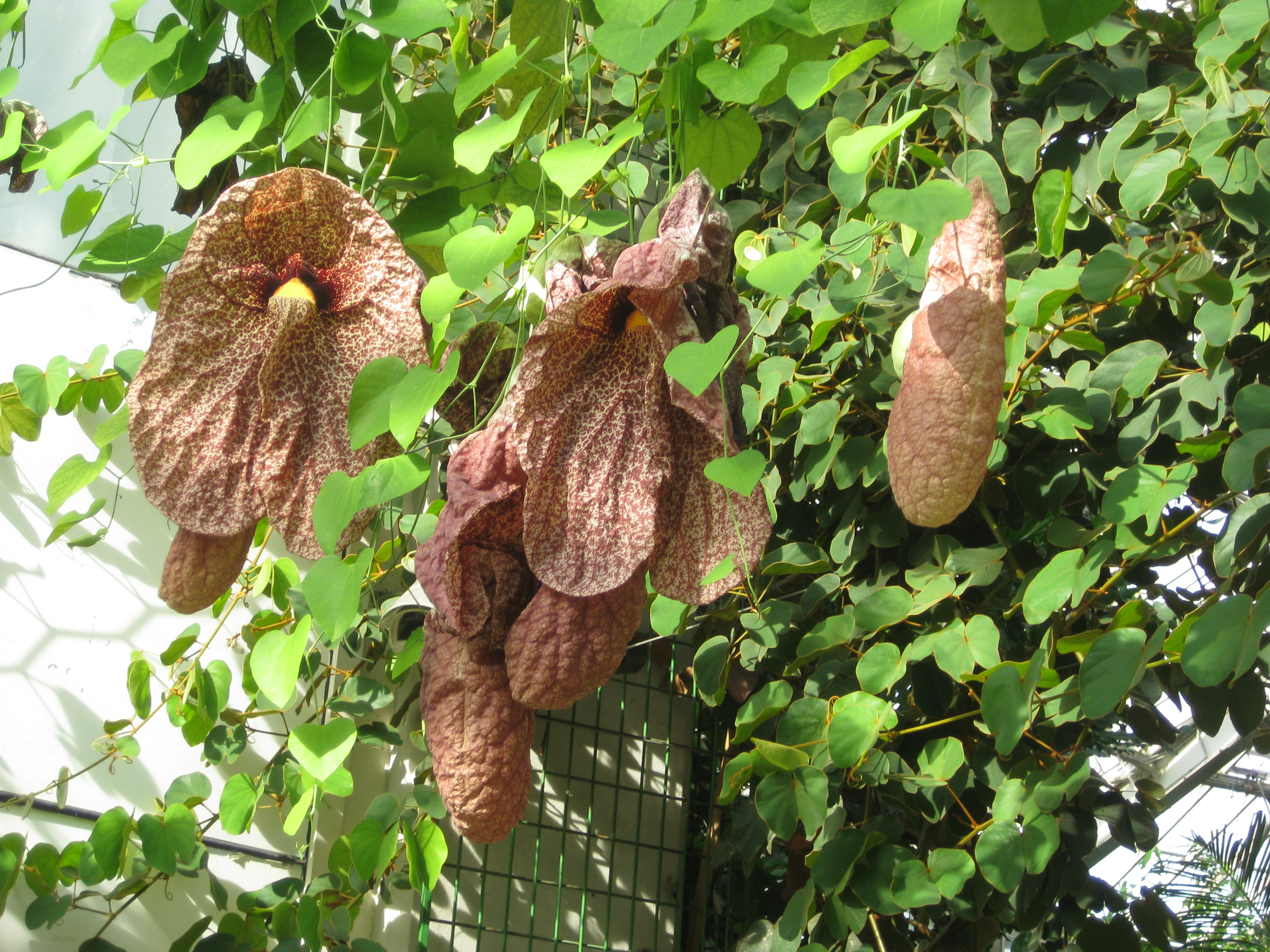
Aristoloche

The greenhouse in the park, with an area of 7,000 square metres (75,000 sq ft) and a height of 25 metres (82 ft), is one of the largest greenhouses in Europe and is divided into seven zones. There you can see different animals and birds, like flamingos, turtles, as well as a big variety of insects.

== Temporary expositions ==
The park regularly hosts temporary expositions about nature.
