= Club chair =

Type of armchair

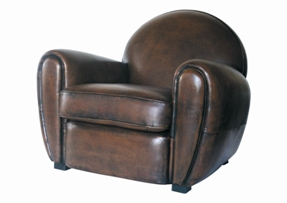
Round brown club chair

A club chair is a type of armchair, usually covered in leather. It was created and made in France. Before it came to be known under its current name, it first appeared as the fauteuil confortable, the 'comfortable armchair'. It was given this name to distinguish it from the fauteuil de style, which had straighter lines and was less enveloping.

The craftsmen involved in the design of the chair are unknown. The origins of the term "club" are unclear, but it may be a reference to the gentlemen's club.

== History ==
Throughout the 19th century, the design and construction of club chairs evolved significantly. Initially large and heavy with solid wooden frames, they became more refined and tailored over time. The mid-19th century saw the introduction of coil springs in cushioning, leading to more compact and sleeker designs.

Post-World War II, the design of club chairs was influenced by American soldiers stationed in France, and elements like the heavy barrel arms of some chairs are reminiscent of airplane fuselages and leather bomber jackets. Traditional sheep's leather is used for authenticity, and the tanning process allows imperfections and wrinkles to remain visible on the stretched leather, giving each chair a unique appearance. Different models can be identified by the shape of their backs, such as round, chapeau de gendarme, square, cloud, and moustache backs.

== Characteristics ==
=== Shape ===
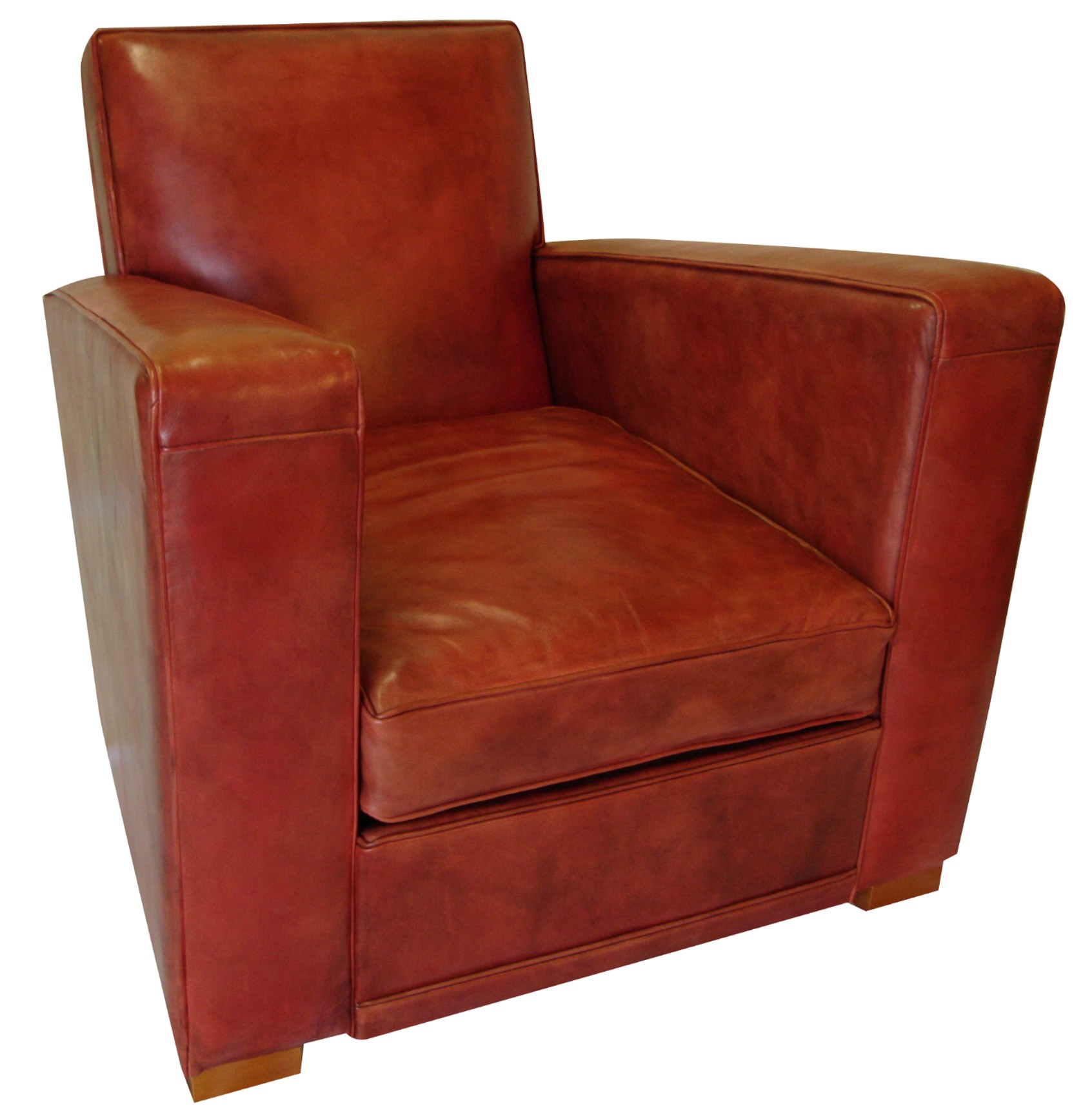
Art Deco club chair

The club chair is part of the Art Deco era which featured armchairs with clean, flexible lines, in contrast to the Art Nouveau style of the 1910s.

After the Second World War, dozens of different shapes appeared. Some have stood the test of time, such as the "moustache" and the "gendarme’s hat," named after the shape of the backrest.

=== Manufacture ===
Design, carpentry, fellmongery, upholstery and colouring are the main crafts involved in the manufacture of a club armchair. Each chair is a product of all this combined expertise.

The club armchair first appeared at the start of the 20th century, with the application of a new padding technique, using double conical springs not only in the seat cushion but also in the backrest and armrests. Coir filling supplemented the suppleness of these springs.

Industrial progress led to the replacement of this padding method with no-sag springs or elastic webbing, together with synthetic foam.

=== Covering ===
Coverings have changed as industrial techniques have developed, and have included Mercerised cotton, velvet, calfskin and, most recently, bi-cast leather. However, sheep's leather is still considered the authentic material for chairs.

With a vegetable-tanned sheep's leather covering, the marks and defects in the skin are visible through the dye, making each chair unique. Furthermore, the particularly fine grain gives the armchair a unique patina over time. French leather was renowned for its quality in the 19th century.

Between six and eight skins of approximately 0.8 square metres (8.6 sq ft) each are required to cover an armchair. They are applied wet, stretched as tightly as possible, and contract as they dry. They will last around 40 years.
