= Fauteuil =

Style of open-armchair

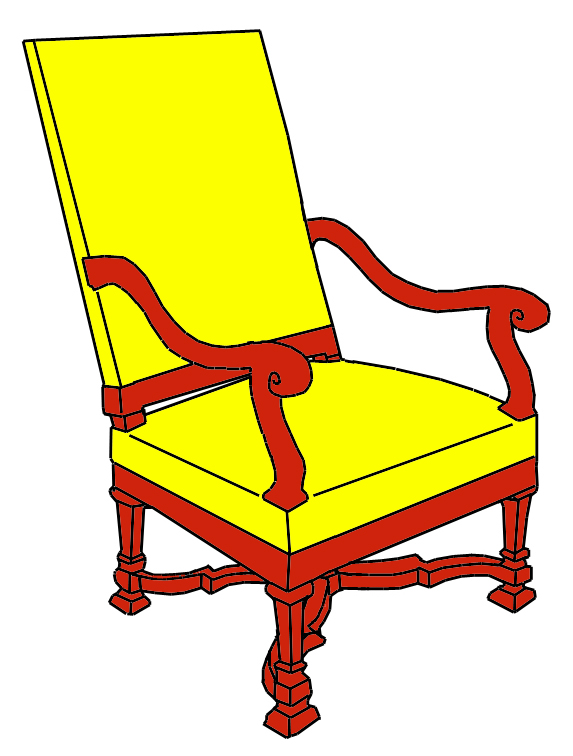
A fauteuil (elbow chair)

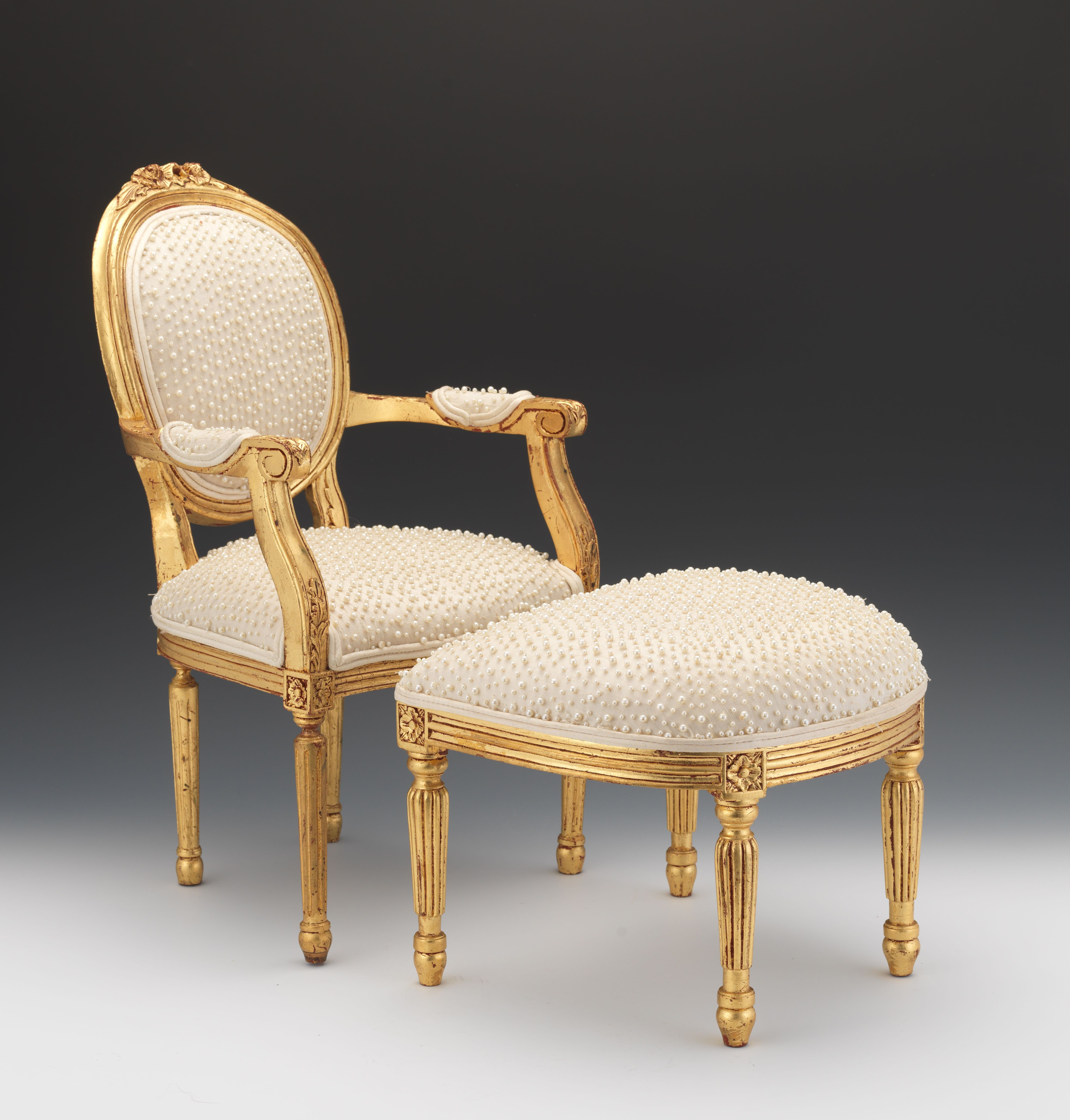
A Louis XVI-style fauteuil gold foiled chair with faux pearls and ottoman

A fauteuil (French: [fotœj]) is a style of open-armchair with a primarily exposed wooden frame originating in France during the early 17th century. A fauteuil is made of wood and frequently with carved relief ornament. It is typically upholstered on the seat, the seat back and on the arms (manchettes). Some fauteuils have a valenced front seat rail which is padding that extends slightly over the apron. The exposed wooden elements are often gilded or otherwise painted.

The word can be used as a synecdoche to refer to membership in the Académie Française.

== See also ==
- Bergere
- Couch
- Louis XVI
