= Stoll Giroflex =

Swiss furniture company

Stoll Giroflex AG is a Swiss manufacturer of seating furniture. The company, with its main office in Koblenz (AG), Switzerland, has branches, offices and licensees worldwide. The Espisa AG plastics factory in Koblenz is also part of the Giroflex Group.

== History ==
In 1872 Albert Stoll I established a chair factory in Koblenz which focused on the production of bentwood chairs for cafés, hotels and stores. Starting in 1919, his son, Albert Stoll ll, concentrated on the development and production of office chairs. In 1926, he invented the "Federdreh" ("Spring swivel"), which quickly became famous and was patented worldwide. This was the first swivel chair with a suspension system. The brand name "Giroflex" (turn and flex) can be traced back to this invention. In 1948 the brand name “Giroflex” was introduced. In 1949 Giroflex began to expand abroad: moves into Belgium and Brazil were followed by the establishment of additional locations in Germany, the Netherlands and France. The production facility and the centre for research and development are still located in Koblenz today.

== Products ==
Giroflex offers seating furniture for many purposes. Swivel chairs, conference armchairs, visitor's chairs, stools, seating groups and special chairs are available for office, industry and residential use.

== Designers working for Giroflex ==
Paolo Fancelli

Carmen und Urs Greutmann

Walser Design
