= A Taxonomy of Office Chairs =

Non-fiction work by Jonathan Olivares

- Author: Jonathan Olivares
- Language: English
- Subject: Furniture design and manufacture
- Published: 2011
- Publisher: Phaidon Press
- Pages: 240
- ISBN: 978-0-7148-6103-6
- OCLC: 681495449

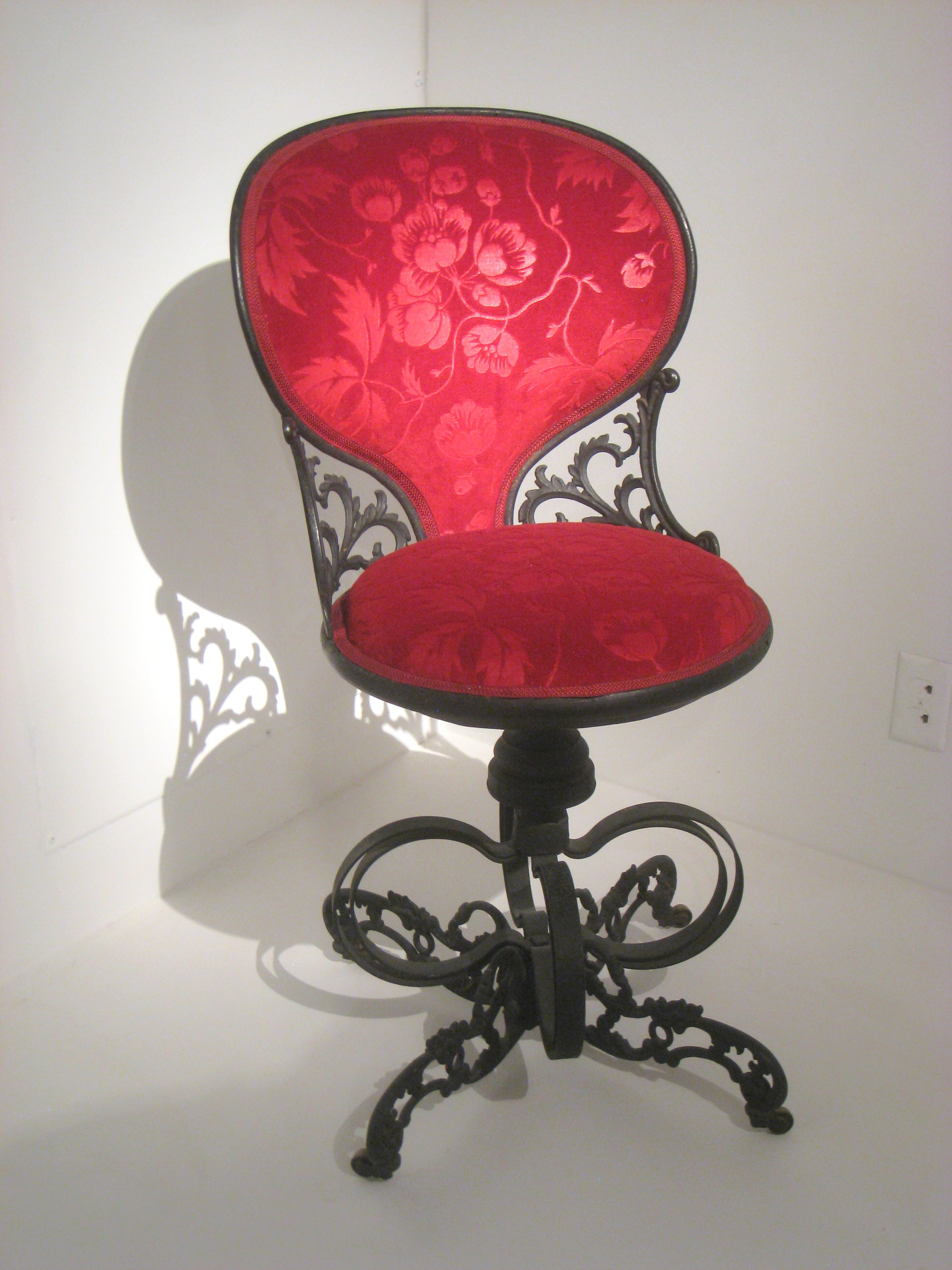
Centripetal Spring office chair designed by Thomas E. Warren for the American Chair Company (c. 1849)

A Taxonomy of Office Chairs is a 2011 book by Jonathan Olivares. It is a scholarly work that applies scientific methods primarily associated with "post-Linnaean" classification of biological taxa to a specific furniture typology. According to the Los Angeles Review of Books, it is "a serious attempt to visualize the evolutionary breakthroughs and mutations often taken for granted when considering the various industrialized objects that 'make up our predominant reality.'"

== Description ==
A Taxonomy of Office Chairs examines and analyses over 130 examples of the titular furniture typology considered to be the most innovative. The book spans from familiar mid-century modern classics like the Eames Aluminum Group to the Aeron chair, the "gold standard" archetype of 1990s ergonomic seating, together with more obscure but no less influential designs dating from the mid-19th to the early 21st century. Iconic pieces conceived by well known architects and designers including Marcel Breuer, Charles and Ray Eames, Richard Sapper, and Frank Lloyd Wright are dissected alongside lesser known designs such as early cast iron Centripetal Spring office chairs, Emilio Ambasz's Vertebra chairs, and Peter Opsvik's "anti-chairs" – as well as Darwin's own contribution to the evolution of the typology through the addition of a wheeled metal base to an upholstered armchair in order to facilitate gliding from one specimen to another in his Kent study.

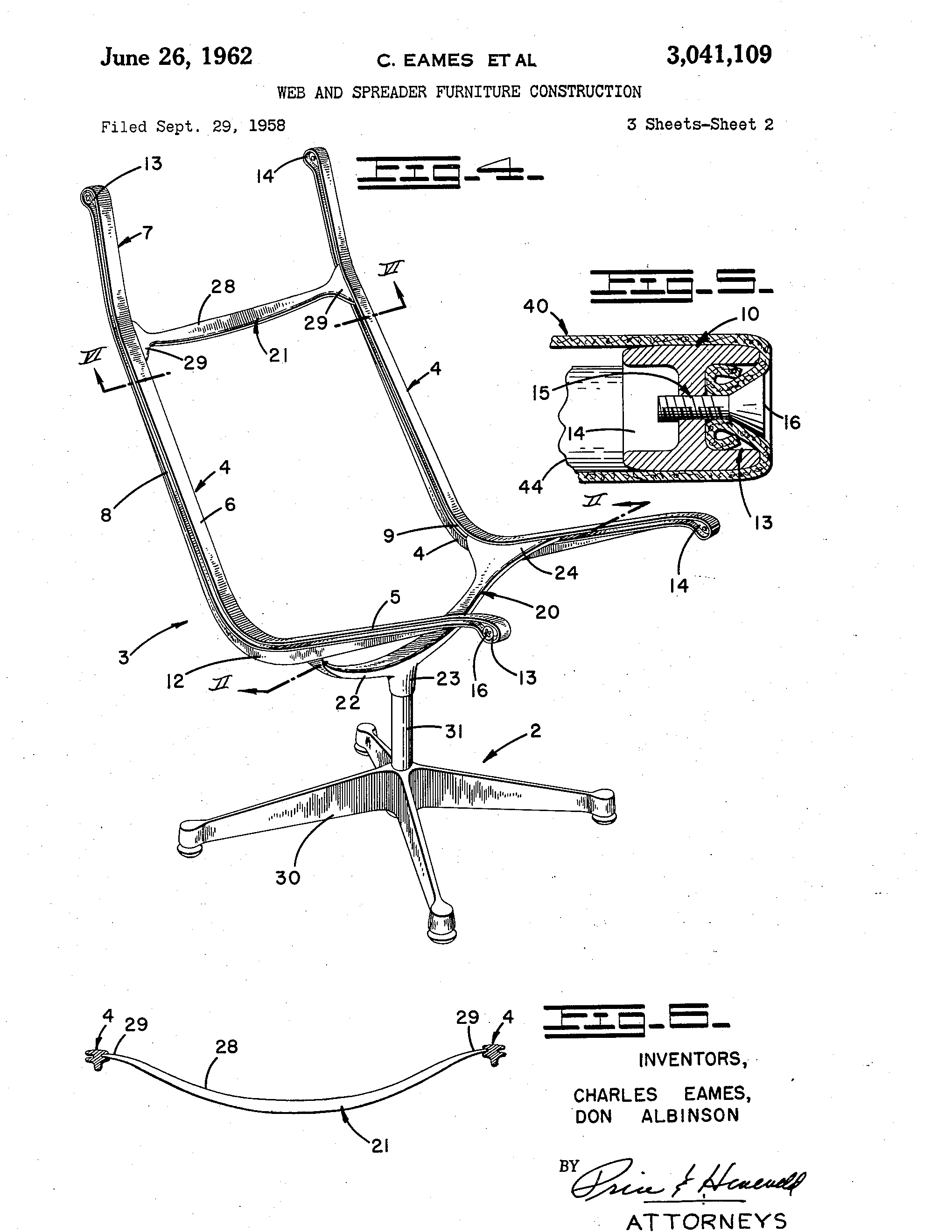
Patent drawing for an Eames Aluminum Group chair designed by Charles and Ray Eames, and Don Albinson (1958)

Referencing archival documents like old catalogues, engineering schemata, and patent drawings showing technical solutions and mechanisms, specific manufacturing methods, and innovative new functionalities, while employing "an encyclopedic point of reference" and detailed taxonomic hierarchies of individual traits, the book presents exhaustive diagrams of each example, methodically categorised by section (e.g., armrest, base, stem) in order to identify and catalogue characteristics and variations such as height, articulation, material, as well as objective phylotypic observations about structural and aesthetic considerations.

The work began as an in-house research project initially commissioned by Benjamin Pardo, Olivares's predecessor as design director of Knoll. After over four years of in-depth research and study, it evolved into its final form and was published by Phaidon Press in May 2011. In the book's foreword, Pardo notes that it "covers ground that has never before been documented in a systematic way. The taxonomic approach provides neutral, independent information without judgements, aesthetic or otherwise."

== Reception and influence ==
Writing for the New York Times, design critic Alice Rawsthorn noted that Olivares's "unusually thoughtful and rigorous" taxonomic method of approaching the subject "distinguishes his book from the usual run of image-heavy, fact-lite coffee table-crushing design tomes." She went on to say, "You'll never look at an office chair in quite the same way again." In a similar vein, Metropolis described it as "an invaluable reference work for industrial-design buffs and a rejection of the coffee-table-book format all too common in the industry."

Prospect magazine called the book an "Origin of Species for Aeron freaks" and compared it to Alain de Botton's The Pleasures and Sorrows of Work – ultimately dismissing it as "the kind of repetitive, extravagantly pointless task with which the corporate world has made us all familiar".

A Taxonomy of Office Chairs was shortlisted for the 2012 Diagram Prize, an annual literary award given to a book with an odd or unusual title.

Ten years after publication of the original book, Olivares released a small companion work called A Taxonomy of Office Chairs: Outtakes, Scraps and Updates. This corollary compendium, itself an evolution of post-Linnaean office chair taxonomy, looks at the research processes and techniques that were applied to making the initial work, adds updated material relevant to developments of the intervening decade, and shares personal points of view that were not suitable in the context of the original work. In the author's words, the addendum is intended as "a subjective scrapbook that is more in line with how I look at things today."

== Key examples ==
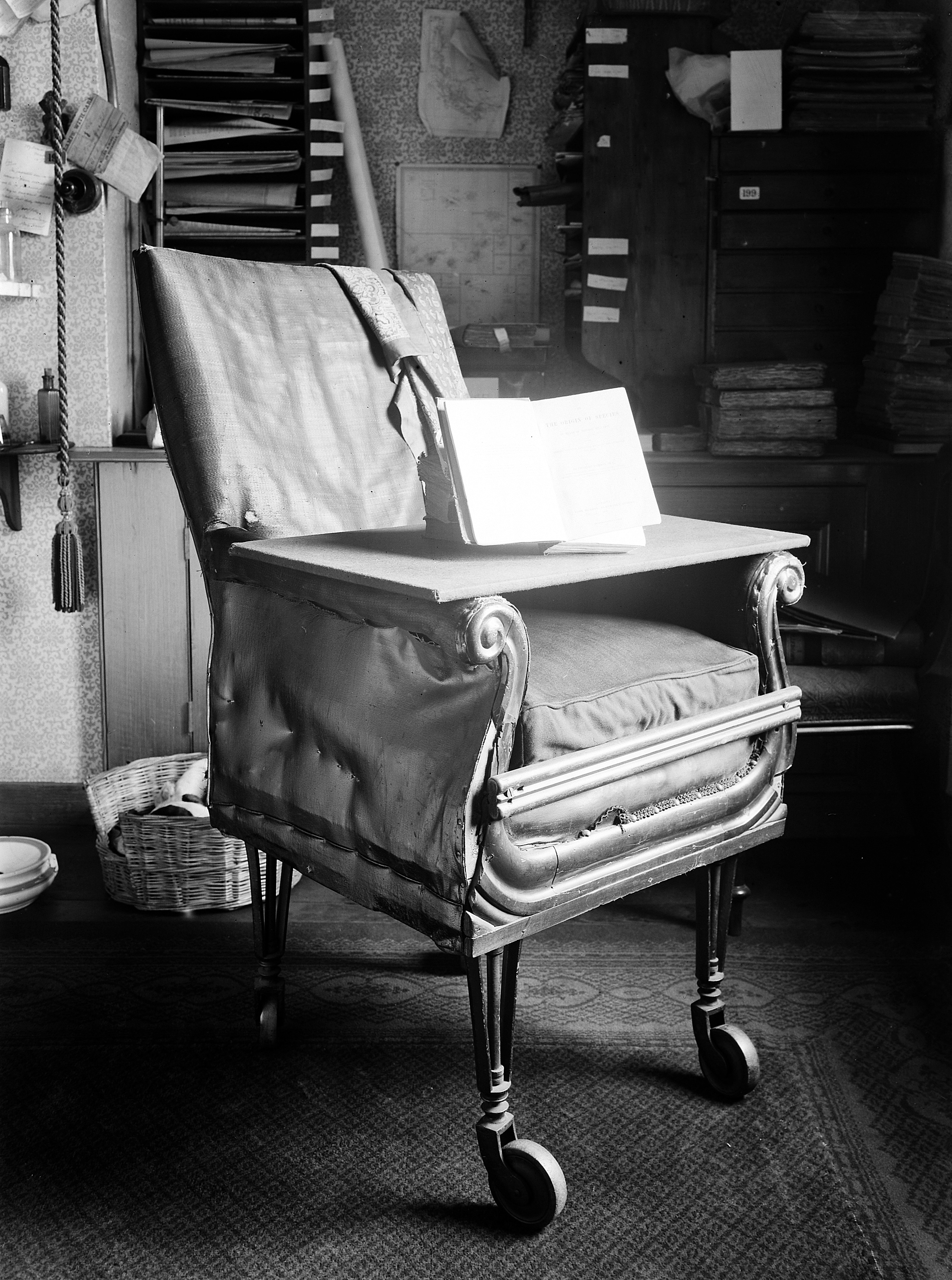
Charles Darwin's original bespoke, wheeled adaption of a William IV style Bergère armchair, Down House, Kent (c. 1835)

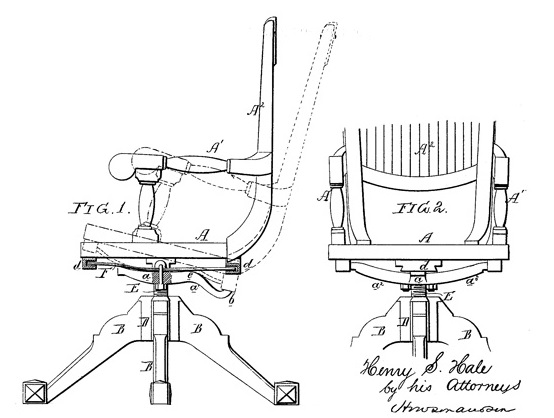
Drawing sheet details from US patent No. 168,482 for "improvements in chairs with tilting seats" issued to Henry S. Hale (1875)

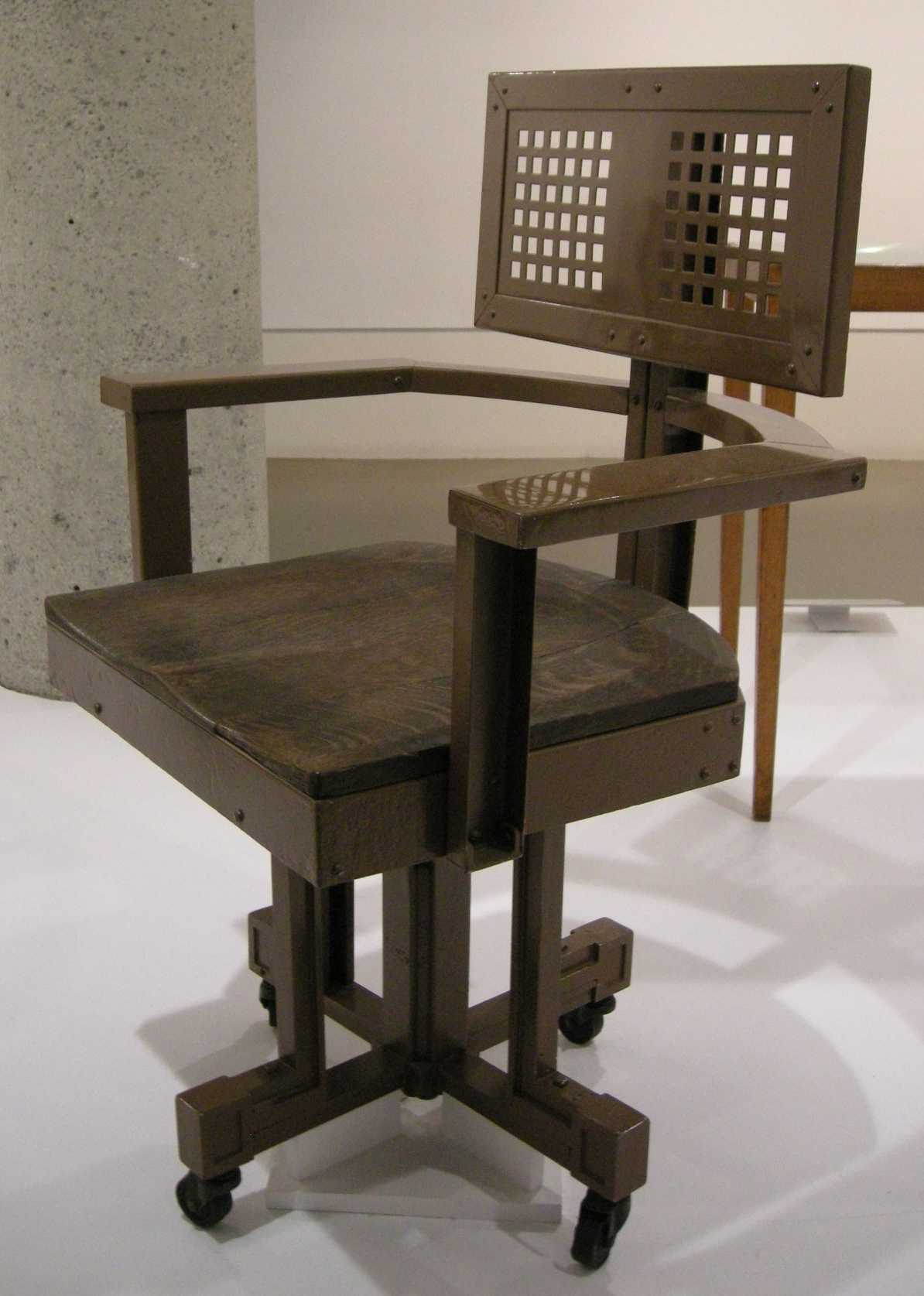
Chair for the Larkin Administration Building designed by Frank Lloyd Wright (1904)

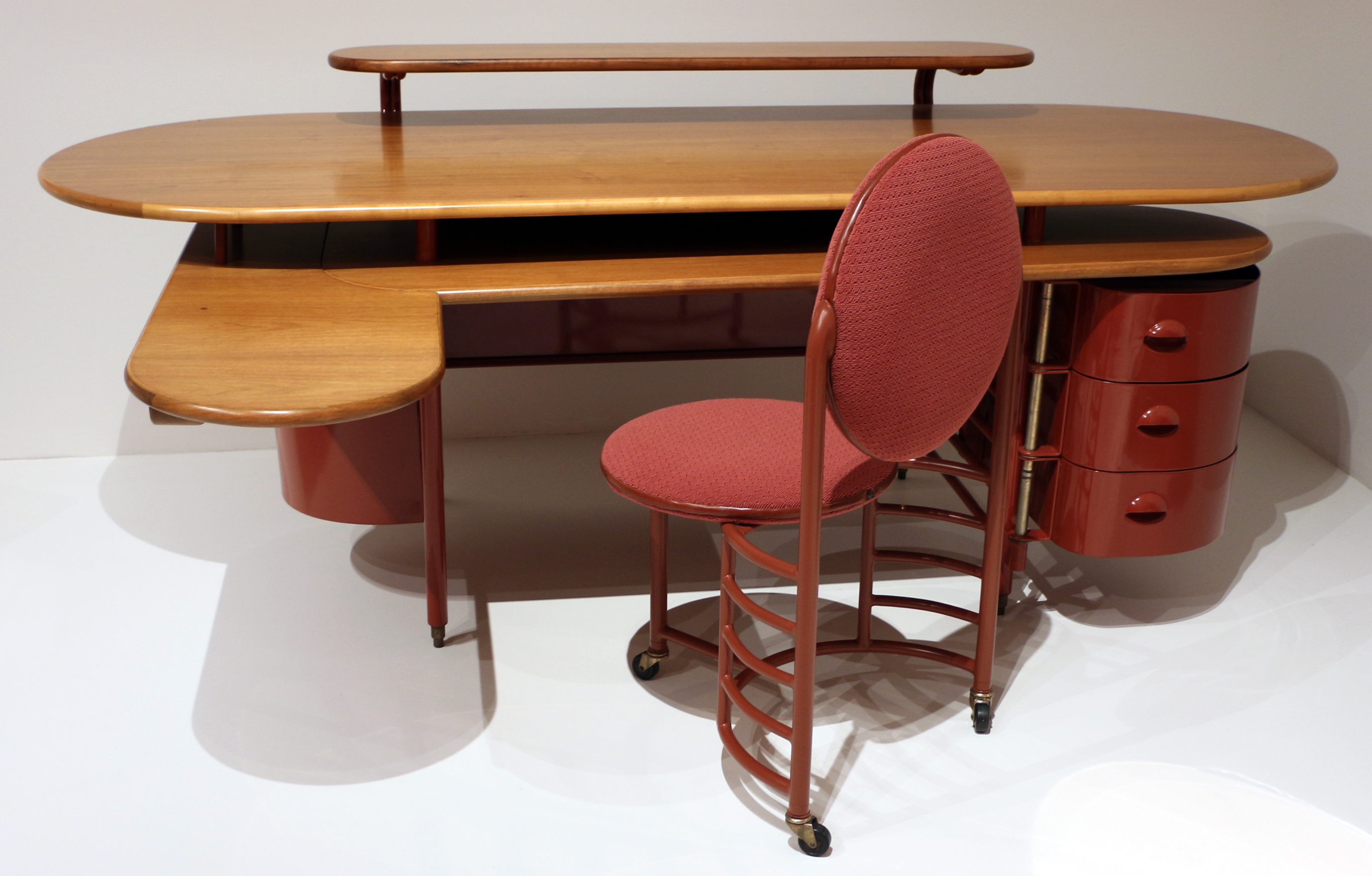
Integrated desk and chair set for the Johnson Wax Building designed by Frank Lloyd Wright (1936)

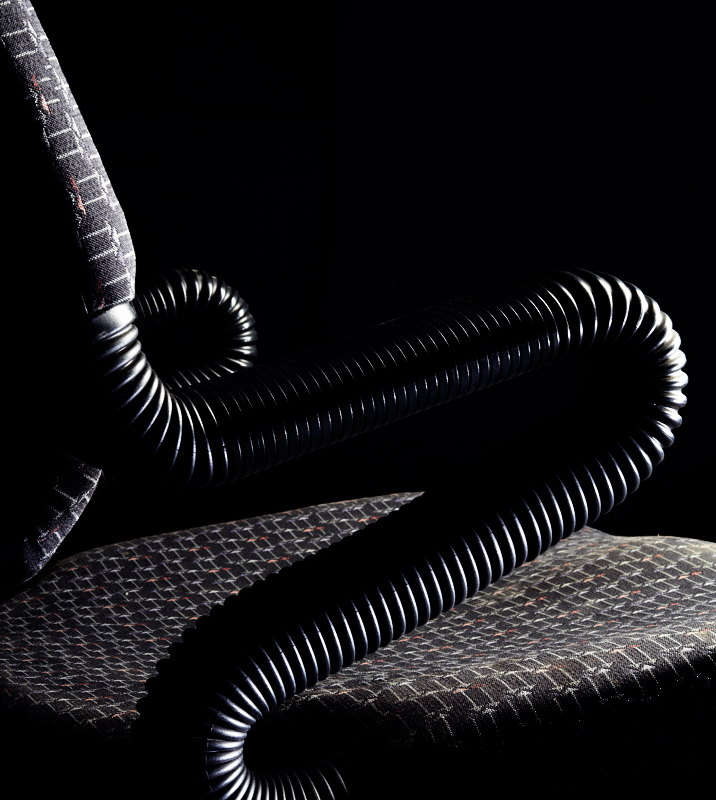
Armrest detail of a Vertebra chair designed by Emilio Ambasz and Giancarlo Piretti for Anonima Castelli (1975)

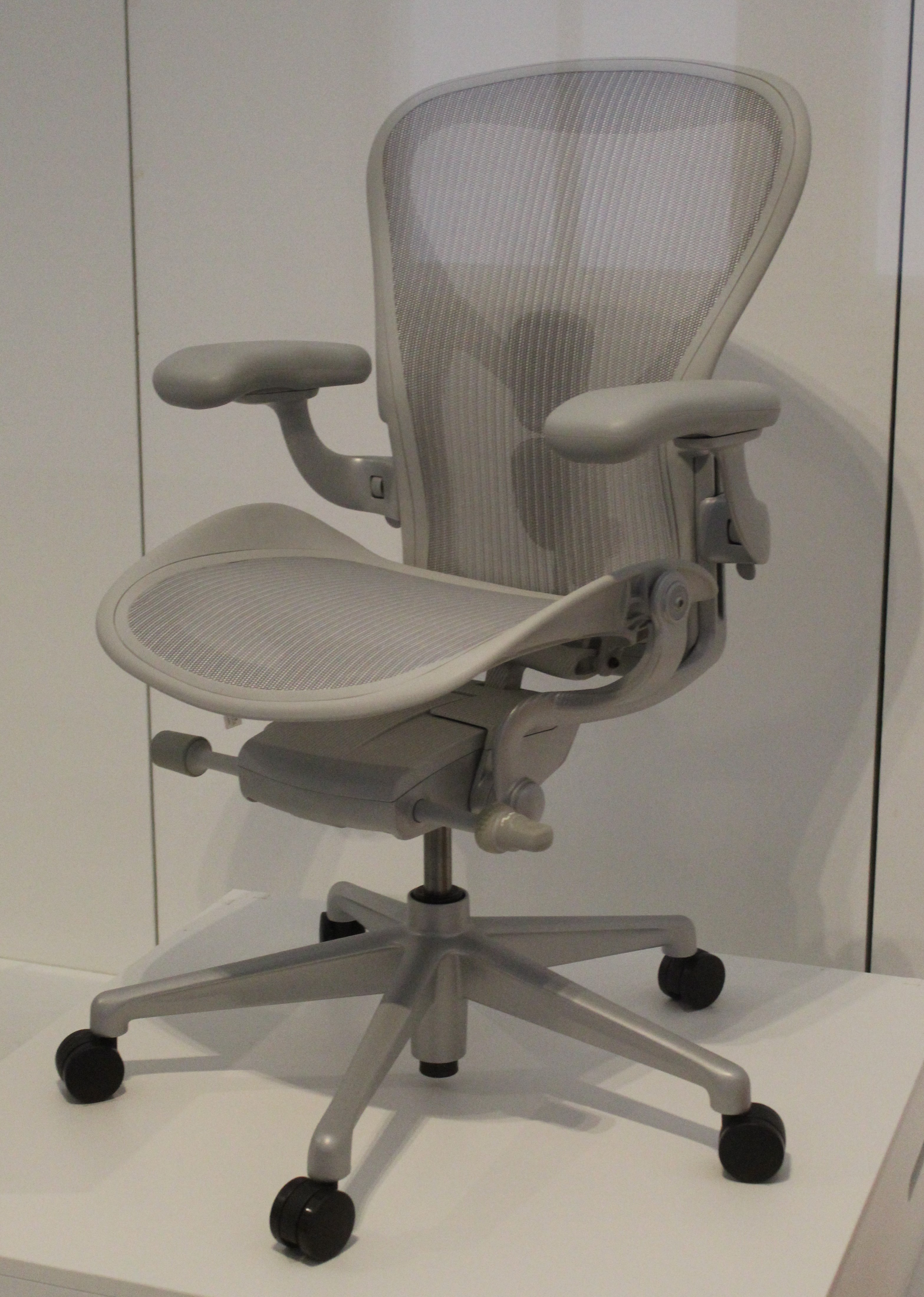
Aeron chair prototype incorporating Herman Miller's "Live OS" technology (c. 2017), a further evolution of the original design by Don Chadwick and Bill Stumpf (1992)

== See also ==
- Ergonomics – Designing systems to suit their users
- Gaming chair
- Office chair
- Swivel chair
- List of chairs
