= QOR360 =

Ergonomic chair brand

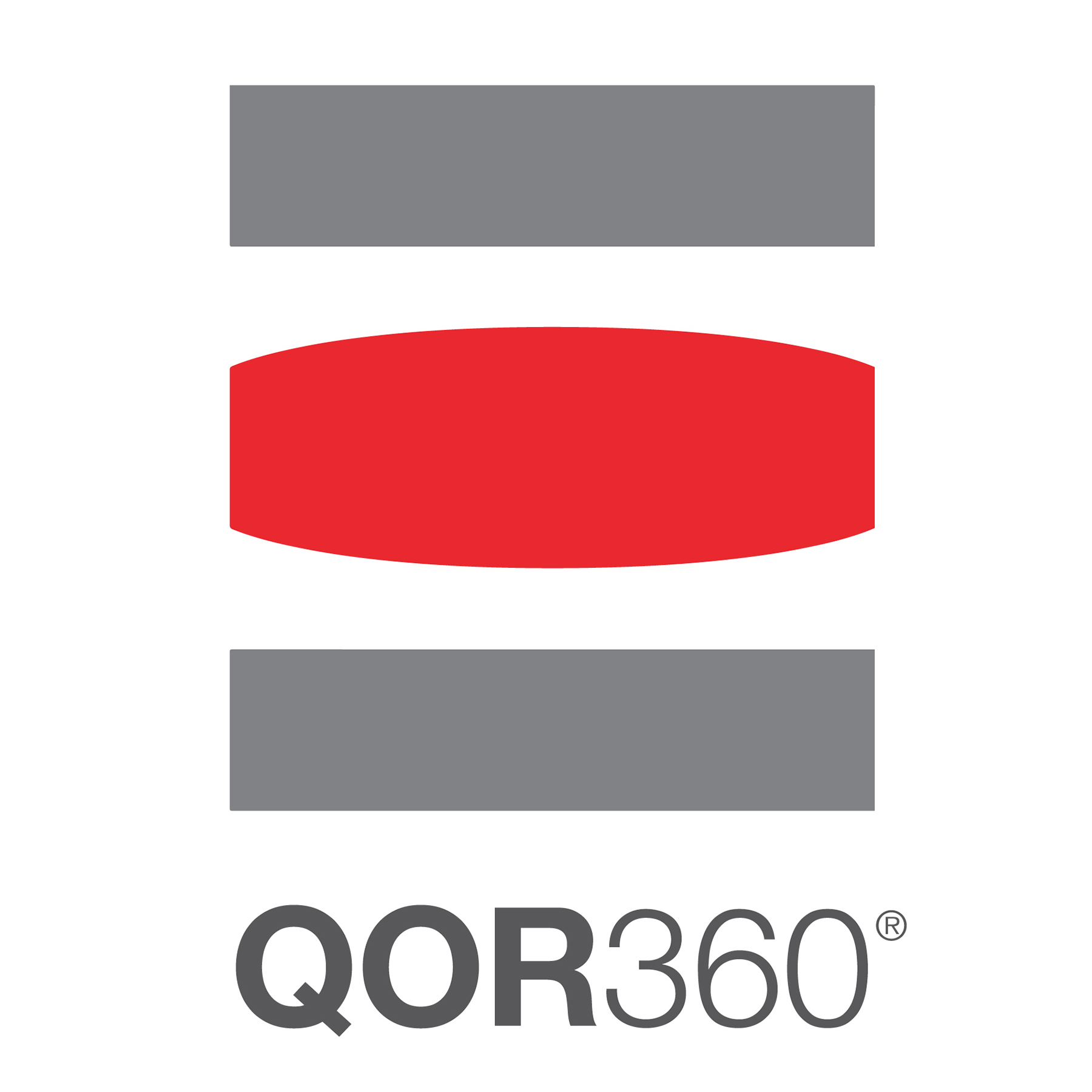
- Company type: Private
- Industry: Furniture
- Founder: Turner Osler, Lex Osler
- Headquarters: Burlington, VT, U.S.
- Website: qor360.com

QOR360 (pronounced ‘core 360’) is a line of ergonomic chairs developed by Turner Osler, a trauma surgeon.

== History ==
Osler stated he developed the design after transitioning to a desk job after 30 years in the operating room as a trauma surgeon. In his role as a research epidemiologist, Osler spent up to 60 hours a week sitting and claimed to develop back pain as a result. Osler said he conceived his own design after he was unable to find an affordable ergonomic chair. Along with his son, Lex, Osler founded QOR360 in 2016. In 2022 the Financial Times reported that the increase in working from home during the COVID-19 pandemic resulted increased sales of the chairs.

== Product ==
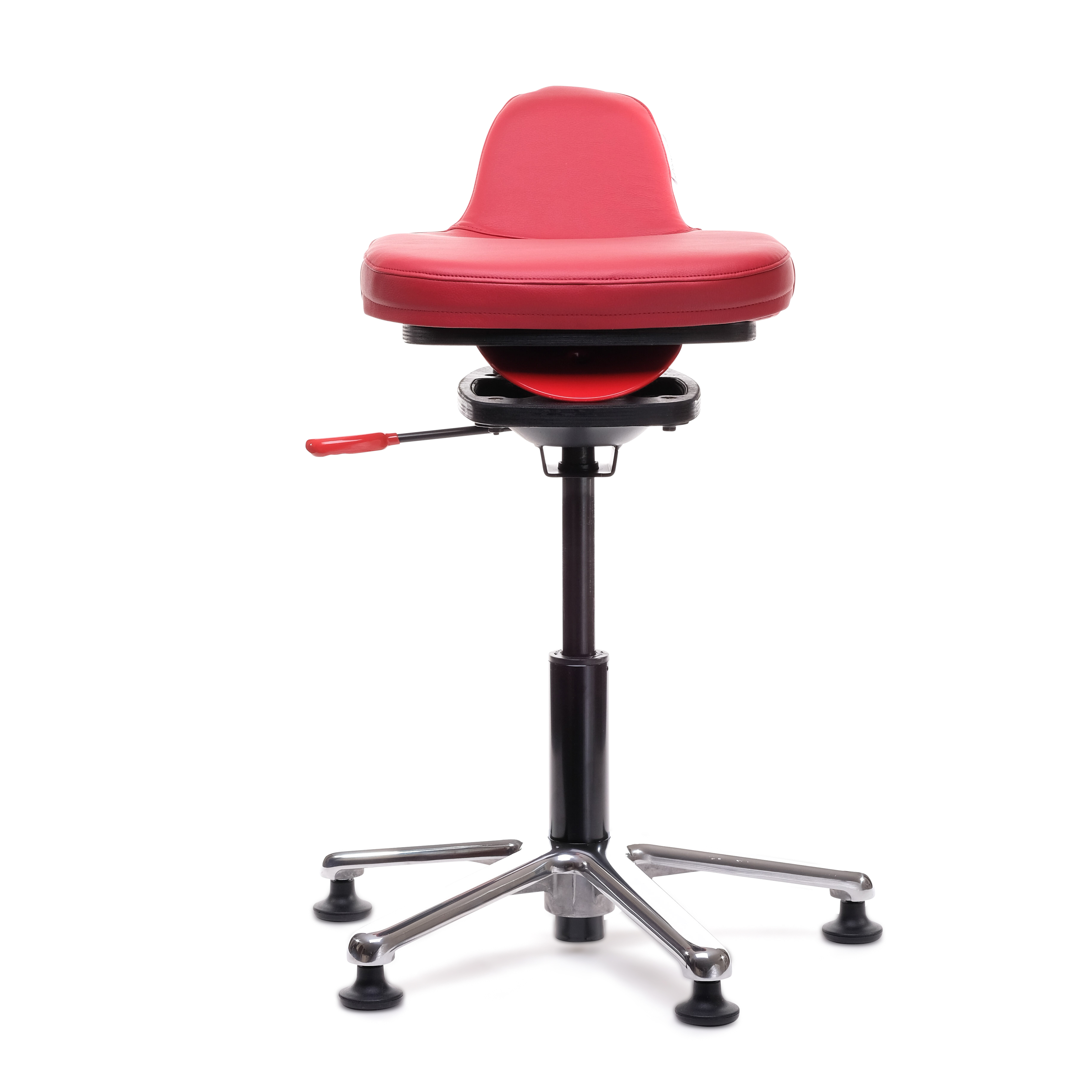
QOR360 Red Leather Ariel 1.0 Active Chair

The chairs are designed around a feature Osler patented as RedRocker technology; a dome-shaped rubber piece beneath the seat that allows it to wobble and pivot. Each model of chair resembles a stool. The chair’s design requires the sitter to keep both feet on the ground and places the knees below the hips. The chair can rock in all directions.

In 2022 QOR360 designed a chair called the ButtOn that "looks like a basic wooden stool, but its button-shaped seat is resting on a tennis ball centered below." This model can be constructed using free, downloadable plans.

== See also ==
- Office chair
- List of chairs
- Open-design movement
