= Swivel chair =

Rotating chair

A swivel chair with a pump to raise and lower the seat

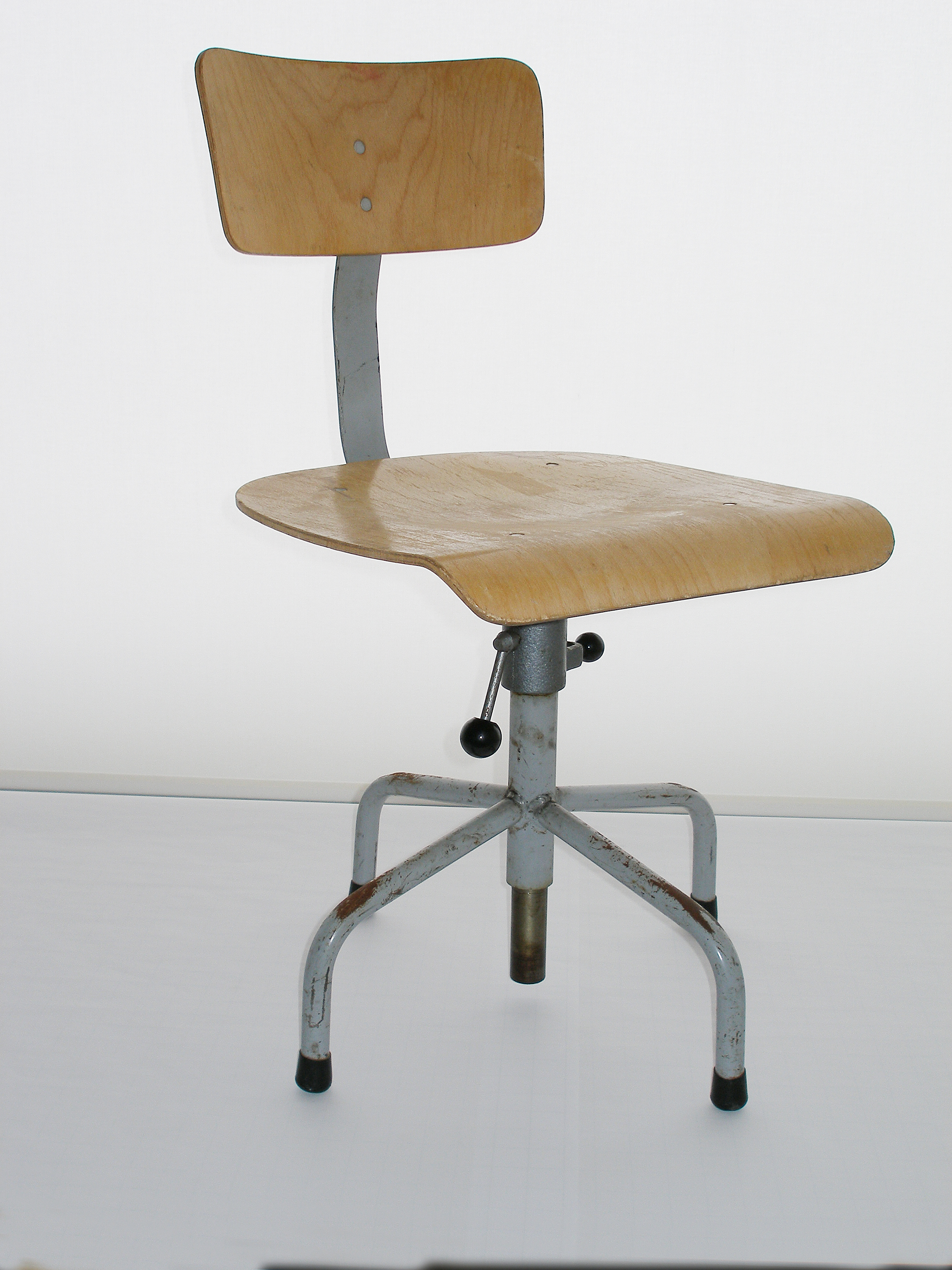
Bi-Regulette chair made by Interstuhl Büromöbel provides height adjustment and rotation controls (archetypical 1962 design)

A swivel, swivelling, spinny, or revolving chair is a chair with a single central leg that allows the seat to rotate 360 degrees to the left or right. A concept of a rotating chair with swivel castors was illustrated by the Nuremberg noble Martin Löffelholz von Kolberg in his 1505 technological illuminated manuscript, the so-called Codex Löffelholz, on folio 10r. It is purported that Thomas Jefferson drafted the United States Declaration of Independence in 1776 while sitting on a swivel chair of his own design.

== Types and examples ==
Swivel chairs may have wheels on the base allowing the user to move the chair around their work area without getting up. This type is common in modern offices and are often also referred to as office chairs. Office swivel chairs, like computer chairs, usually incorporate a gas lift to adjust the height of the seat, but not usually large (e.g. recliner) swiveling armchairs.

A draughtsman's chair is a swivel chair without wheels that is usually taller than an 'office chair' for use in front of a drawing board. They also have a foot-ring to support the legs when it is not possible to reach the ground.

== Swivel seat ==
When the swivel chair is installed in an aircraft, an automobile or on a stair lift and can not move independently because it is on a fixed base, it is rather called a swivel seat. Some swivel seats are also bucket seats.

== Origin ==
An earlier prototype of a swivel chair dates back to a 1505 illustrated manuscript from a German noble named Martin Löffelholz von Kolberg. He conceived of a chair that could twist on its legs and adjust its height.

Using an English-style Windsor chair, possibly made by and purchased from Francis Trumble or Philadelphia cabinet-maker Benjamin Randolph, Thomas Jefferson constructed an early swivel chair in 1775. Jefferson heavily modified the Windsor chair and incorporated top and bottom parts connected by a central iron spindle, enabling the top half, known as the seat, to swivel on casters of the type used in rope-hung windows. It had no wheels. When the Second Continental Congress met in Philadelphia, Jefferson's swivel chair is purported to be the chair he sat upon when he drafted the United States Declaration of Independence in 1776. Jefferson later had the swivel chair sent to his Virginia plantation, Monticello, where he built a "writing paddle" onto its side in August 1791.

Since 1836, Jefferson's chair has been in the possession of the American Philosophical Society located in Philadelphia. (Note: See American Philosophical Society museum web site photographs of Jefferson's swivel Windsor chair.)

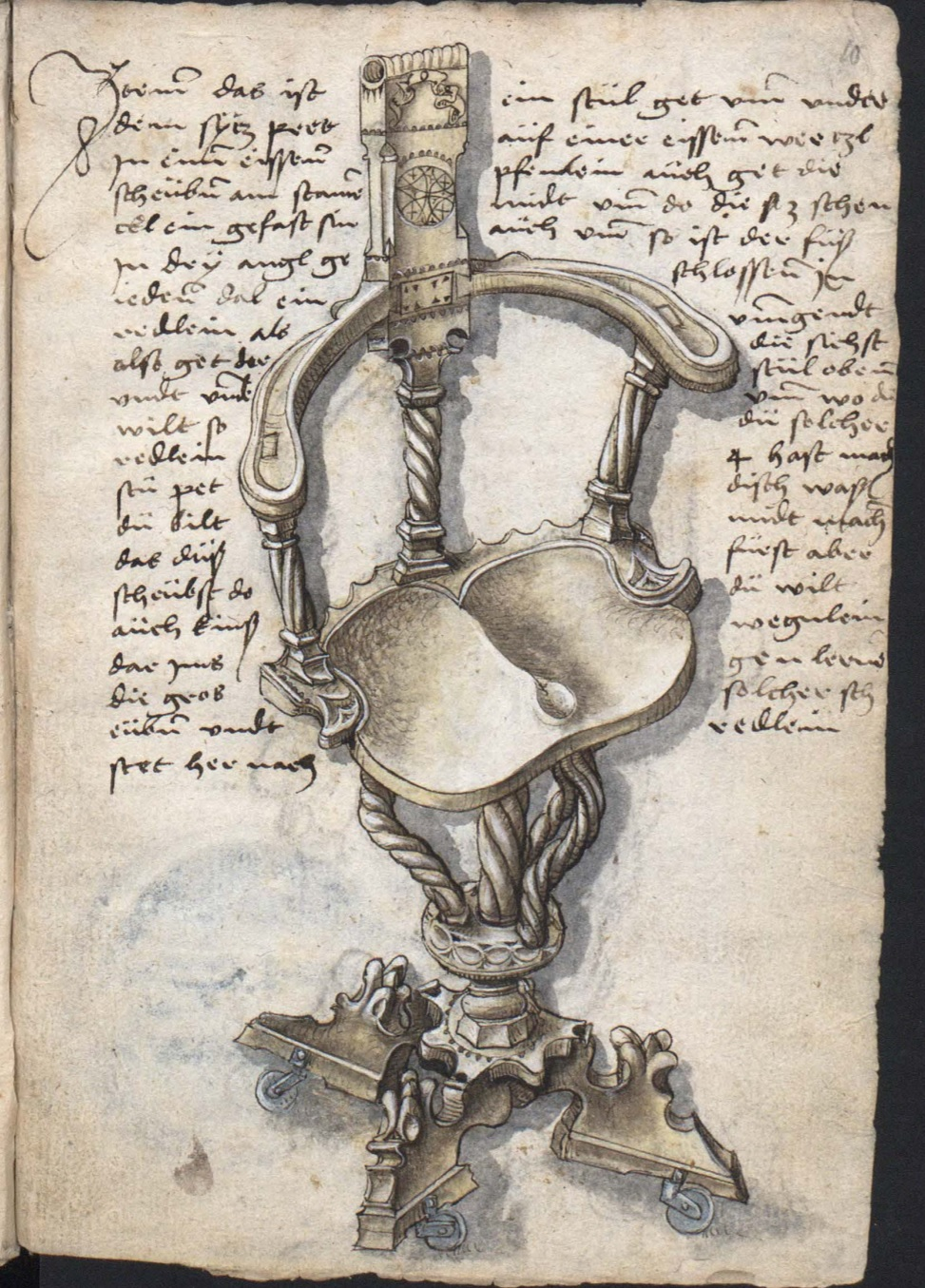
Concept of a rotating chair with swivel wheels from Löffelholz-codex from Nuremberg, Germany, dated 1505

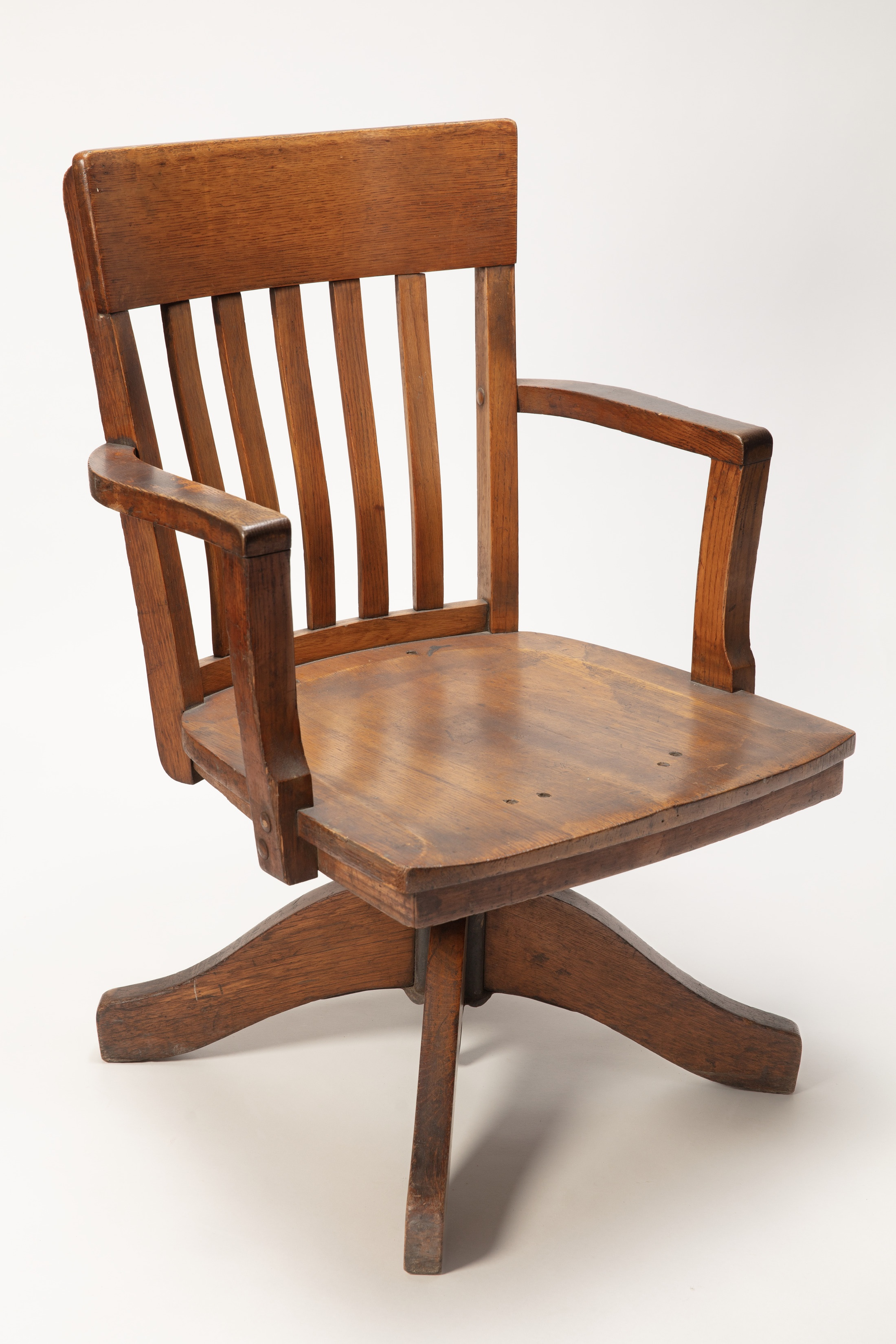
Desk chair with swivel and tilt mechanism made by the Conrades Manufacturing Company, Saint Louis, US

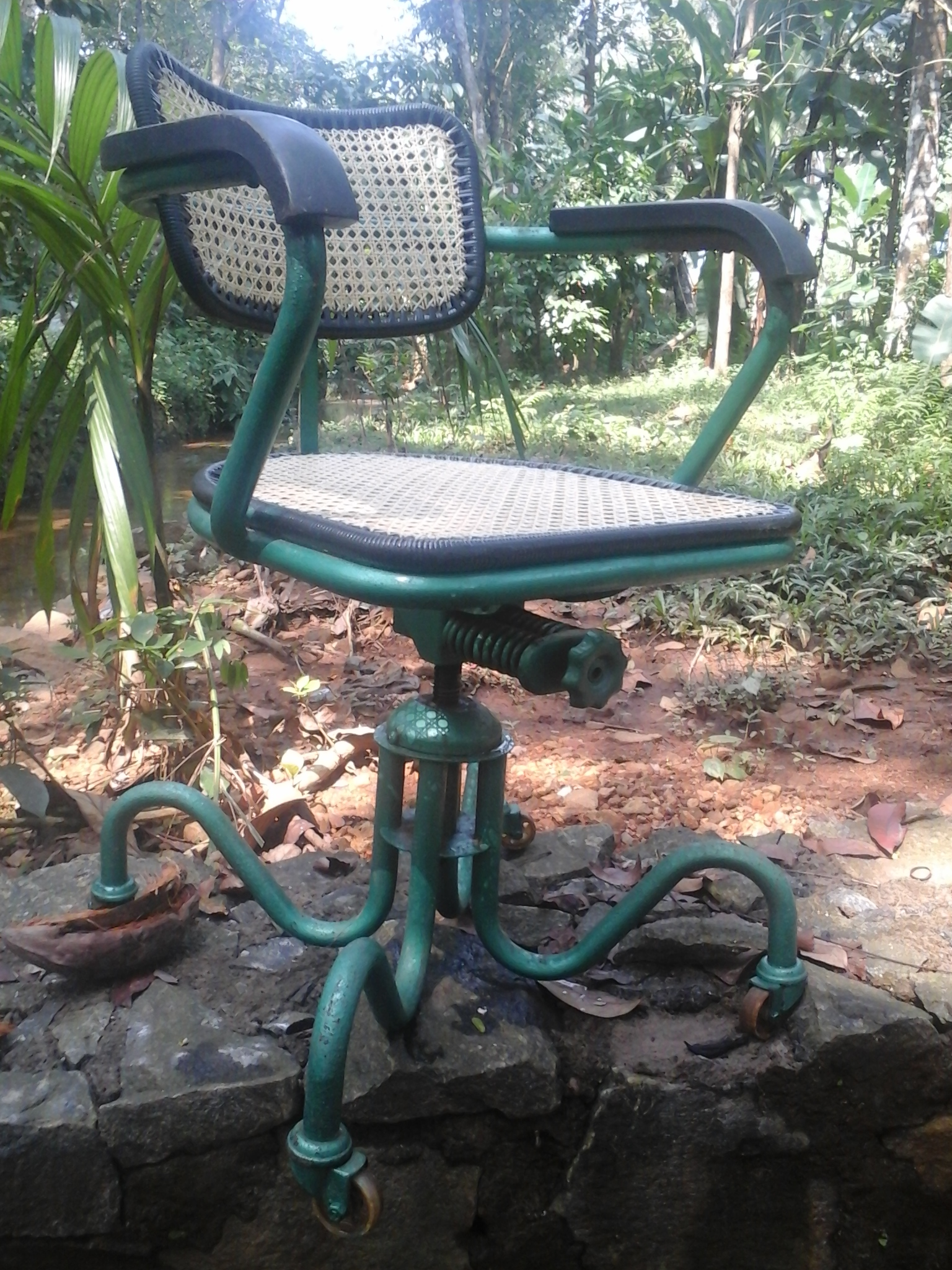
An old swivel chair

== See also ==
- A Taxonomy of Office Chairs
- Armrest
- Bárány chair
- Barber chair, another type of rotating chair
- Folding seat
- Gaming chair
- Office chair
