= Bill Stumpf =

American furniture designer

William Eugene Stumpf (March 1, 1936 – August 30, 2006) was an American furniture designer noted for his detailed ergonomic study of seating, especially in the office environment, and his development of scientific criteria for chair design, including that a chair needed to support the body in a wide variety of positions from sitting upright to reclining, slouching or leaning forward.

Stumpf would go on to co-design the Embody, Ergon and Aeron, chairs for Herman Miller, the latter becoming the most-produced office chair globally. In a 1999 interview with Ideas Magazine, Strump noted that he's less concerned with "haute design", but rather, what he calls “the genial middle ground of everyday experience.”

== Background ==
Stumpf was born in St. Louis, Missouri. His father died when he was 13, and his mother, a gerontology nurse, relocated the family to Winona, Minnesota, to be near her family.

He served in the U.S. Navy and then earned a bachelor's in industrial design from the University of Illinois at Urbana-Champaign, and a master's in environmental design from the University of Wisconsin–Madison.

Stumpf died at age 70 in 2006, from abdominal surgery complications. He was married to Sharon Stumpf, with whom he had two children, Jon Stumpf and Carol Stumpf and five grandchildren: Gabriella, Erin, Max, David and Julia.

== Career ==
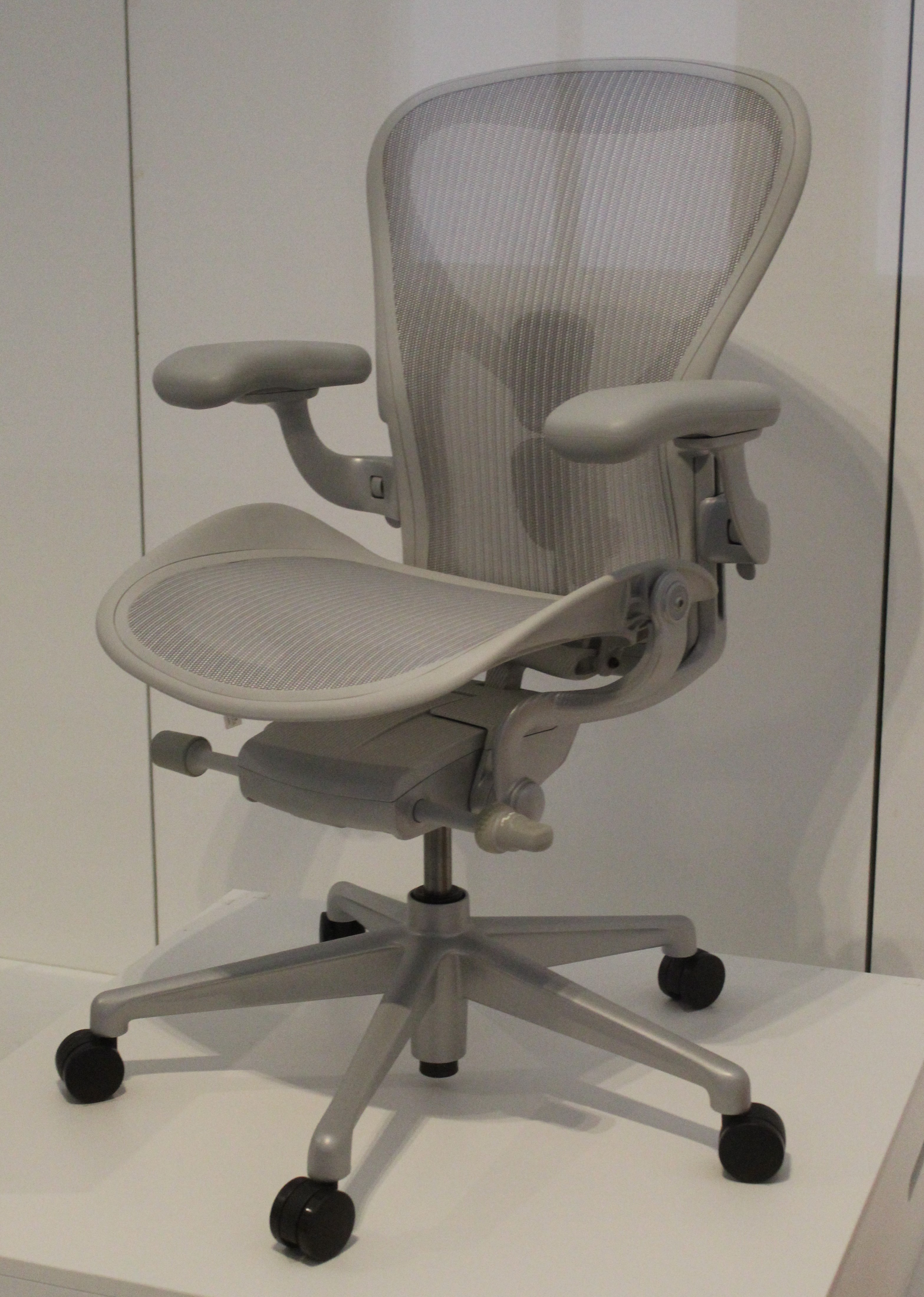
Aeron chair prototype, Victoria and Albert Museum

At the University of Wisconsin-Madison Stumpf worked with specialists in orthopedic and vascular medicine, conducted extensive research into ergonomics, specifically in the way people sit. In 1974, Herman Miller commissioned him to apply his research to office seating. Two years later, the Ergon chair was introduced. The company has said that Stumpf had a direct and indirect influence on each of its chair designs since 1976.

Stumpf's association with Herman Miller began in 1970 when he joined the staff of the Herman Miller Research Corporation. After establishing his own firm in 1972, Stumpf created the Ergon chair, the first ergonomic work chair. Later, in collaboration with Don Chadwick, he designed the Equa and Aeron chairs, the latter of which is in the collection of the Museum of Modern Art and was included in Pirouette: Turning Points in Design, an exhibition featuring "widely recognized design icons [...] highlighting pivotal moments in design history." He was also the principal designer for the Ethospace system.

== Awards ==
In addition winner of the 2006 National Design Award in Product Design, which Stumpf received posthumously from the Smithsonian's Cooper-Hewitt, National Design Museum, he has received numerous other awards:Awards / Recognition:

- Best of NeoCon Silver, Ergonomic Desk/Task Seating, for Embody, 2009
- Time magazine, Design: Best of the Decade for Equa chair, 1990
- IBD Gold Award for Ethospace interiors, 1985
- IBD Gold Award for Equa chair, 1984
- ID magazine "Designer of the 70s," 1979
- ASID Award for Ergon seating, 1976

== Publications ==
- Friedman, Mildred, Ed. A Serious Chair — Design Quarterly 126. Minneapolis and Cambridge: The Walker Art Center and Massachusetts Institute of Technology, 1984. ISSN 0011-9415
- Stumpf, William. Ice Palace That Melted Away: How Good Design Enhances Our Lives. New York: Pantheon Books, 1998. ISBN 0375402217
- Amy Auscherman, Sam Gawe, Leon Ransmeier, eds. "Ergon Chairs 1976" in Herman Miller A Way of Living. London: Phaidon Press, 2019. 430–487 ISBN 9780714875217
- Olivares, Jonathan (2011). A Taxonomy of Office Chairs: The evolution of the office chair, demonstrated through a catalogue of seminal models and an illustrated taxonomy of their components. Foreword by Benjamin Pardo. London, UK; New York, NY: Phaidon Press. ISBN 978-0-7148-6103-6.
