= Chadwick modular seating =

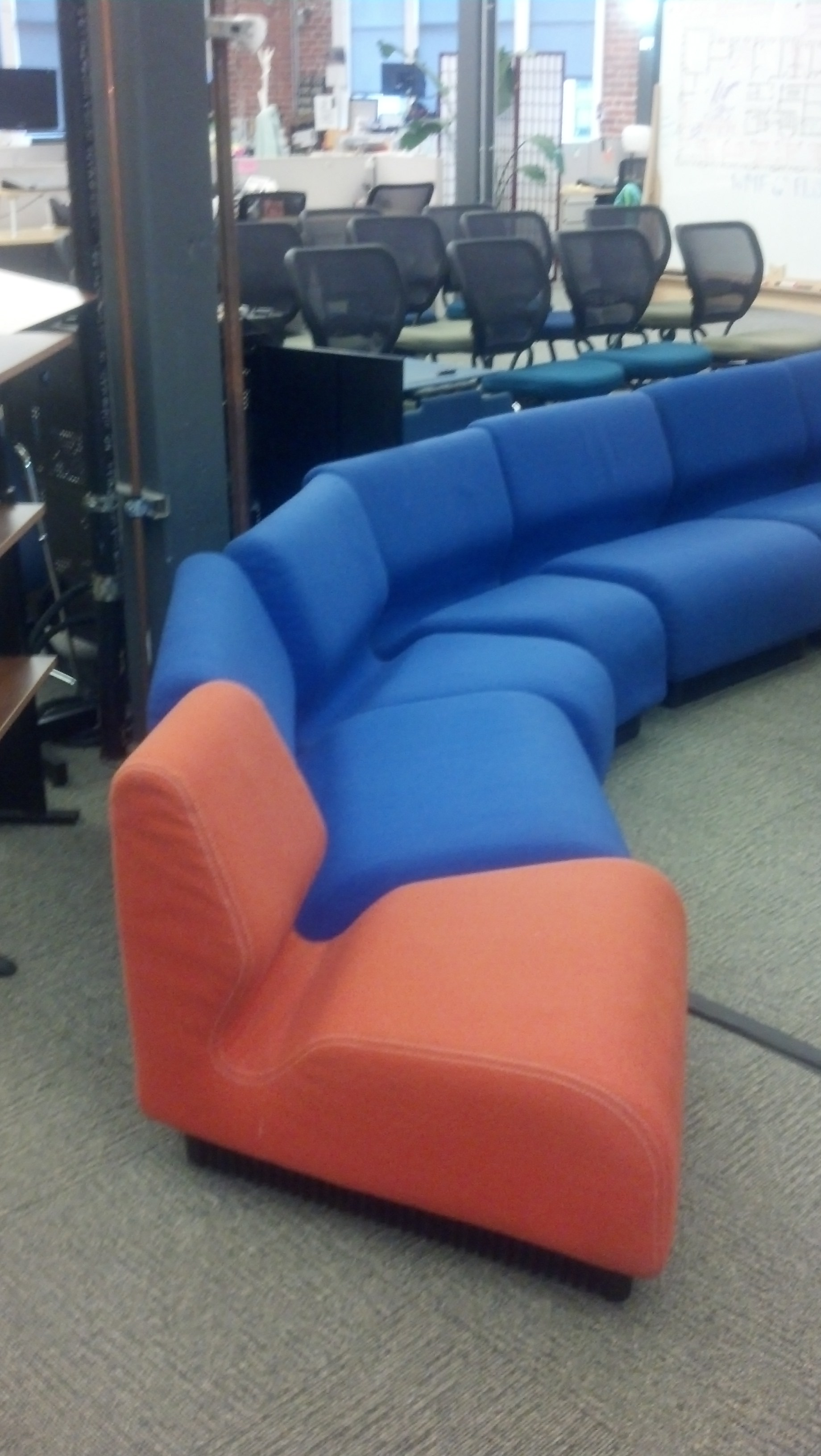
Modular sofa system designed by Don Chadwick and produced by Herman Miller.

Chadwick Modular Seating is a modular sofa composed of one or more sections that can be arranged to create long, contiguous seating surfaces for offices and homes. Multiple-section shapes were produced in many fabrics and colors. Sections were available in straight, wedge, and elbow shapes.

Don Chadwick designed the system in 1974 for Herman Miller.

== See also ==
- Harvey Probber#Modular seating
