= Centripetal Spring Armchair =

19th-century American office chair

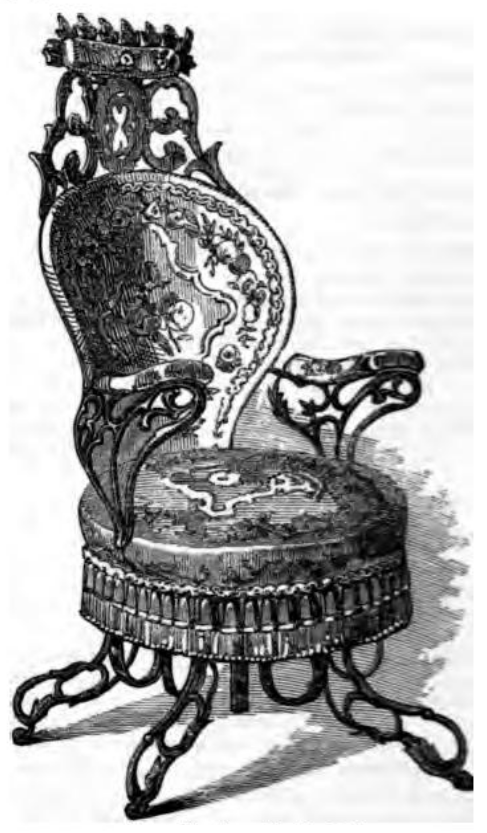
The armchair as depicted in the 1851 Great Exhibition catalogue

The Centripetal Spring Chair or Armchair was a 19th-century American office chair, and one of the first modern designs for office chairs.

Designed in 1849 by the American inventor Thomas E. Warren (b. 1808), the chair was produced by the American Chair Company in Troy, New York. Made of cast iron and varnished steel with wood and velvet upholstery, it measured 107 × 61 × 71 centimeters (42.1 x 24 x 28 in) with headrest and armrests, and had a seat height of 48 centimeters (18.9 in).

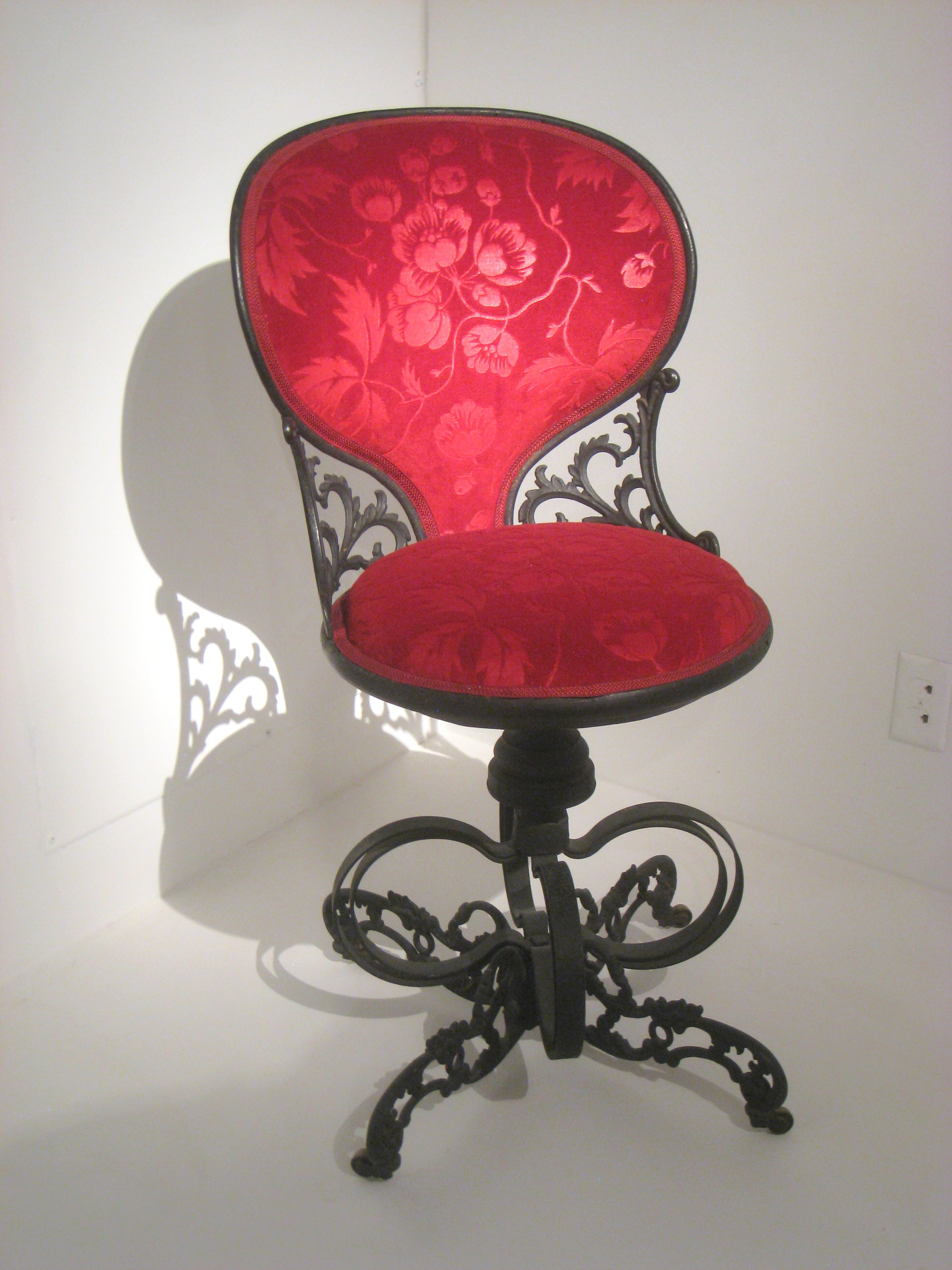
A Centripetal Spring Chair (the variant without arms and headrest) in the collection of the Wolfsonian-FIU Museum

The chair exhibited all features of today's office chairs except adjustable lumbar support: it allowed tilt movement in all directions and had a revolving seat, caster wheels for ease of movement, as well as a headrest and armrests in the armchair variant. The seat rested on four large flexible C-shaped steel springs which permitted tilting around a central fulcrum point just above the base, using the sitter's feet and the weight of the chair as a lever. The modernity of its design, which included an innovative use of cast iron for the frame, was visually downplayed by hiding the springs behind a dense passementerie (an elaborate trim) and by rendering the frame in the nostalgic, gilded Rococo Revival style.

After it was first presented at the 1851 Great Exhibition in London, the chair had little success outside the US: it was deemed immoral because it was too comfortable. The Victorian morality of the time valued rigid, unsupportive seats that allowed sitters to demonstrate refinement, willpower, and morality through an upright posture. Today, reflecting its place in the history of chair design, the chair is exhibited in design museums, including the Vitra Design Museum and the Brooklyn Museum.

== Bibliography ==
- Olivares, Jonathan (2011). A Taxonomy of Office Chairs. London: Phaidon Press. ISBN 978-0714861036.
- Shewchuk, Diane Mary (1993). Thomas E. Warren, the American Chair Company and the centripetal spring chair. OCLC 80464431.
