= Gas lift chair =

Type of office chair

A gas lift chair is a form of office chair that allows the user to modify their height in relation to the height of a desk, leading to an increase in comfort and ergonomic benefit.

A patent describing a common configuration of a gas lift cylinder by John Wang, published 20 May 1989.

== See also ==
- Lift chair
