= Eames Aluminum Group =

1958 chair design

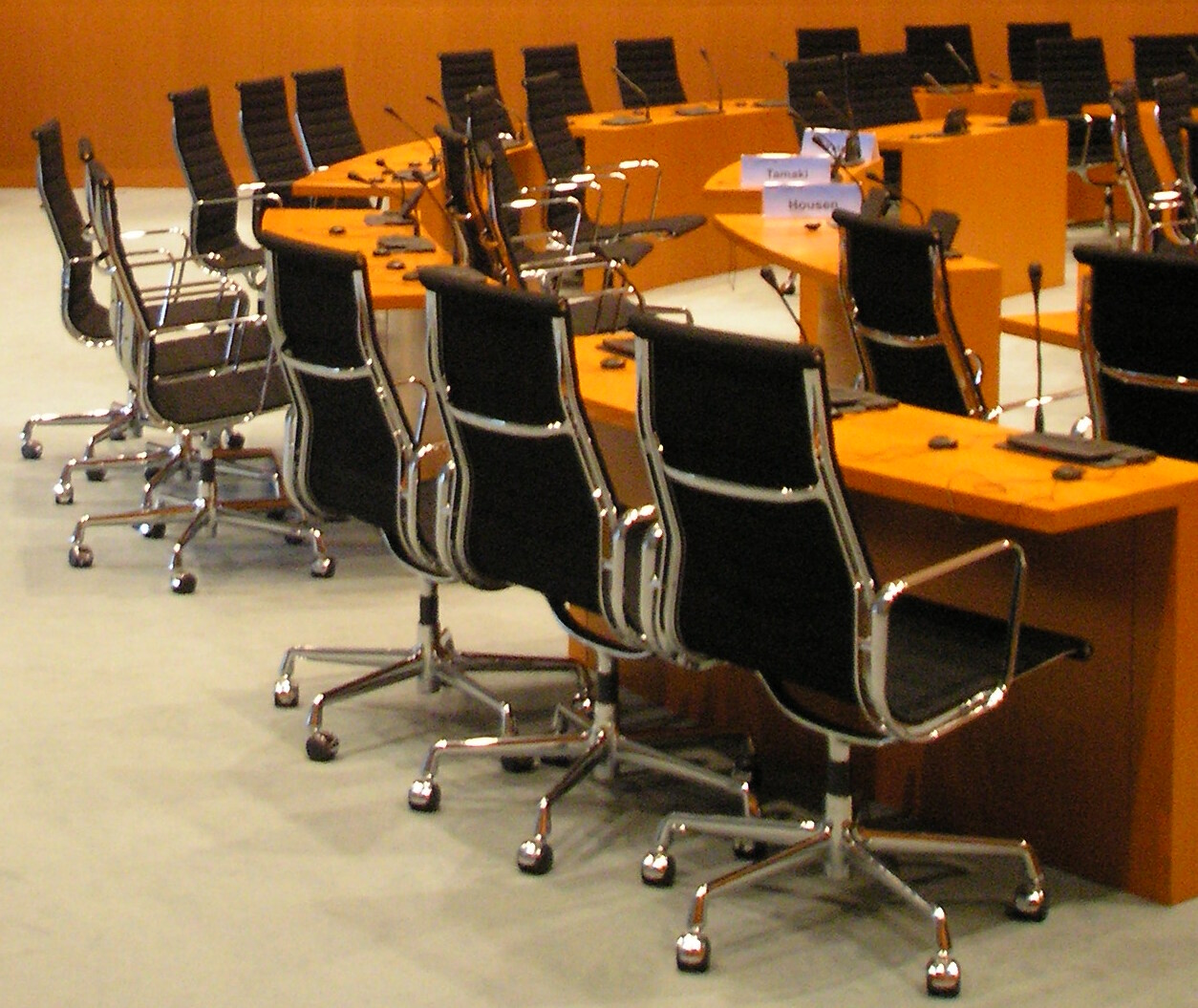
- Aluminum Group chairs, Federal Chancellery building, Berlin (2007)
- Designer: Charles Eames and Ray Eames of the Eames Office
- Date: 1958 – present
- Materials: Chrome-plated or powder-coated sand cast aluminum structure with fabric or leather upholstery
- Style / tradition: Mid-century modern
- Sold by: Herman Miller (United States); Vitra (Europe)
- Height: 845 cm
- Width: 560 cm
- Depth: 522 cm

The Eames Aluminum Group series is a line of furniture designed by Charles Eames, Ray Eames, and Don Albinson for Herman Miller in 1958. It is an "icon" of office furniture and a "high-status symbol of modern design".

== History ==
The chair was originally commissioned as outdoor seating for the Miller House, the home of longtime Cummins Engines president J. Irwin Miller, by Eero Saarinen and Alexander Girard. The original design featured a woven suspension back and seat stretched between aluminum ribs. The aluminum elements are produced by sand casting.

It was designed by Charles Eames, Ray Eames, and Don Albinson; Charles and Don patented the design and innovative construction. Robert Staples, an Eames Office employee, carved the eight wooden prototypes that were made during the development of the piece. Although it was originally called the "Indoor-Outdoor Group", the design did not succeed as outdoor furniture, and by 1959, Herman Miller had renamed it the Eames Aluminum Group.

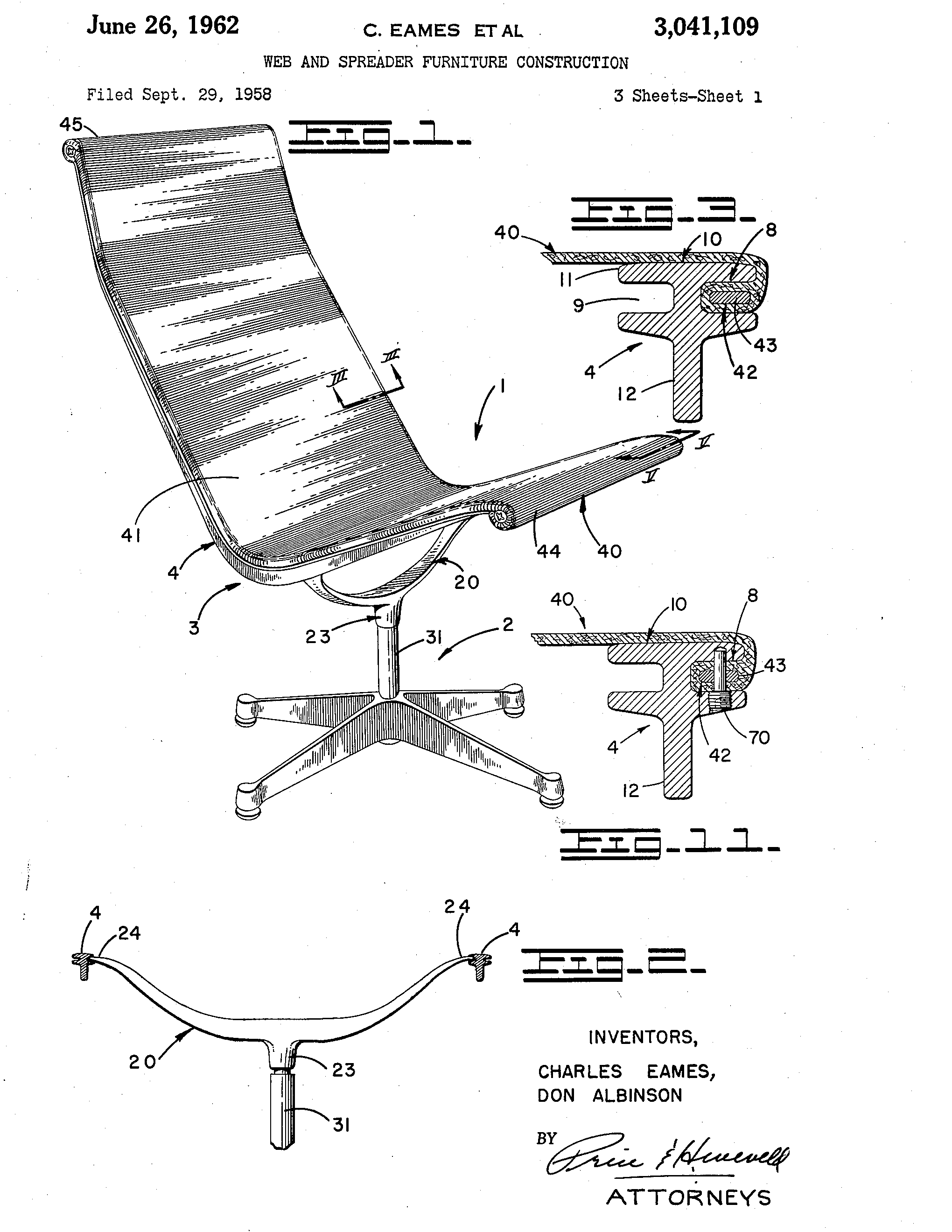
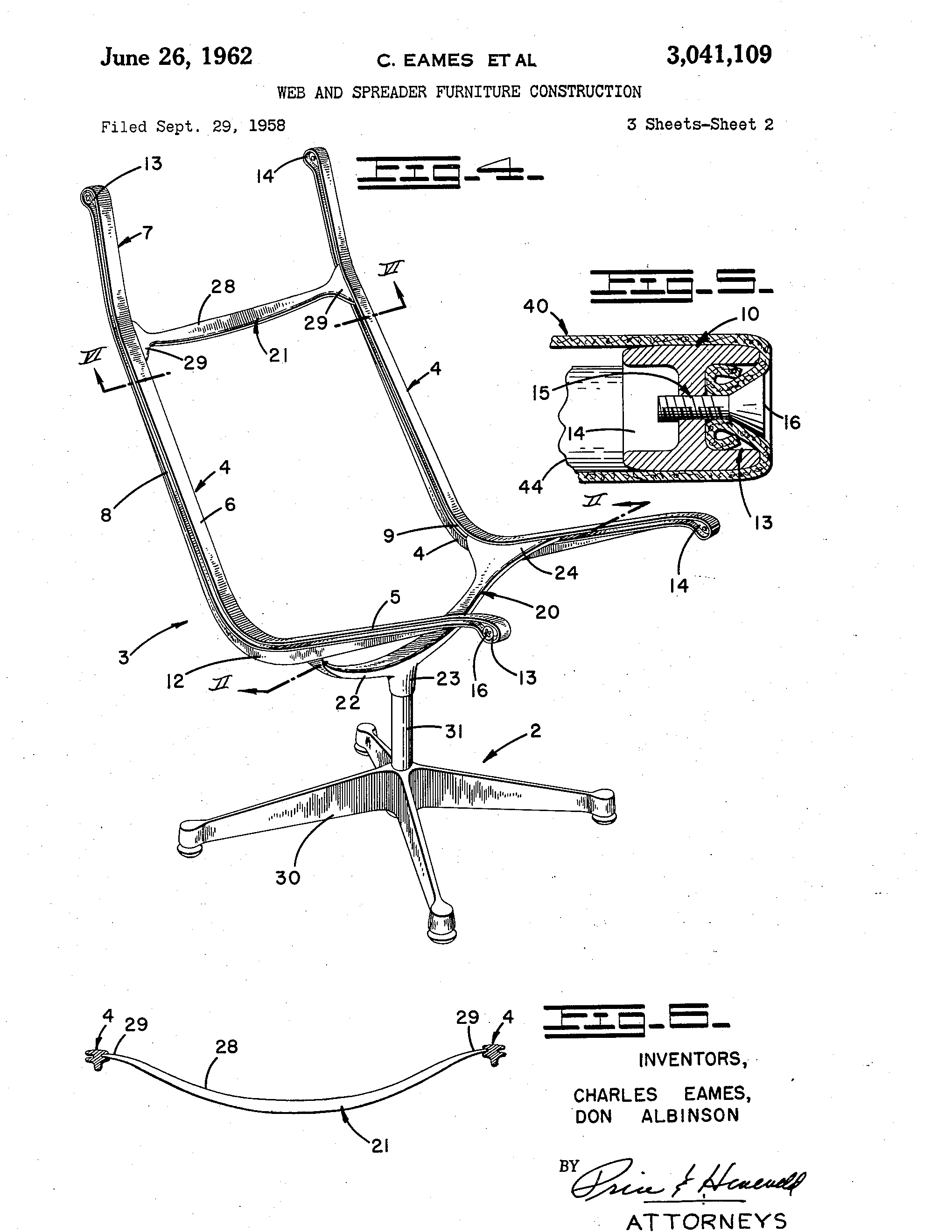
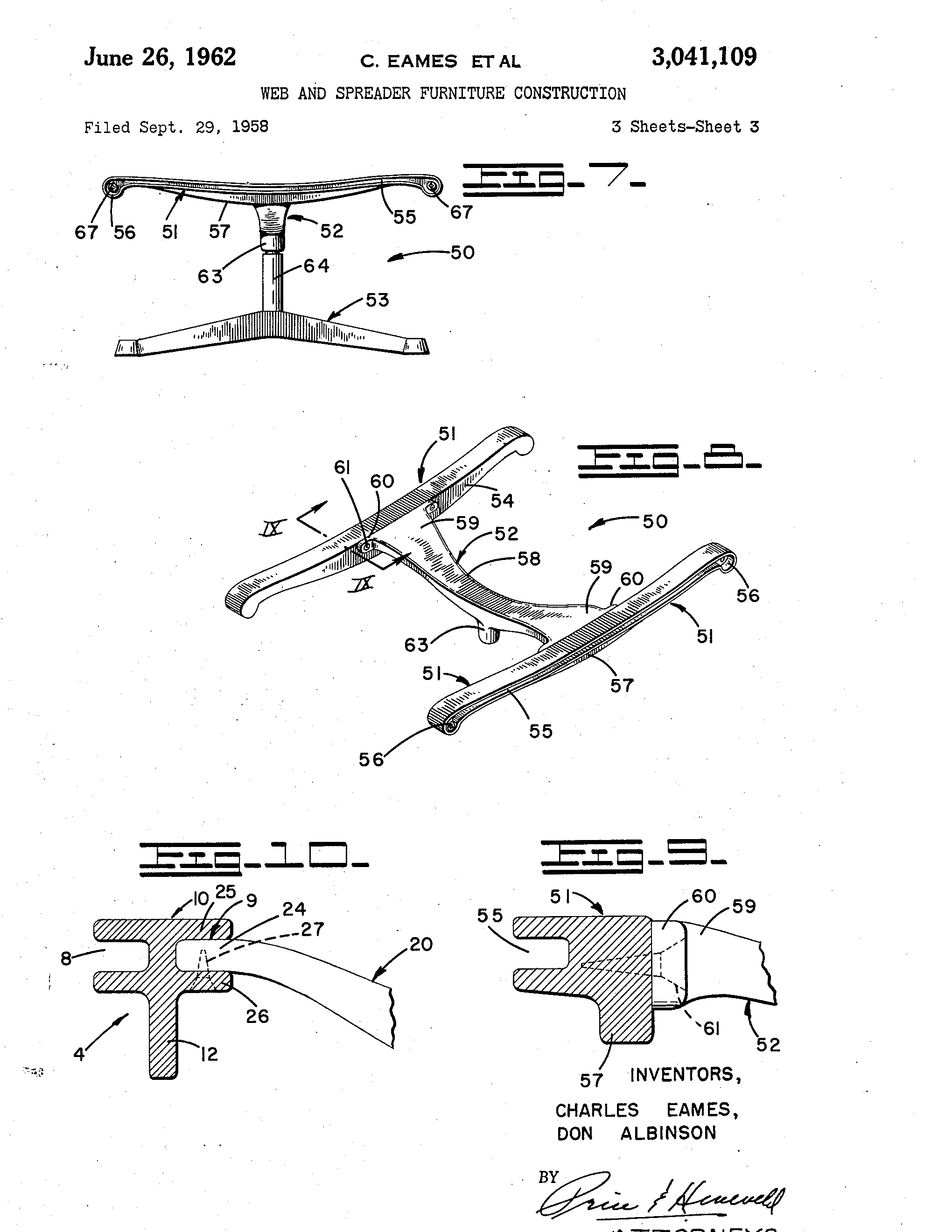
1958 patent drawing "sheets" for an Aluminum Group chair (US Patent 3,041,109 issued in 1962)

The chair has been in production by Herman Miller since its inception in 1958, although details have changed over time. The original seat material was a mesh, which was quickly discontinued, with the most iconic version being black leather. In 1969, the Eames added a "Soft Pad" version with cushions. In 2001, a version with "Cygnus" mesh (similar to the Aeron chair's Pellicle) was introduced. The pedestal base design has undergone several variants, including four legs with floor glides, redesigned four legs with glides or castors, and five legs with glides or casters. The current workplace versions use the 5-leg configuration. The Aluminum Group chairs are also manufactured and sold by Vitra in Europe.

Contestants on the British quiz show Mastermind and Mastermind Australia use the soft pad variant with detachable arms.

== Variants ==
As of 2023, it is produced in multiple formats: the management chair (34–37" high), the side chair (same but no arms, originally designed as a dining chair), the executive chair (42–45"), and the lounge chair (39", originally with or without arms) and ottoman.

== See also ==
- A Taxonomy of Office Chairs – Non-fiction work by Jonathan Olivares
- List of chairs
