= Don Chadwick =

American furniture designer

Donald "Don" T. Chadwick (born 1936) is an American industrial designer specializing in office seating.

== Early life ==
He was born in Los Angeles and developed an interest in furniture making from his grandfather, a cabinetmaker. He studied design at the University of California, Los Angeles.

== Career ==
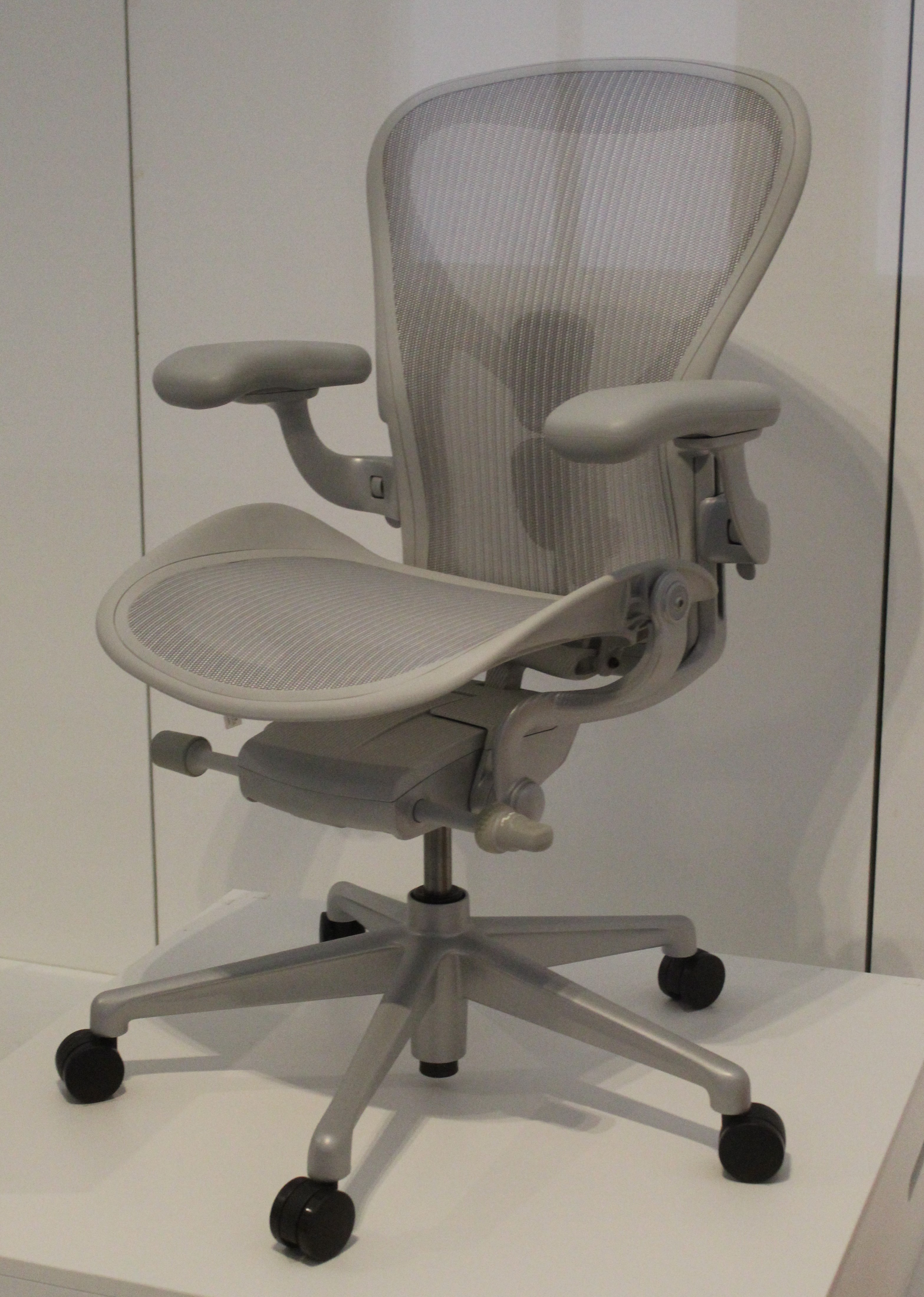
Aeron chair prototype, Victoria and Albert Museum

He worked for architect Victor Gruen, and in 1964 founded his own practice. As a young designer Chadwick gained recognition for his entries in the Pasadena Art Museum's California Design exhibitions. His 1968 prototype for cardboard furniture predates the easy edges cardboard furniture by Frank Gehry. He also experimented with industrial processes such as rotational moulding. He has designed the Chadwick modular seating system (1974) and, in cooperation with Bill Stumpf, the Equa 1 (1984) and the Aeron chair (1994), all for Herman Miller. Among his recent designs is the Chadwick chair and Spark chair for Knoll, and Ballo for Human Scale.

== Publications ==
- Friedman, Mildred, Ed. A Serious Chair — Design Quarterly 126. Minneapolis and Cambridge: The Walker Art Center and Massachusetts Institute of Technology, 1984. ISSN 0011-9415
- Olivares, Jonathan, Ed. Don Chadwick Photography 1961–2005. Barcelona: Apartamento Publishing S.L., 2019 ISBN 978-84-09-11610-2
- Amy Auscherman, Sam Gawe, Leon Ransmeier, Eds. "Ergon Chairs 1976" in Herman Miller: A Way of Living. London: Phaidon Press, 2019. 460–481 ISBN 9780714875217
