= Aeron chair =

Office chair designed by Don Chadwick and Bill Stumpf

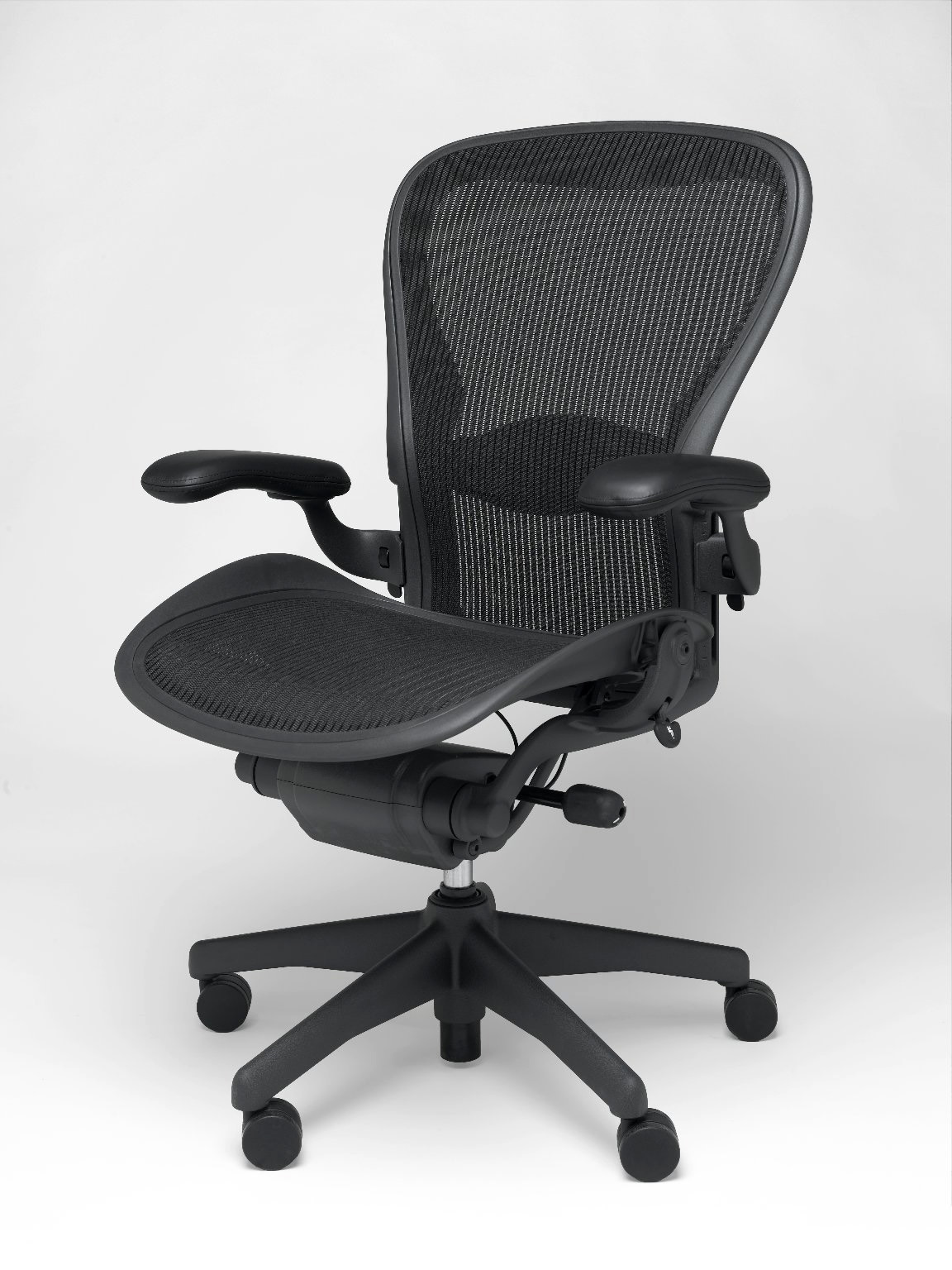
- The Aeron chair
- Designer: Don Chadwick and Bill Stumpf
- Date: 1994
- Sold by: Herman Miller (United States)

The Aeron chair is an office chair manufactured and sold by American furniture company Herman Miller. Introduced in 1994, it was designed by Don Chadwick and Bill Stumpf and departed from the design of traditional office chairs by eschewing upholstery in favor of fabric mesh. It received numerous accolades for its industrial design and is featured in the Museum of Modern Art's permanent collection. It has been cited as the best-selling individual office chair in the United States with over 9 million sold.

== Development ==
Development of the Aeron chair began in the late 1970s, after Herman Miller hired designers Don Chadwick and Bill Stumpf. They sought to design a chair that improved upon the shortcomings of La-Z-Boy recliners that were often used in residential and medical settings for the elderly, and completed a prototype called the Sarah Chair in 1988. Herman Miller cancelled the Sarah Chair after deeming it unlikely to be commercially viable, and tasked them with designing an office chair.

According to Chadwick, they were tasked by Herman Miller to update the company's previous best-selling office chair, not to design the ideal chair for an eight-hour workday. He said, "We were given a brief and basically told to design the next-generation office chair." They carried over some design concepts from the Sarah Chair, such as a semi-reclining mechanism that simultaneously moved the seat and chairback, to benefit professionals who worked long hours on computers. Early prototypes included foam and upholstery which were abandoned in favor of a fabric mesh called "pellicle" that they found would be more moldable to the user and more breathable, a concept carried over from the Sarah Chair to prevent bedsores. Herman Miller's marketing department was initially apprehensive about selling a chair without upholstery, but the company approved the design. The Aeron chair was introduced in October 1994 and priced at $1,000. It was reportedly named after the Celtic god Aeron, as well as referring to aeration and aeronautics.

The suspended "pellicle" mesh seat and backrest are moulded into glass-fiber reinforced plastic frames. The Aeron chair is made out of recycled materials, and 94 percent of the chair itself is recyclable. It was available in three sizes, A (smallest), B and C (largest), and originally included a height-adjustable lumbar support pad. In 2002, an updated ergonomic support system called PostureFit was introduced to improve lower back support. In 2005, the arms switched from a dial to a lever to loosen for height adjustment. Variants produced include a wheelless version with a flat base named the Aeron Side Chair, and a higher version with a footrest named the Aeron Stool.

In 2016, Herman Miller released a redesigned version of the chair named the Aeron Remastered, later sold and marketed as simply Aeron. Chadwick contributed to the updated design, Stumpf having died in 2006. It includes an updated suspension system, better spine support, a redesigned denser mesh and a re-engineered tilt. Some components that were previously aluminum were switched to plastic. The original version of the chair was given the retronym "Aeron Classic".

In 2026, Herman Miller announced a further update, adding new colorways and material changes, including a generatively engineered aluminium base.

== Reception ==
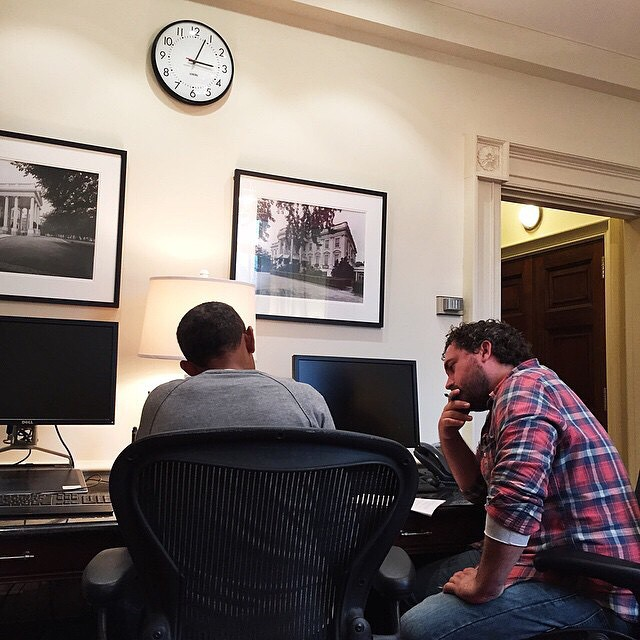
President Barack Obama seated in an Aeron chair while writing his State of the Union address in 2015

According to Bloomberg, the Aeron chair "made a fetish of lumbar support". Architect Galen Cranz said that while the company is aware that a perching position (facilitated by the chair's rounded front rail) is preferable, it put in the lumbar support to conform to public expectations—"because that's what people think is required for it to be a scientifically 'good' chair." Of the "pellicle" mesh she said, "one of the secrets of the success of that chair was finding that fabric they called ‘pellicle’. That sheer but resistant fabric hit on the right gestalt for where our culture was at."

Sitting expert A.C. Mandal has criticized the Aeron for being "far too low" and not offering enough height adjustment and opportunities for the sitter to move.

The Aeron chair has been credited with revolutionizing the design of office chairs. According to architecture professor Witold Rybczynski, the Aeron was a "rejection of the traditional corporate chair hierarchy," and led to a decline of larger, high-back executive chairs among executives. According to New York, "Aerons were hailed as triumphs of industrial design and were a whole different beast from the overstuffed leather power chairs that dominated the Old Economy." Wired described the Aeron's appearance as "a chair that looked more engineered than designed."

In 1994, before the Aeron chair's general release, Museum of Modern Art curator Paola Antonelli added it to the museum's permanent collection. An Aeron chair is also displayed in the Brooklyn Museum.

In 2025, the Aeron chair was included in Pirouette: Turning Points in Design, an exhibition at the Museum of Modern Art featuring "widely recognized design icons [...] highlighting pivotal moments in design history."

== Sales and market ==
The Aeron chair was a success and its sales far exceeded Herman Miller's expectations. Aeron chairs were popular in the offices of Internet startups in the late 1990s, and became associated with the dot-com bubble. Wired noted, "In Silicon Valley, especially, it quickly became a status symbol, visually synonymous with the optimism of the dot-com boom." A 2006 article in New York magazine called the Aeron "the Dot-Com Throne", writing that the chairs "became shorthand for the countless companies that didn't have a clue how to make money on the Internet, but, man, did they have the know-how to set up a cool office". The Aeron was so popular that after the bubble burst, one commenter described the piles of unused chairs as reminiscent of a "corporate graveyard" of office furniture.

In 2010, Bloomberg stated that the Aeron was the best-selling individual office chair in the United States. As of 2026, more than nine million Aeron chairs had been sold, and Wallpaper reported a replacement rate of 0.055 percent.

== See also ==
- List of chairs
- List of works in the Museum of Modern Art
