= Office chair =

Chair designed for use at an office

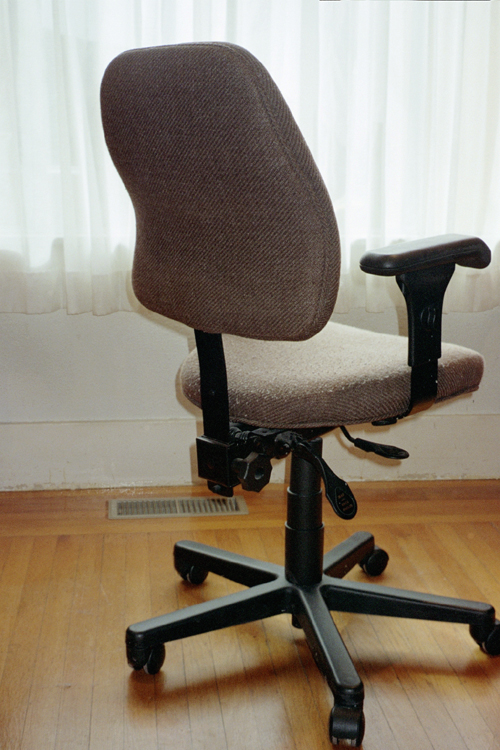
An office chair that can swivel and be adjusted to various heights and angles

An office chair, or desk chair, is a type of chair that is designed for use at a desk in an office. It is usually a swivel chair, with a set of wheels for mobility and adjustable height. Modern office chairs typically use a single, distinctive load bearing leg (often called a gas lift), which is positioned underneath the chair seat. Near the floor this leg spreads out into several smaller feet, which are often wheeled and called casters. Office chairs were developed around the mid-19th century as more workers spent their shifts sitting at a desk, leading to the adoption of several features not found on other chairs.

== History ==
The concept of a swiveling chair with castors was illustrated by the Nuremberg patrician Martin Löffelholz von Kolberg in his 1505 technological illuminated manuscript, the so-called Codex Löffelholz, on folio 10r. One of the earliest known innovators to have created the modern office chair was naturalist Charles Darwin, who put wheels on the chair in his study so he could get to his specimens more quickly.

With the advent of rail transport in the mid-19th century, businesses began to expand beyond the traditional model of a family business with little emphasis on administration. The additional administrative staff was required to keep up with orders, bookkeeping, and correspondence as businesses expanded their service areas. While office work was expanding, an awareness of office environments, technology, and equipment became part of the cultural focus on increasing productivity. This awareness gave rise to chairs designed specifically for these new administrative employees: office chairs. American inventor Thomas E. Warren (b. 1808), designed the Centripetal Spring Armchair in 1849 which was produced by the American Chair Company in Troy, New York. It was first presented at the 1851 Great Exhibition in London. It was only around 1850 when a group of engineers in the United States began to investigate how chairs could improve health and relaxation by stressing posture and movement.

The office chair was strategically designed to increase the productivity of clerical employees by making it possible for them to remain sitting at their desks for long periods of time. A swiveling chair with casters allowed employees to remain sitting and yet reach a number of locations within their work area, eliminating the time and energy expended in standing. The wooden saddle seat was designed to fit and support the body of a sitting employee, and the slatted back and armrests provided additional support to increase the employee’s comfort. Like modern chairs, many of these models were somewhat adjustable to provide the maximum comfort and thus the maximum working time. Famous designers sometimes designed chairs intended for office employees.

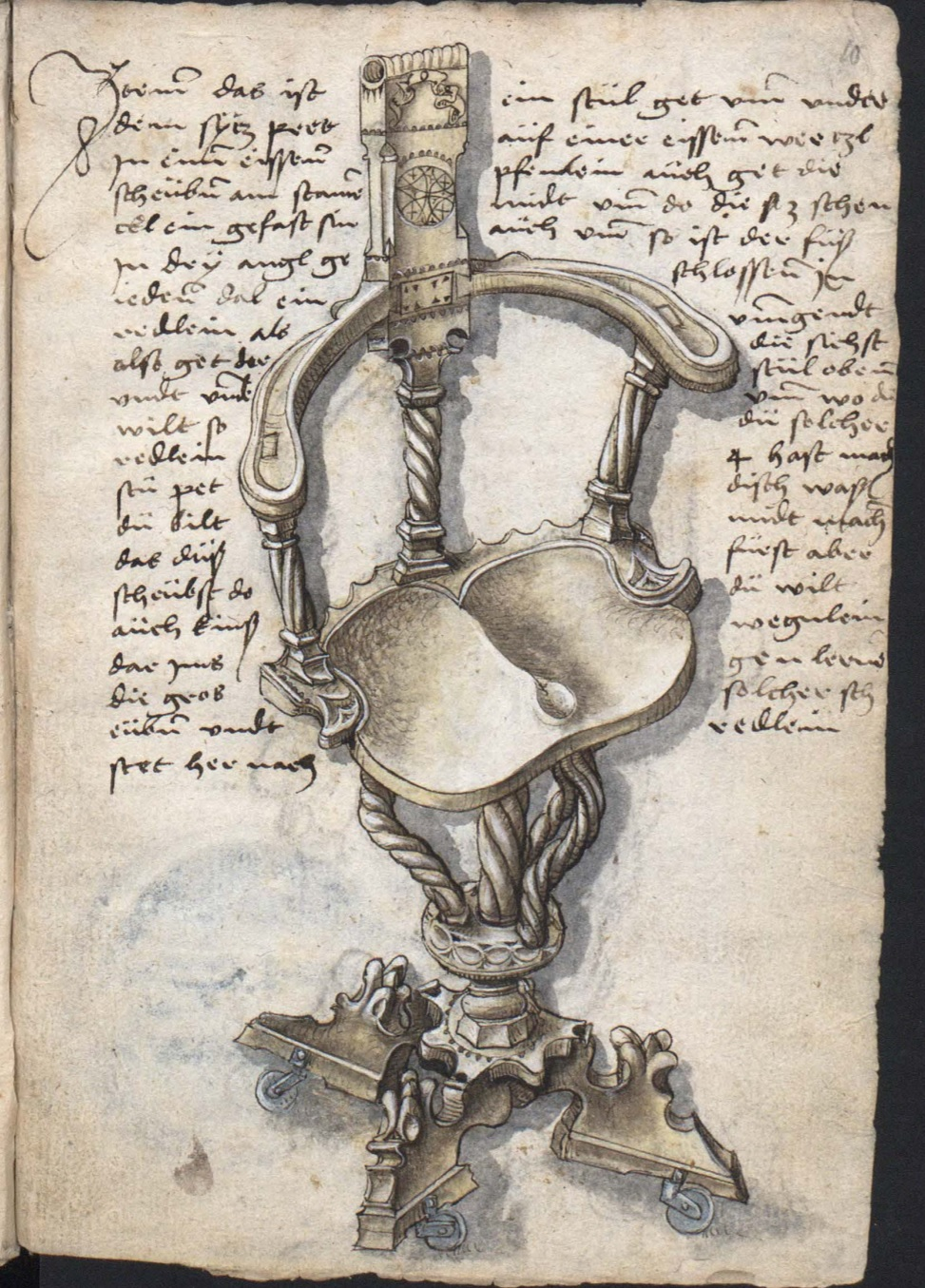
Concept of a rotating chair with swivel wheels from Löffelholz-codex from Nuremberg, Germany, dated 1505

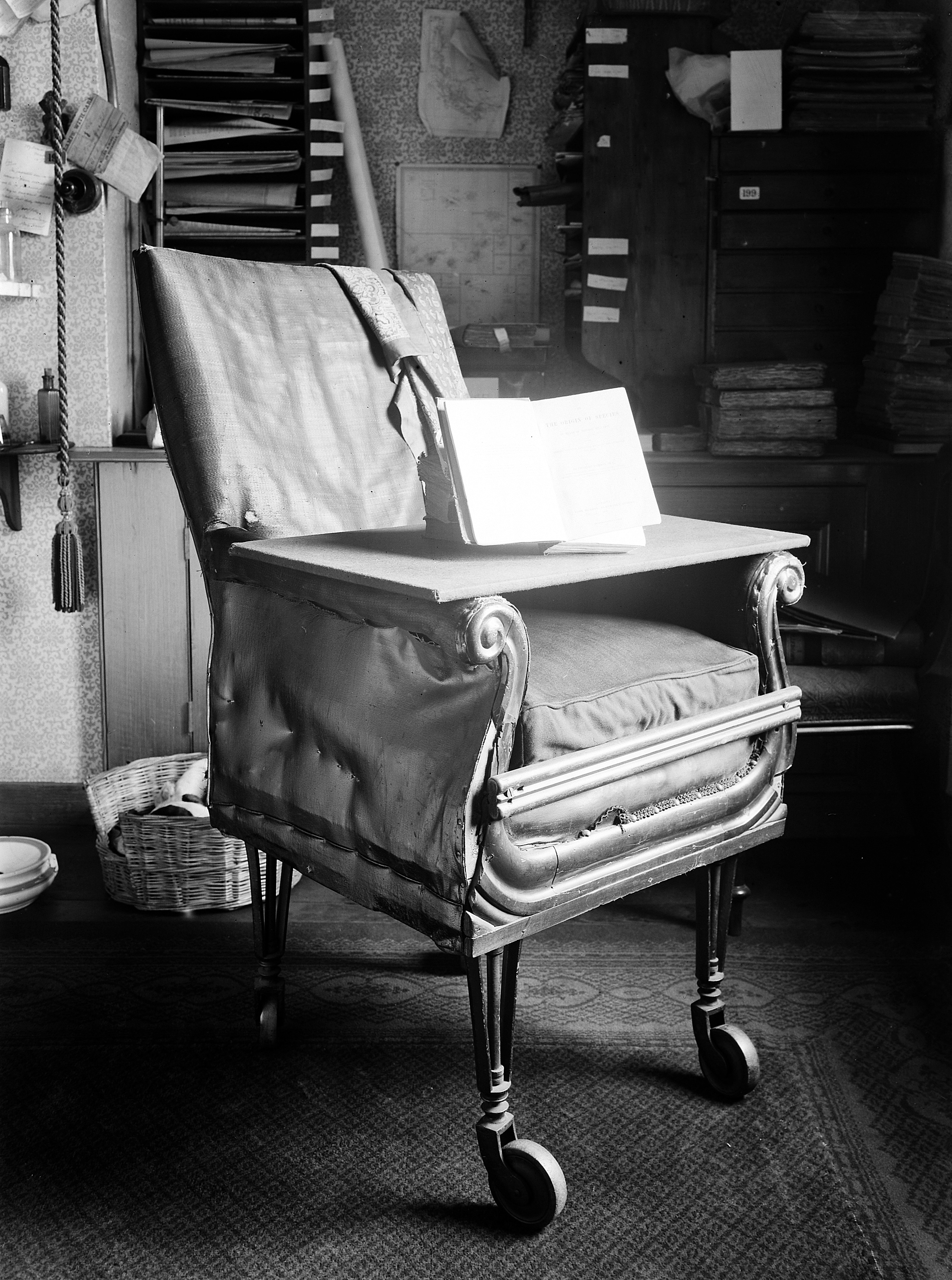
Charles Darwin’s chair in Down House

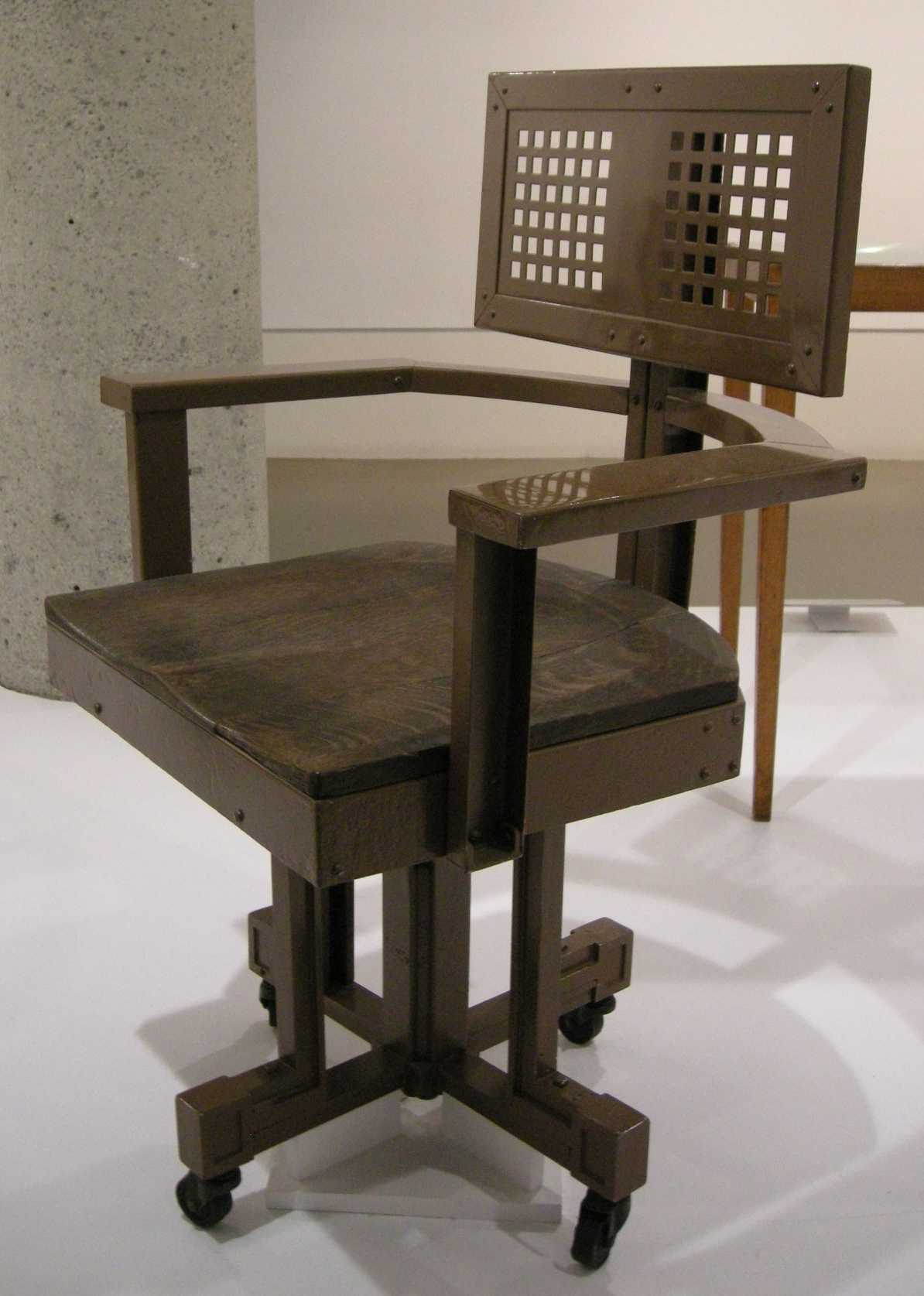
Larkin office chair by Frank Lloyd Wright, 1904–06

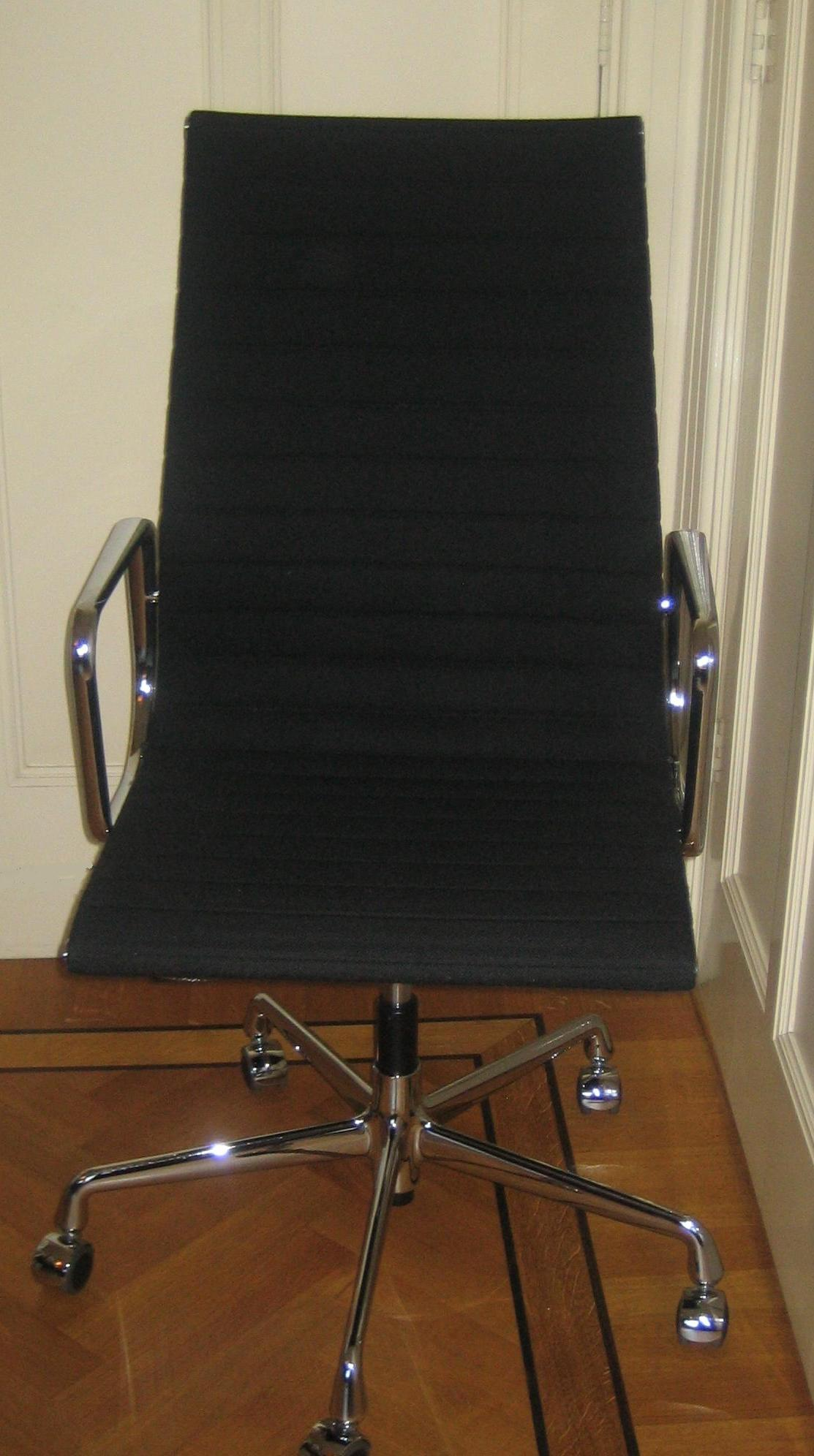
Eames Aluminum Group chair by Charles and Ray Eames, 1958

== Types ==
There are multiple kinds of office chairs designed to suit different needs. The most basic is the task chair, which typically does not offer lumbar support or a headrest. These chairs generally cannot be sat in for more than a couple hours at a time without becoming uncomfortable, though they often offer more room to move than higher-end chairs.

Mid-back chairs offer fuller back support, and with the right ergonomic design, can be sat in for four hours at a time or longer. High-end chairs in this category, such as the Herman Miller Aeron and the Steelcase Leap are comfortable for long periods. Some mid-back chairs in particular offer customization options that can allow for a headrest to be added.

Executive or full-back chairs offer full back and head support. Many executive chairs are designed to be sat in for eight or more hours at a time. These are typically the most expensive office chairs and often feature genuine leather upholstery.

For appropriately seating above average tall and/or heavy office workers, extra spacious and sturdy constructed chairs are offered. Office chairs designed for safely and comfortably supporting increased weights and sizes have to use durable (metal) structural components, making these chairs heavier than office chairs designed for average sized people. (Note: The usage forces exerted on chairs by people weighing over 136 kilograms (300 lb), during a hard sitting down impact, can peak at 213% in terms of their body weight.)

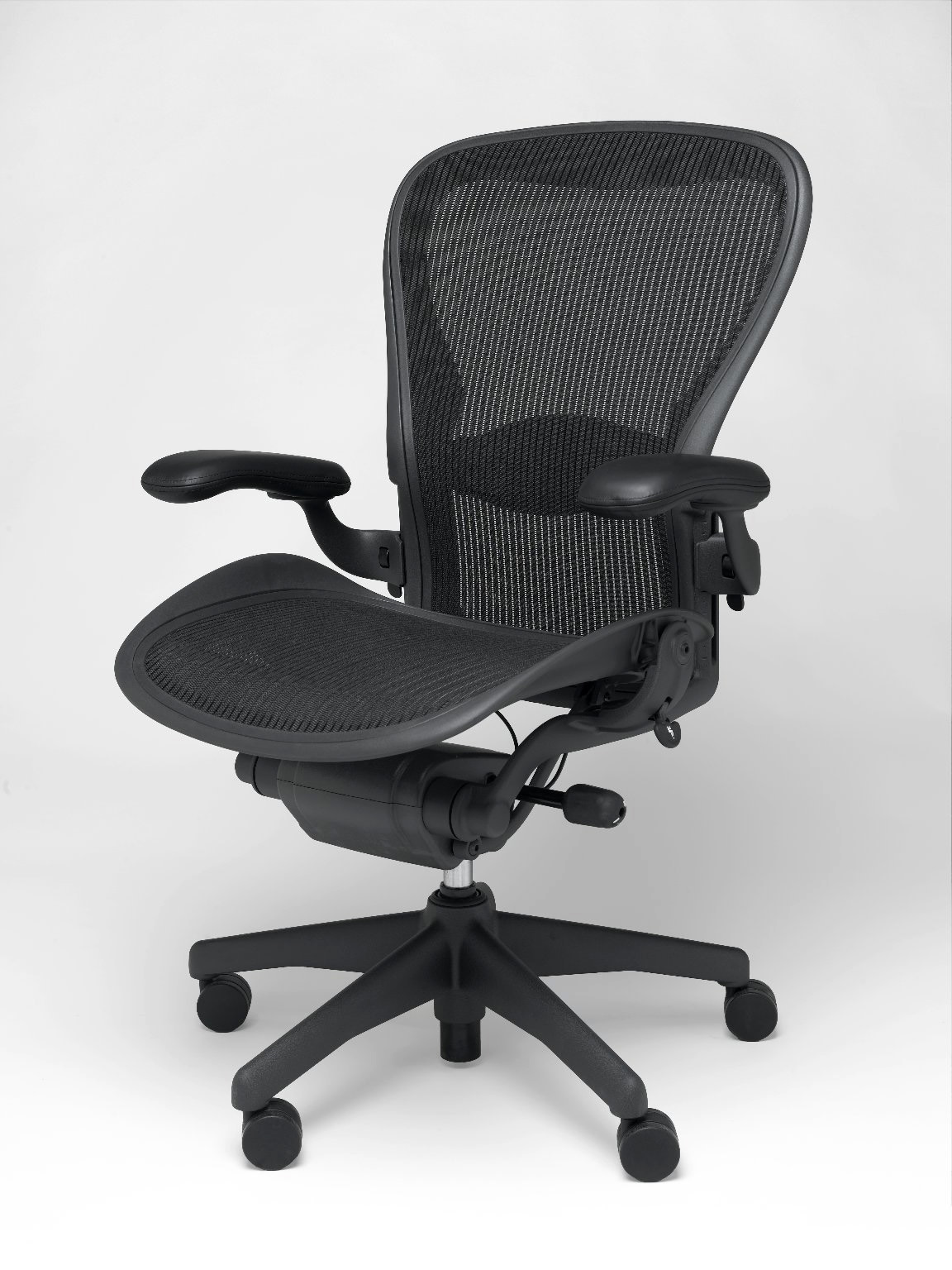
Aeron chair by Herman Miller

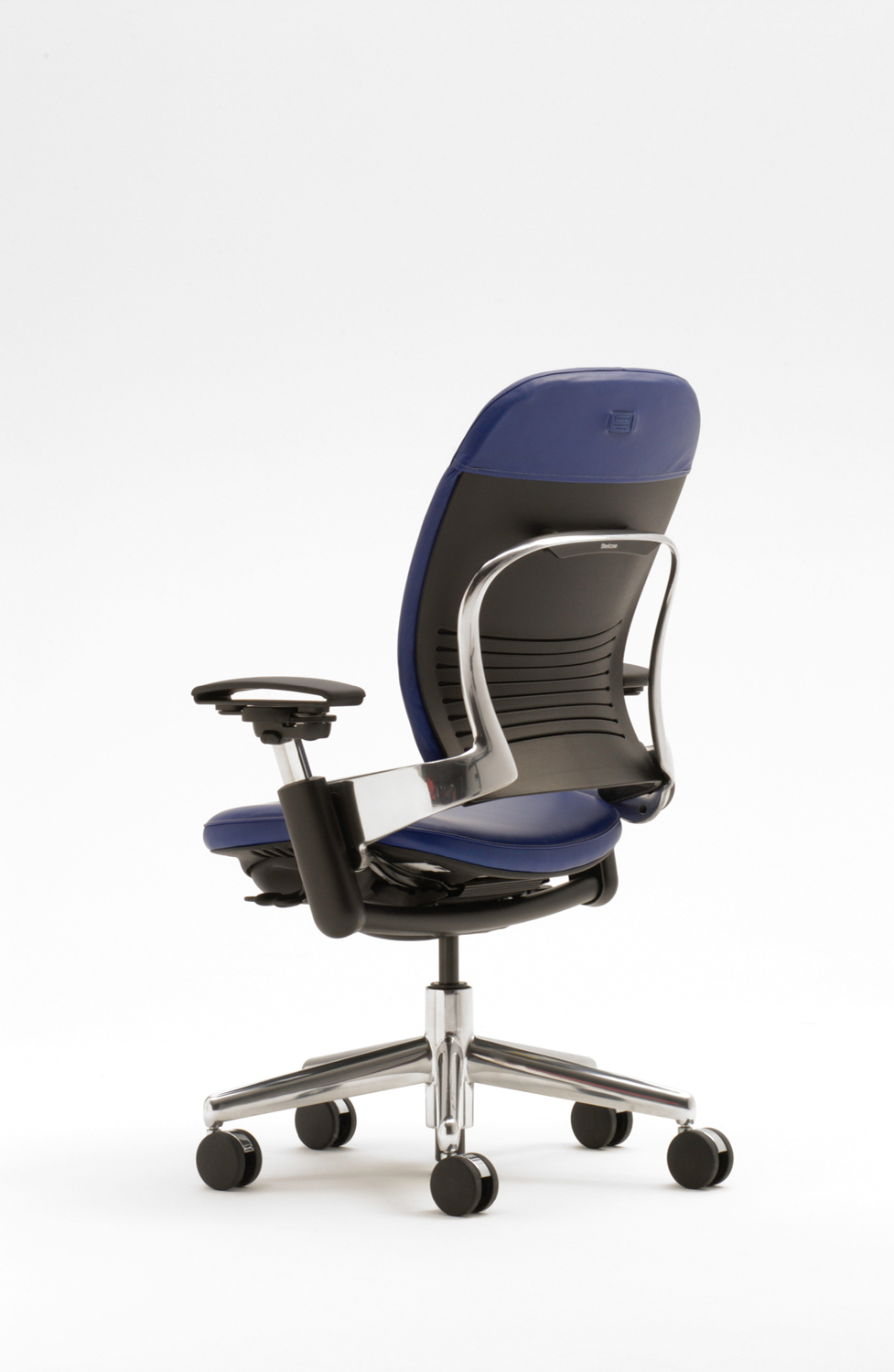
Leap by Steelcase

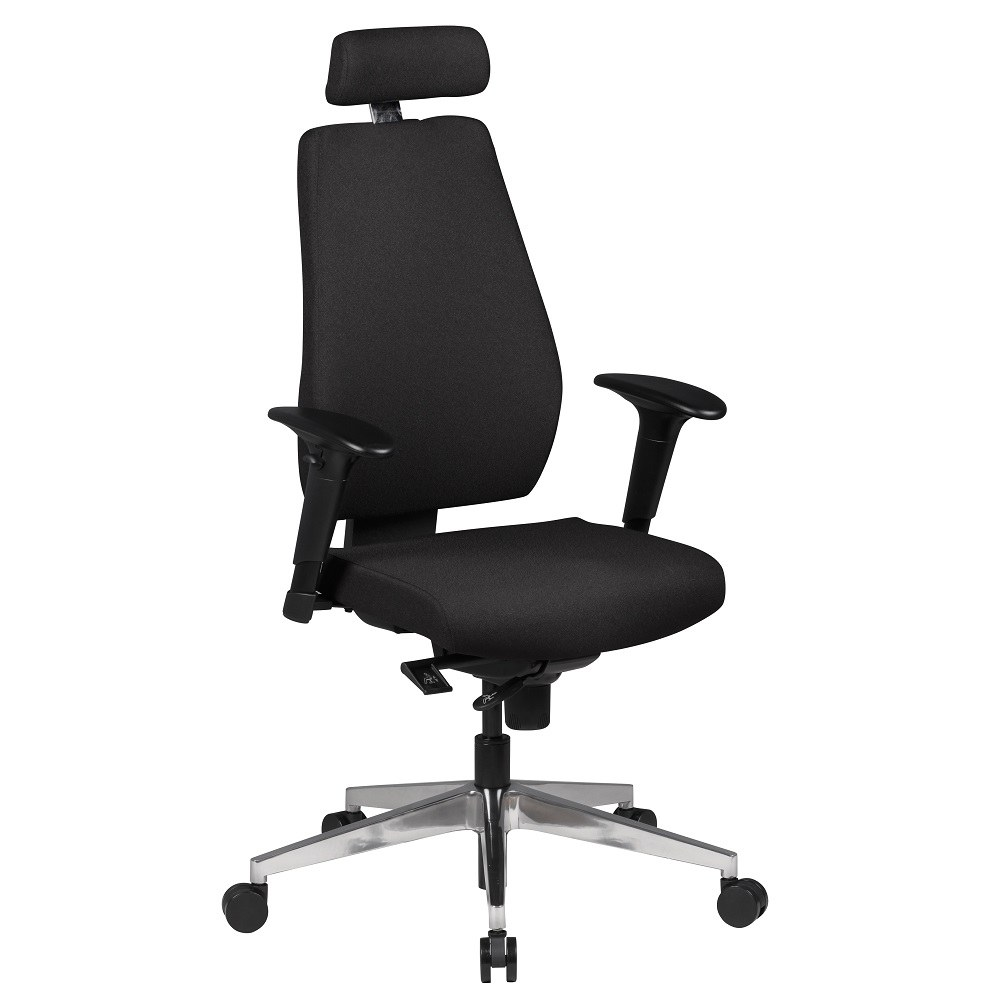
Full-back chair with head pillow support

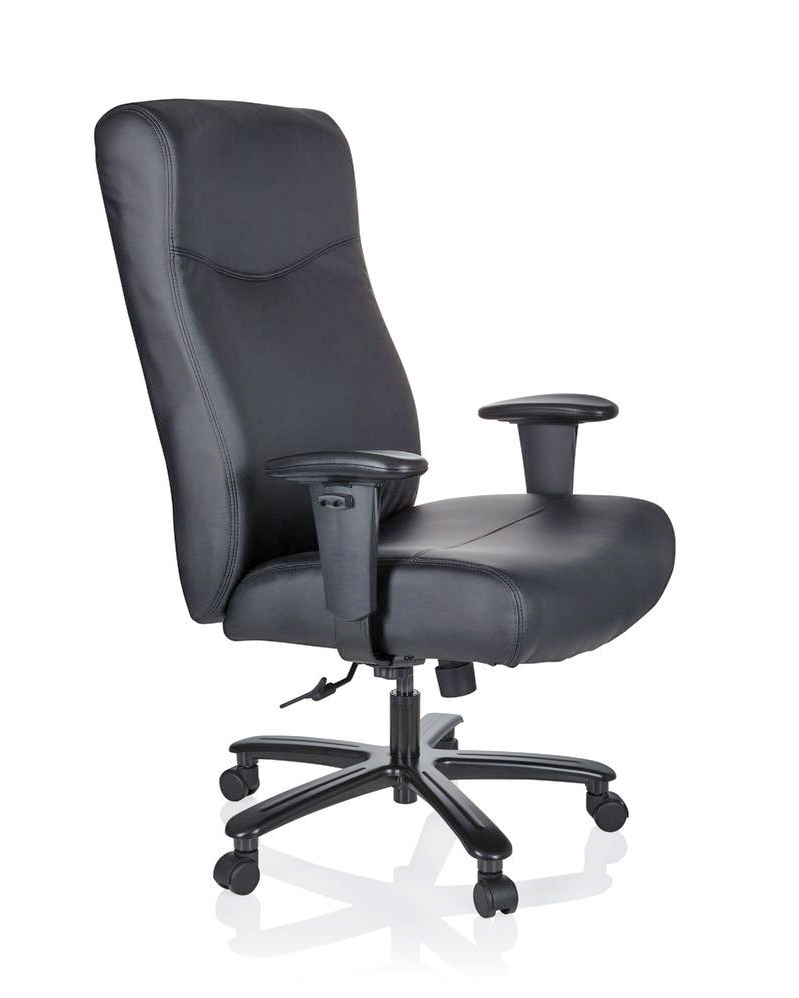
A leather executive office chair

== Ergonomics ==
In the 1970s, ergonomics became an important design consideration. Today, office chairs often have adjustable seats, armrests, backs, lumbar support, heights, and footrests, to prevent repetitive stress injury and back pain associated with sitting for long periods.

An “ergonomic” office chair can be “personalized” through numerous adjustment options:

- The seat height is adjustable (with a lever that acts on a gas lift cylinder).
- The armrests are height adjustable, also in the width between them and the direction is adjustable. There are also armrests that can be turned backwards (behind the backrest).
- The seat inclination of many synchronous mechanisms can be adjusted in two stages in addition to the synchronous mechanism.
- It is particularly important for smaller or larger people to be able to move the seat back and forth or to have seats of different lengths (“depths”). The seat depth should be adjusted so that the backrest can be touched, but the backs of the knees are free so that blood circulation is not hindered there.
- The backrest should be height adjustable so that the back can be supported from the top edge of the pelvis.
- A footrest is a small platform for resting your feet while sitting. It relieves pressure, promotes better posture, and enhances comfort during extended periods of sitting.
- There is usually a locking lever that can be used to stop the chair from swinging. The lock should be used occasionally to challenge and promote the body's postural muscles by not leaning when the chair is locked.

== See also ==
- A Taxonomy of Office Chairs
- Armrest
- Centripetal Spring Armchair
- Coccydynia
- Gaming chair
- List of chairs
- Right to sit
- Standing desk
- Swivel chair
