= Hood chair =

Historic doorman's chair

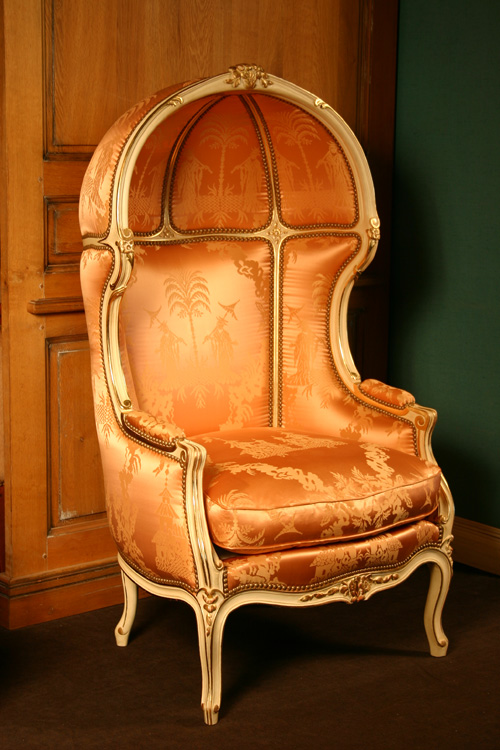
A reconstruction Louis-15th-style hood chair

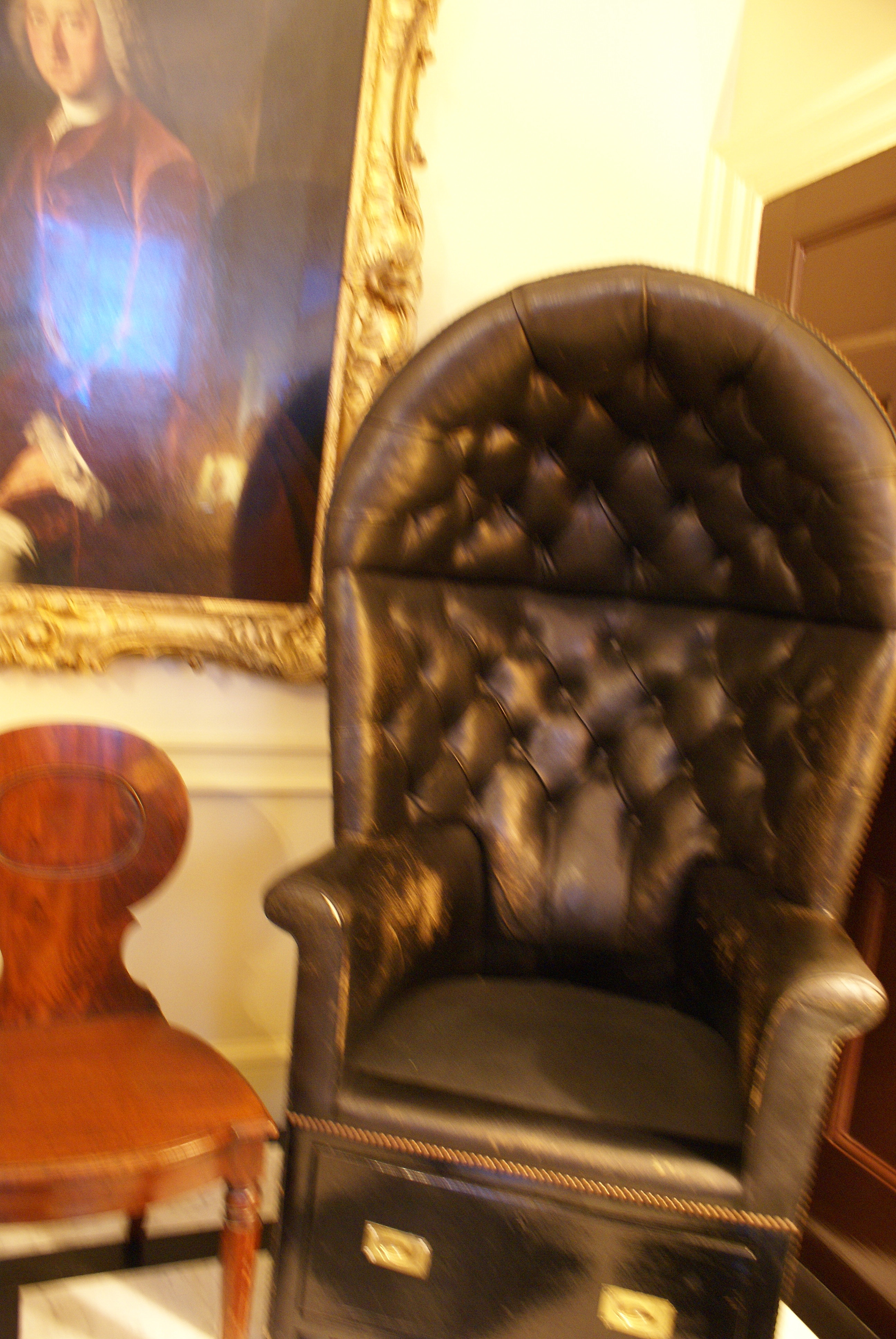
A hood chair used by the porter or doorkeeper at Number 10 Downing Street, one of the 10 Downing Street Guard Chairs.

A hood chair or porter's chair is a type of chair originally used in medieval England and later France. Usually made of wood, but sometimes formed in a high-grade leather or red velvet, it was placed by the front door of an estate or home for use by a gatekeeper servant who was in charge of screening guests and visitors. This was necessary since the door knocker might not be heard throughout the house.

Since there were often cold breezes near a front door, the chair was designed to envelop and keep the servant relatively warm in his task of remaining at the door for long periods. It could be described as a hollowed-out egg shape, with a very high and enclosed back, standing on end, four legs, with handrests and usually with a notch for a lantern at the side, allowing the person to sink back into it out of the wind and await visitors' knocks. Notable current survivors exist at the London Branch of the Bank of England, Museum of Leathercraft, Abington, Northampton and at various antique auction houses in the UK and US.

== See also ==
- List of chairs
- Watchman's chair
