= 10 Downing Street Guard Chairs =

Set of antique chairs

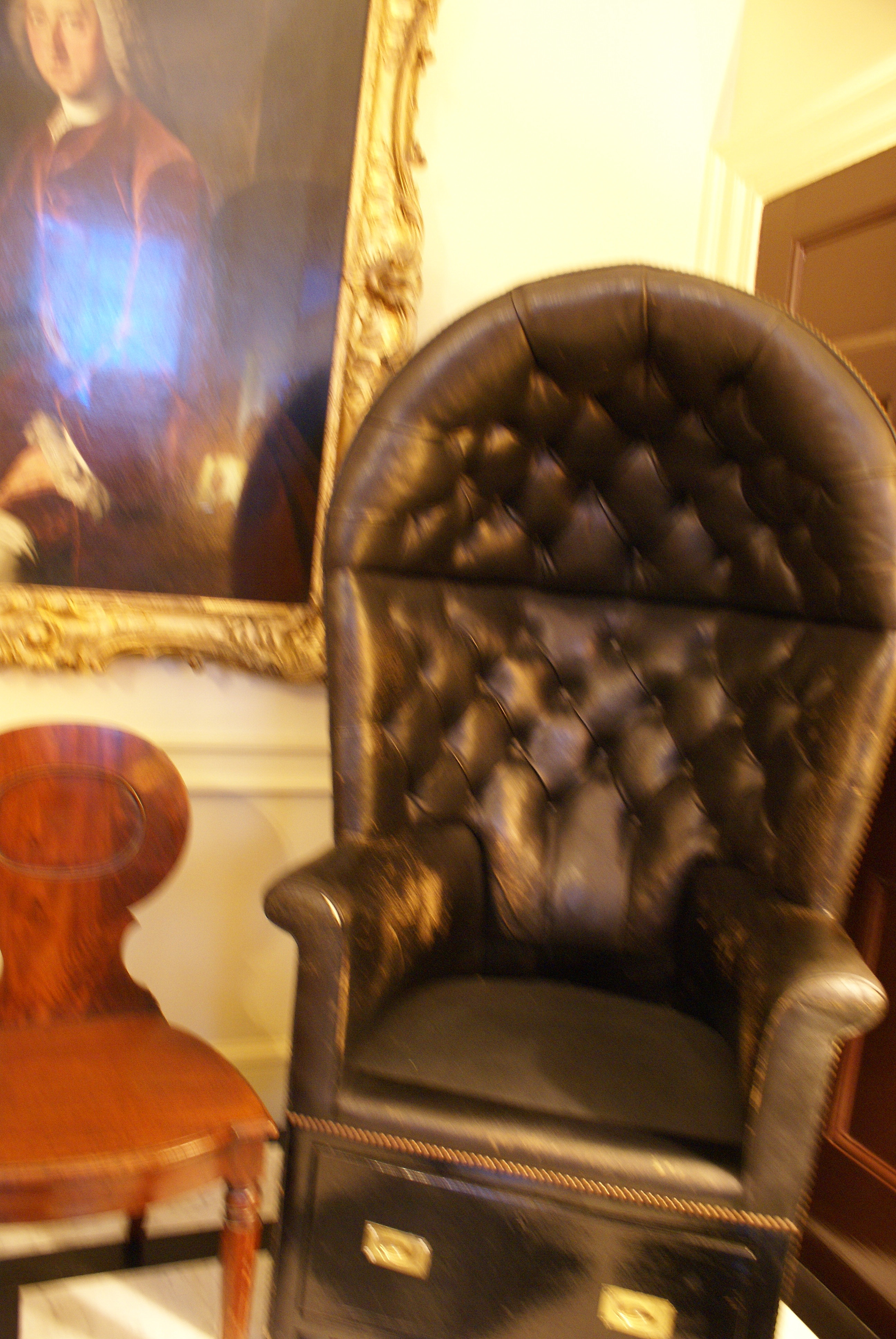
One of the original chairs

The 10 Downing Street Guard Chairs are two antique porter's chairs. In the early 19th century, 10 Downing Street was guarded by two men who sat outside the building in leather chairs made by Thomas Chippendale. There was a drawer underneath the chair which was filled with hot coals to keep the guards warm whilst on duty. The chairs were hood chairs, made with a circular back and hood, both to shield the guards from bad weather and to improve the surrounding acoustics, thereby allowing the guard to hear better from a wider angle.

== Current state ==
The chairs still exist. One of them (also known as the Hall Porter's Chair) stands in the entrance to 10 Downing Street; the other is owned by a private collector of furniture. The fraying of the inner arm rests evident in the accompanying picture is the result of the guards' pistols repeatedly rubbing against the fabric during their watch.
