= List of residents of 10 Downing Street =

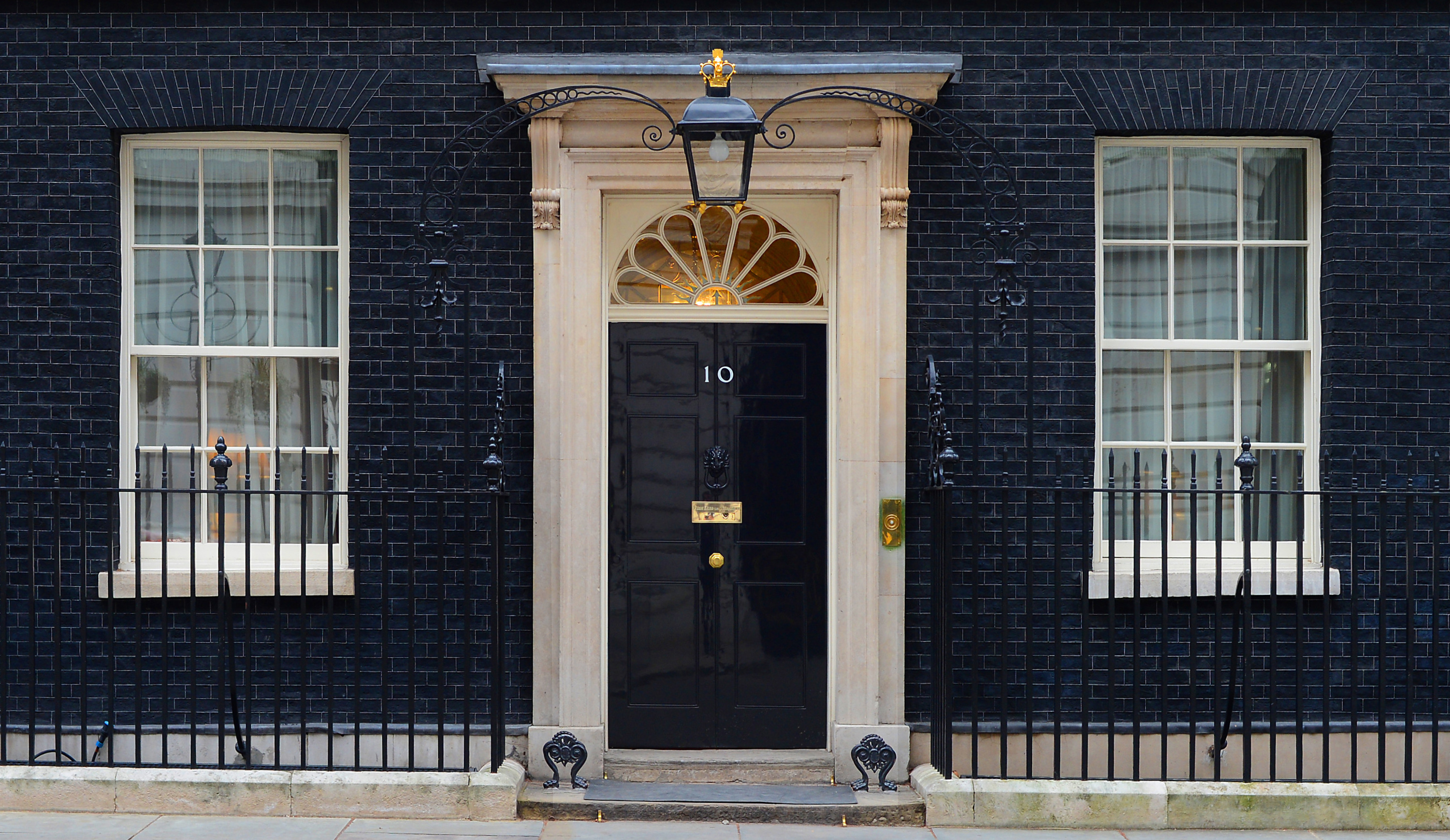
10 Downing Street in London

Number 10 Downing Street is the residence and office of the First Lord of the Treasury as Prime Minister of the United Kingdom. The headquarters of His Majesty's Government, it is situated on Downing Street in the City of Westminster in London, England.

Number 10 was originally three houses: a stately mansion overlooking St James's Park called "the house at the back" built around 1530, a modest townhouse behind it located at 10 Downing Street and a small cottage next to Number 10. The townhouse, from which the modern building gets its name, was one of several built by Sir George Downing between 1682 and 1684.

Below is a list of the residents of Number 10 and the House at the Back from 1650 to the present.

== Residents of Number 10 Downing Street and The House at the Back, 1650–present ==
Prime Ministers are indicated in bold.

Name of resident(s)	Offices(s) held while in residence (if any)	Year(s) in residence
**The House at the Back: Before 1733**
George Villiers, 2nd Duke of Buckingham	Member of the Cabal Ministry	1673–1676
Edward Lee, 1st Earl of Lichfield	Master of the Horse	1677–1690
Henry Nassau, Lord Overkirk	Master of the Horse	1690–1708
Frances Nassau, Lady Overkirk	Widow of Lord Overkirk	1708–1720
Johann Caspar von Bothmar, Count Bothmar	Envoy from Hanover; advisor to George I and George II	1720–1732
**Number 10 Downing Street: Before 1733**
Elizabeth Paston, Countess of Yarmouth	—	1688–1690
George Granville, 1st Baron Lansdowne	—	1692–1696
Henry Nassau,1st Earl of Grantham	Master of the Horse	1699–1703
**Number 10 Downing Street, including the House at the Back: 1735 and After**
	Between 1733 and 1735, the architect William Kent, under a commission from Sir Robert Walpole, combined Litchfield House and one of the Downing Street townhouses into one house, known since as Number 10 Downing Street, officially the residence of the First Lord of the Treasury.	
**Sir Robert Walpole**	First Lord of the Treasury, Chancellor of the Exchequer	1735–1742
Samuel Sandys, later 1st Baron Sandys	Chancellor of the Exchequer	1742–1744
Henry Pelham-Clinton, Earl of Lincoln	Prime Minister Henry Pelham's nephew and son-in-law	1745–1753
Lewis Watson	Prime Minister Henry Pelham's son-in-law	1753–1754
Henry Bilson-Legge	Chancellor of the Exchequer	1754–1761
Thomas Pelham	Lord Commissioner of the Admiralty	1762
Sir Francis Dashwood	Chancellor of the Exchequer	1762–1763
**George Grenville**	First Lord of the Treasury and Chancellor of the Exchequer	1763–1765
William Dowdeswell	Chancellor of the Exchequer	1765–1766
	During 1766, Number 10 underwent extensive repairs and reconstruction.	
Charles Townshend	Chancellor of the Exchequer	1766–1767
Frederick North, Lord North	Chancellor of the Exchequer	1767–1770
**Frederick North, Lord North**	First Lord of the Treasury, Chancellor of the Exchequer	1770–1782
Sir John Cavendish (doubtful)	Chancellor of the Exchequer	1782
William Pitt the Younger	Chancellor of the Exchequer	1782–1783
**William Cavendish-Bentinck, 3rd Duke of Portland**	First Lord of the Treasury	1783
	During 1783, Number 10 again underwent extensive repairs and alterations.	
**William Pitt the Younger**	First Lord of the Treasury, Chancellor of the Exchequer	1783–1801
**Henry Addington**	First Lord of the Treasury, Chancellor of the Exchequer	1801–1804
**William Pitt the Younger**	First Lord of the Treasury, Chancellor of the Exchequer	1804–1806
	William Pitt lived in Number 10 for a total of twenty years, more than any Prime Minister before or since. This long residency helped to establish an association in the public mind between the house and the office.	
**William Wyndham Grenville, 1st Baron Grenville**	First Lord of the Treasury	1806–1807
**William Cavendish-Bentinck, 3rd Duke of Portland**	First Lord of the Treasury	1807
Spencer Perceval	Chancellor of the Exchequer	1807–1809
**Spencer Perceval**	First Lord of the Treasury, Chancellor of the Exchequer	1809–1812
Charles Arbuthnot	Joint Secretary to the Treasury	1810
Nicholas Vansittart	Chancellor of the Exchequer	1812–1823
Frederick John Robinson	Chancellor of the Exchequer	1823–1827
**George Canning**	First Lord of the Treasury, Chancellor of the Exchequer	1827–1828
**F. J. Robinson, 1st Viscount Goderich**	First Lord of the Treasury	1827–1828
**Arthur Wellesley, 1st Duke of Wellington**	First Lord of the Treasury	1828–1830
	For the first seven months of his ministry, Wellesley refused to live in Number 10 because he thought it too small. He moved in only because his home, Apsley House, required extensive repairs. He returned to Apsley House eighteen months later.	
Earl of Bathurst	Lord President of the Council	1830
**Charles Grey, 2nd Earl Grey**	First Lord of the Treasury	1830–1834
Sir Thomas Fremantle	Secretary to Sir Robert Peel	1835
	The residential part of Number 10 was vacant for three years from 1835 to 1838 during the Melbourne Ministry.	
The Hon William Cowper and G. E. Anson	Private secretaries to Lord Melbourne	1838
G. E. Anson	Private secretary to Lord Melbourne	1839–1840
Edward Drummond	Private secretary to Sir Robert Peel	1842
Edward Drummond and W. H. Stephenson	Chief private secretary and junior private secretary to Sir Robert Peel	1843
W. H. Stephenson and George Arbuthnot	Chief private secretary and junior private secretary to Sir Robert Peel	1844–1846
George Keppel, Charles Grey, and R.W. Grey	Private secretaries to Lord John Russell	1847
	The residential part of Number 10 was vacant for the next thirty years and the house was used only for Cabinet meetings and office space.	
	In 1877, Disraeli ordered extensive repairs and redecorating of Number 10 so that he could live there, as did Gladstone during his 1880–85 ministry. From this time, every First Lord has lived in Number 10, although not all were also Prime Minister.	
**Benjamin Disraeli, 1st Earl of Beaconsfield**	First Lord of the Treasury	1877–1880
**William Ewart Gladstone**	First Lord of the Treasury, Chancellor of the Exchequer (April 1880 – December 1882)	1880–1885
Sir Stafford Northcote	First Lord of the Treasury	1885–1886
**William Ewart Gladstone**	First Lord of the Treasury	1886
**Robert Gascoyne-Cecil, 3rd Marquess of Salisbury**	First Lord of the Treasury	1886–1887
	Salisbury lived at his home at 20 Arlington Street in St James's in 1887–92 and 1895–1902.	
William Henry Smith	First Lord of the Treasury	1887–1891
Arthur Balfour	First Lord of the Treasury	1891–1892
**William Ewart Gladstone**	First Lord of the Treasury, Lord Privy Seal	1892–1894
**Archibald Primrose, 5th Earl of Rosebery**	First Lord of the Treasury, Lord President of the Council	1894–1895
Arthur Balfour	First Lord of the Treasury, Leader of the House of Commons	1895–1902
	Since 1902, every Prime Minister has officially resided in Number 10 although several actually lived elsewhere as noted below. Also, since then, all have held the official legal office of First Lord of the Treasury; none have held the post of Chancellor of the Exchequer while PM as was often the case previously, with the exception of Stanley Baldwin between May and August 1923.	
**Arthur Balfour**	First Lord of the Treasury	1902–1905
**Sir Henry Campbell-Bannerman**	First Lord of the Treasury	1905–1907
**H. H. Asquith**	First Lord of the Treasury (and Secretary of State for War: January–August 1914)	1907–1916
**David Lloyd George**	First Lord of the Treasury	1916–1922
**Bonar Law**	First Lord of the Treasury	1922–1923
**Stanley Baldwin**	First Lord of the Treasury (and Chancellor of the Exchequer: May–August 1923)	1923–1924
**Ramsay MacDonald**	First Lord of the Treasury and Foreign Secretary	1924
**Stanley Baldwin**	First Lord of the Treasury	1924–1929
**Ramsay MacDonald**	First Lord of the Treasury	1929–1935
**Stanley Baldwin**	First Lord of the Treasury	1935–1937
**Neville Chamberlain**	First Lord of the Treasury	1937–1940
**Winston Churchill**	First Lord of the Treasury, Minister of Defence	1940–1945
	For his safety, Churchill lived in the heavily bunkered Annex of Number 10 during most of the Second World War. However, he did insist on using Number 10 for work and dining.	
**Clement Attlee**	First Lord of the Treasury	1945–1951
**Sir Winston Churchill**	First Lord of the Treasury	1951–1955
**Sir Anthony Eden**	First Lord of the Treasury	1955–1956
**Harold Macmillan**	First Lord of the Treasury	1957–1960
	Macmillan lived in Admiralty House from 1960 to 1964 while Number 10 was restored. Completely gutted, and carefully dismantled, the house was then meticulously rebuilt on deep foundations using as much of the original materials as possible.	
**Sir Alec Douglas-Home**	First Lord of the Treasury	1964
**Harold Wilson**	First Lord of the Treasury, Minister for the Civil Service	1964–1970
**Edward Heath**	First Lord of the Treasury, Minister for the Civil Service	1970–1974
**Harold Wilson**	First Lord of the Treasury, Minister for the Civil Service	1974–1976
	During his second ministry, Wilson maintained the public illusion of living in Number 10 even though he actually lived in his house at 5 Lord North Street in Westminster.	
**James Callaghan**	First Lord of the Treasury, Minister for the Civil Service	1976–1979
**Margaret Thatcher**	First Lord of the Treasury, Minister for the Civil Service	1979–1990
**John Major**	First Lord of the Treasury, Minister for the Civil Service	1990–1997
	In 1991, the Provisional IRA launched a mortar bomb at Number 10, blowing out windows and leaving a large crater in the back yard. Major vacated the house during repairs.	
**Tony Blair**	First Lord of the Treasury, Minister for the Civil Service	1997–2007
	Shortly after taking office in 1997, Blair agreed to swap apartments with his Chancellor, Gordon Brown, since the flat at Number 11 was larger and more suited to his larger family. Brown remained at Number 10 after he succeeded to the premiership in 2007, thus spending a full calendar decade, the 2000s, resident in the house, as Thatcher had done in the 1980s.	
**Gordon Brown**	Chancellor of the Exchequer (1997–2007); First Lord of the Treasury, Minister for the Civil Service (2007–2010)	2007–2010
**David Cameron**	First Lord of the Treasury, Minister for the Civil Service	2010–2016
	Cameron agreed to swap apartments with his Chancellor, George Osborne, for similar reasons to Blair.	
**Theresa May**	First Lord of the Treasury, Minister for the Civil Service	2016–2019
	May chose to live in Number 11 while her Chancellor, Philip Hammond, resided at Number 10.	
**Boris Johnson**	First Lord of the Treasury, Minister for the Civil Service, Minister for the Union	2019–2022
	Prime Minister Boris Johnson lived in the flat above Number 11, while his first Chancellor Sajid Javid lived in Number 10.	
**Liz Truss**	First Lord of the Treasury, Minister for the Civil Service, Minister for the Union	2022
**Rishi Sunak**	First Lord of the Treasury, Minister for the Civil Service, Minister for the Union	2022–2024
	In a break with recent tradition, Prime Minister Rishi Sunak moved into the Number 10 flat where he previously resided as Chancellor, while his Chancellor Jeremy Hunt moved into the Number 11 flat.	
**Sir Keir Starmer**	First Lord of the Treasury, Minister for the Civil Service, Minister for the Union	2024–2026
	Starmer chose to live in the flat above Number 11 while his Chancellor, Rachel Reeves, resided at Number 10.	
**Andy Burnham**	First Lord of the Treasury, Minister for the Civil Service, Minister for the Union	2026–present

== See also ==
- Downing Street
- Chief Mouser to the Cabinet Office
