= 10 Downing Street =

Residence and office of the UK prime minister

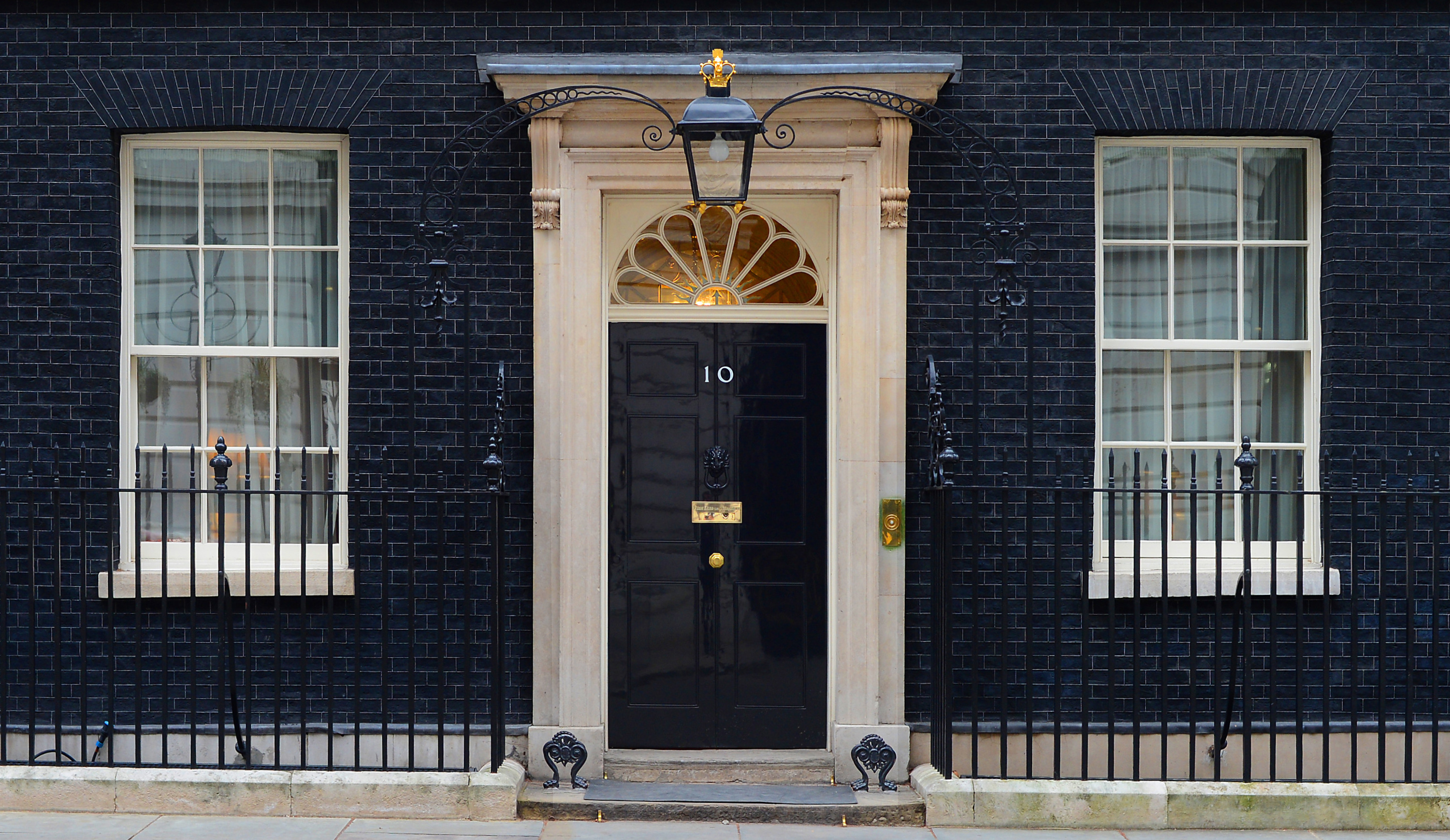

- Location within City of Westminster

General information
- Architectural style: Georgian
- Location: City of Westminster, London, SW1, United Kingdom
- Coordinates: 51°30′12″N 0°07′39″W
- Current tenants: Andy Burnham (Prime Minister), Marie-France van Heel (Spouse of the Prime Minister) and family Larry (Chief Mouser to the Cabinet Office)

Listed Building – Grade I
- Official name: 10 Downing Street, SW1A 2AA
- Designated: 14 January 1970
- Reference no.: 1210759
- Construction started: 1682; 344 years ago
- Completed: 1684; 342 years ago

Design and construction
- Architect: Christopher Wren

10 Downing Street in London is the official residence and office of the prime minister of the United Kingdom, as the first lord of the treasury. Colloquially known as Number 10, the building is located in Downing Street, off Whitehall in the City of Westminster.

It is over 300 years old, is a Grade I listed building, and contains approximately 100 rooms. A private residence for the prime minister occupies the third floor and there is a kitchen in the basement. The other floors contain offices and conference, reception, sitting and dining rooms where the prime minister works, and where government ministers, national leaders, and foreign dignitaries are met and hosted. At the rear is an interior courtyard and a terrace overlooking a 1/2-acre (0.2 ha) garden. Number 10 is adjacent to St James's Park, approximately 3/4 mile (1.2 km) from Buckingham Palace, the official residence of the British monarch in London, and is near the Palace of Westminster, the meeting place of both Houses of Parliament.

Originally three houses, Number 10 was offered to Robert Walpole by King George II in 1732. Walpole accepted on the condition that the gift was to the office of First Lord of the Treasury, rather than to himself personally. The post of First Lord of the Treasury has, for much of the 18th and 19th centuries and invariably since 1905, been held by the prime minister. Walpole commissioned William Kent to join the three houses and it is this larger house that is known as Number 10 Downing Street.

Despite its size and convenient location near to Parliament, few early prime ministers lived at 10 Downing Street. Costly to maintain, neglected, and run-down, Number 10 was scheduled to be demolished several times, but the property survived and became linked with many statesmen and events in British history. In 1985 Prime Minister Margaret Thatcher said Number 10 had become "one of the most precious jewels in the national heritage".

The Prime Minister's Office, for which the terms Downing Street and Number 10 are metonyms, lies within the 10 Downing Street building and is part of the Cabinet Office. It is staffed by civil servants and special advisers.

10 Downing Street is property of His Majesty's Government. Its registered legal title is held in the name of the secretary of state for housing, communities and local government, and the secretary of state is a corporation sole.

== History of the building ==
=== Original Number 10 ===
Number 10 Downing Street was originally three properties: a mansion overlooking St James's Park called "the House at the Back", a town house behind it, and a cottage. The town house, from which the modern building gets its name, was one of several built by Sir George Downing, 1st Baronet between 1682 and 1684.

Downing, a noted spy for Oliver Cromwell and later King Charles II, invested in property and acquired considerable wealth. In 1654, he purchased the lease on land south of St James's Park, adjacent to the House at the Back within walking distance of parliament. Downing planned to build a row of terraced town houses "for persons of good quality to inhabit in ..." The street on which he built them now bears his name, and the largest became part of Number 10 Downing Street.

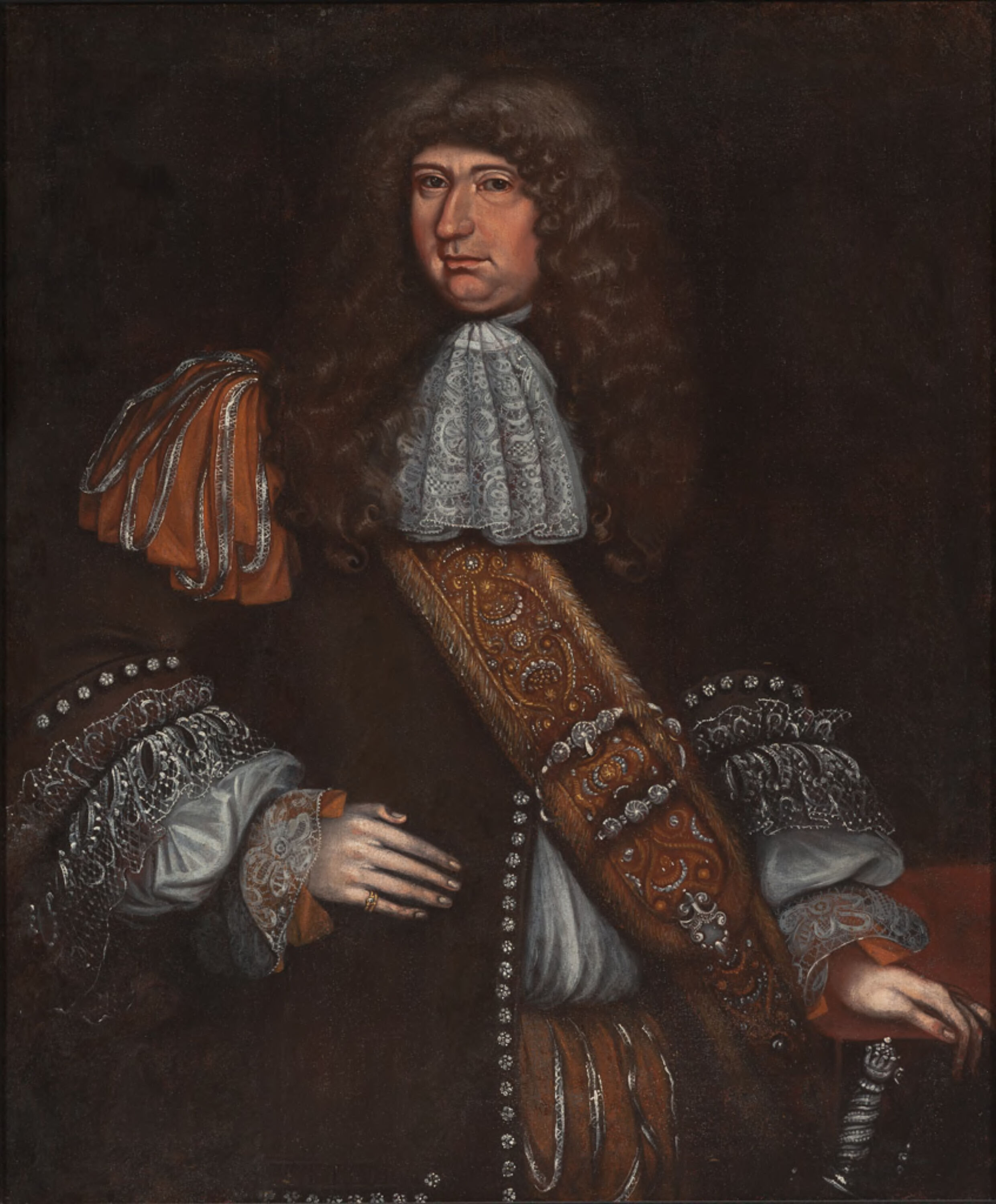
Possible portrait of Sir George Downing by Thomas Smith, painted between c. 1675–1690

Straightforward as the investment seemed, it proved otherwise. The Hampden family had a lease on the land that they refused to relinquish. Downing fought their claim, but failed and had to wait 30 years before he could build. When the Hampden lease expired, Downing received permission to build on land further west to take advantage of more recent property developments. The new warrant issued in 1682 reads: "Sir George Downing ... [is authorised] to build new and more houses ... subject to the proviso that it be not built any nearer than 14 feet of the wall of the said Park at the West end thereof". Between 1682 and 1684, Downing built a cul-de-sac of two-storey town houses with coach-houses, stables and views of St James's Park. Over the years, the addresses changed several times. In 1787, Number 5 became "Number 10".

Downing employed Christopher Wren to design the houses. Although large, they were put up quickly and cheaply on soft soil with shallow foundations. Winston Churchill wrote that Number 10 was "shaky and lightly built by the profiteering contractor whose name they bear".

The upper end of the Downing Street cul-de-sac closed off the access to St James's Park, making the street quiet and private. An advertisement in 1720 described it as "a pretty open Place, especially at the upper end, where are four or five very large and well-built Houses, fit for Persons of Honour and Quality; each House having a pleasant Prospect into St James's Park, with a Tarras Walk". The cul-de-sac had several distinguished residents: George Granville, 1st Baron Lansdowne from 1692 to 1696 and the Earl of Grantham from 1699 to 1703.

Downing did not live in Downing Street. In 1675, he retired to Cambridge, where he died in 1684, a few months after building was completed. In 1800, the wealth he had accumulated was used to found Downing College, Cambridge, as had been his wish should his descendants fail in the male line. Downing's portrait hangs in the entrance hall of Number 10.

=== History of the "House at the Back" before 1733 ===
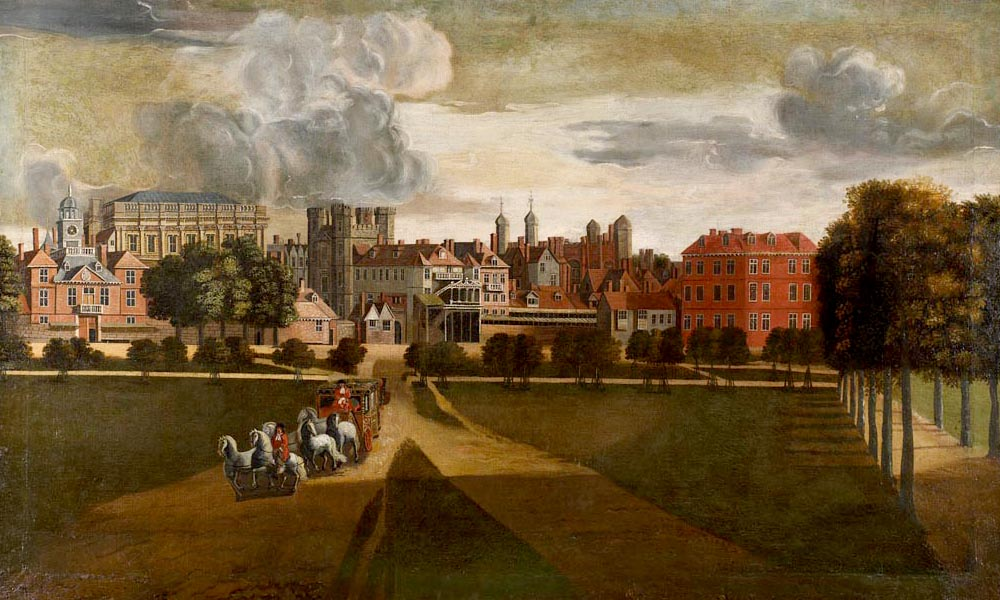
The Palace of Whitehall by Hendrick Danckerts c. 1660–1679. Viewed from St James's Park, the "House at the Back" is on the right; the octagonal building next to it is the Cockpit.

The "House at the Back", the largest of the three houses which were combined to make Number 10, was a mansion built in about 1530 next to the Palace of Whitehall. Rebuilt, expanded, and renovated many times since, it was originally one of several buildings that made up the "Cockpit Lodgings", so-called because they were attached to an octagonal structure used for cock-fighting. Early in the 17th century, the Cockpit was converted to a concert hall and theatre; after the Glorious Revolution of 1688, some of the first cabinet meetings were held there secretly.

For many years, the "House at the Back" was the home of Thomas Knyvet, Keeper of Whitehall Palace, famous for capturing Guy Fawkes in 1605 and foiling his plot to assassinate King James I. The previous year, Knyvet had moved into a house next door, approximately where Number 10 is today.

From that time, the "House at the Back" was usually occupied by members of the royal family or the government. Princess Elizabeth, eldest daughter of King James I, lived there from 1604 until 1613 when she married Frederick V, Elector Palatine and moved to Heidelberg. She was the grandmother of King George I, the Elector of Hanover, who became King of Great Britain in 1714, and was a great-grandmother of King George II, who presented the house to Walpole in 1732.

George Monck, 1st Duke of Albemarle, the general responsible for the Restoration of the Monarchy in 1660, lived there from 1660 until his death in 1671. As head of the Great Treasury Commission of 1667–1672, Albemarle transformed accounting methods and allowed the Crown greater control over expenses. His secretary, George Downing, who built Downing Street, is thought to have created these changes. Albemarle is the first treasury minister to have lived in what became the home of the First Lord of the Treasury and prime minister.

In 1671, George Villiers, 2nd Duke of Buckingham took possession when he joined the Cabal Ministry. At considerable expense, Buckingham rebuilt the house. The result was a spacious mansion, lying parallel to Whitehall Palace with a view of St James Park from its garden.

After Buckingham retired in 1676, Lady Charlotte Fitzroy, Charles II's daughter, moved in when she married Edward Lee, 1st Earl of Lichfield. The Crown authorised extensive rebuilding which included adding a storey, thus giving it three main floors, an attic and basement. This structure can be seen today as the rear section of Number 10. (See Plan of the Premises Granted to the Earl and Countess of Lichfield in 1677) The likely reason that repair was required is that the house had settled in the swampy ground near the Thames, causing structural damage. Like Downing Street, it rested on a shallow foundation, a design error that caused problems until 1960 when the modern Number 10 was rebuilt on deep pilings.

The Lichfields followed James II into exile after the Glorious Revolution. Two years later in 1690, William III and Mary II gave the "House at the Back" to Hendrik van Nassau-Ouwerkerk, a Dutch general who had assisted in securing the Crown for the Prince of Orange. Nassau, who Anglicised his name to "Overkirk", lived there until his death in 1708.

The "House at the Back" reverted to the Crown when Lady Overkirk died in 1720. The Treasury issued an order "for repairing and fitting it up in the best and most substantial manner" at a cost of £2,522. The work included: "The Back passage into Downing street to be repaired and a new door; a New Necessary House to be made; To take down the Useless passage formerly made for the Maids of Honour to go into Downing Street, when the Queen lived at the Cockpit; To New Cast a great Lead Cistern & pipes and to lay the Water into the house & a new frame for ye Cistern".

The name of the "House at the Back" changed with the occupant, from Lichfield House to Overkirk House in 1690 to Bothmer House in 1720.

=== First politician and "head of government" in the house ===
Johann Caspar von Bothmer, Premier Minister of the Electorate of Hanover, head of the German Chancery and adviser to George I and II, took up residency in 1720. Although Bothmer complained about "the ruinous Condition of the Premises", he lived there until his death in 1732. Even though Count von Bothmer was not British, he was a subject of George I and George II and the first politician and head of a government who resided in 10 Downing Street.

=== First Lord's house: 1733–1735 ===
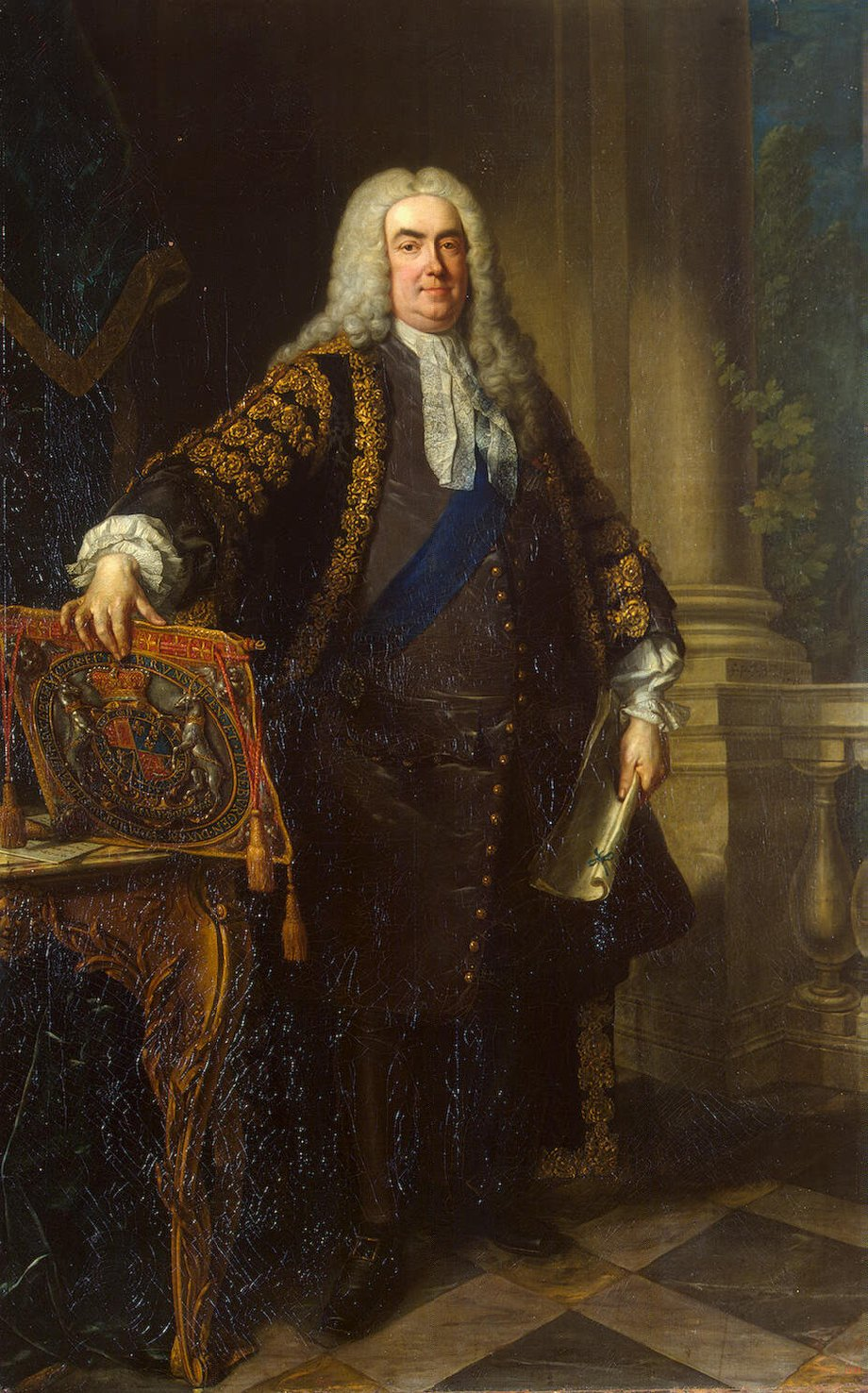
Robert Walpole accepted George II's gift of the house at the back and two Downing Street houses on behalf of the office of First Lord of the Treasury.

When Count Bothmer died, ownership of the "House at the Back" reverted to the Crown. George II took this opportunity to offer it to Robert Walpole, often called the first prime minister, as a gift for his services to the nation: stabilising its finances, keeping it at peace and securing the Hanoverian succession.

Walpole did not accept the gift for himself. He proposed – and the King agreed – that the Crown give the properties to the Office of First Lord of the Treasury. Walpole would live there as the incumbent First Lord, but would vacate it for the next one.

To enlarge the new house, Walpole persuaded one Mr. Chicken, the tenant of a cottage next door, to move to another house in Downing Street. This small house and the mansion at the back were then incorporated into Number 10. Walpole commissioned William Kent to convert them into one building. Kent joined the larger houses by building a two-storey structure between them, consisting of one long room on the ground floor and several above. The remaining interior space was converted into a courtyard. He connected the Downing Street houses with a corridor. Having united the structures, Kent gutted and rebuilt the interior. He then surmounted the third storey of the house at the back with a pediment. To allow Walpole quicker access to Parliament, Kent closed the north side entrance from St James's Park, and made the door in Downing Street the main entrance.

The rebuilding took three years. On 23 September 1735, the London Daily Post announced that: "Yesterday the Right Hon. Sir Robert Walpole, with his Lady and Family, removed from their House in St James's Square, to his new House, adjoining to the Treasury in St James's Park". The cost of conversion is unknown. Originally estimated at £8,000, the final cost probably exceeded £20,000.

Walpole did not enter through the now-famous door; that would not be installed until forty years later. Kent's door was modest, belying the spacious elegance beyond. The First Lord's new, albeit temporary, home had sixty rooms, with hardwood and marble floors, cornices, elegant pillars and marble mantelpieces; those on the west side with views of St James's Park. One of the largest rooms was a study measuring forty feet by twenty with enormous windows overlooking St James's Park. "My Lord's Study" (as Kent labelled it in his drawings) would later become the Cabinet Room where prime ministers meet with the Cabinet ministers.

Shortly after moving in, Walpole ordered that a portion of the land outside his study be converted into a terrace and garden. Letters patent issued in April 1736 state that: "... a piece of garden ground situated in his Majesty's park of St James's, & belonging & adjoining to the house now inhabited by the Right Honourable the Chancellor of His Majesty's Exchequer, hath been lately made & fitted up at the Charge ... of the Crown".

The same document confirmed that Number 10 Downing Street was: "meant to be annexed & united to the Office of his Majesty's Treasury & to be & to remain for the Use & Habitation of the first Commissioner of his Majesty's Treasury for the time being".

=== 10 Downing Street and Kent's Treasury Building ===
At about the same time that William Kent was combining the Downing Street townhouse with the house at the back, he was also commissioned to design and construct a new Treasury building on the site of the old Tudor Cockpit located behind Downing Street. This project was completed in 1737 and included corridors connecting the Treasury building with 10 Downing Street allowing Walpole, as Chancellor of the Exchequer as well as First Lord of the Treasury, direct and convenient access to the Treasury offices. In effect the Treasury building became an annex of 10 Downing Street and its staff worked directly for Walpole on treasury, patronage and other public business. This arrangement remained in effect until the middle of the 19th century and until then all prime ministers who were also Chancellor took advantage of it. After Prime Minister Robert Peel "gave up" being Chancellor in 1841, and this separation of positions gradually became a convention of the constitution, a locked door was installed between the buildings limiting the Prime Minister's access to the Treasury and its staff. Due to bomb damage in 1940, the Treasury relocated to the Government Offices Great George Street. Then in 1963 the Cabinet Office (including the Prime Minister's Office) and later the Civil Service (with the Prime minister as Minister for the Civil Service) moved into the renovated Kent Treasury Building. "Under (Prime Minister) Blair . . . the locked door, symbolically and physically dividing No. 10 from the Cabinet Office, was passed through with such frequency that its meaning was lost."

=== A "vast, awkward house": 1735–1902 ===
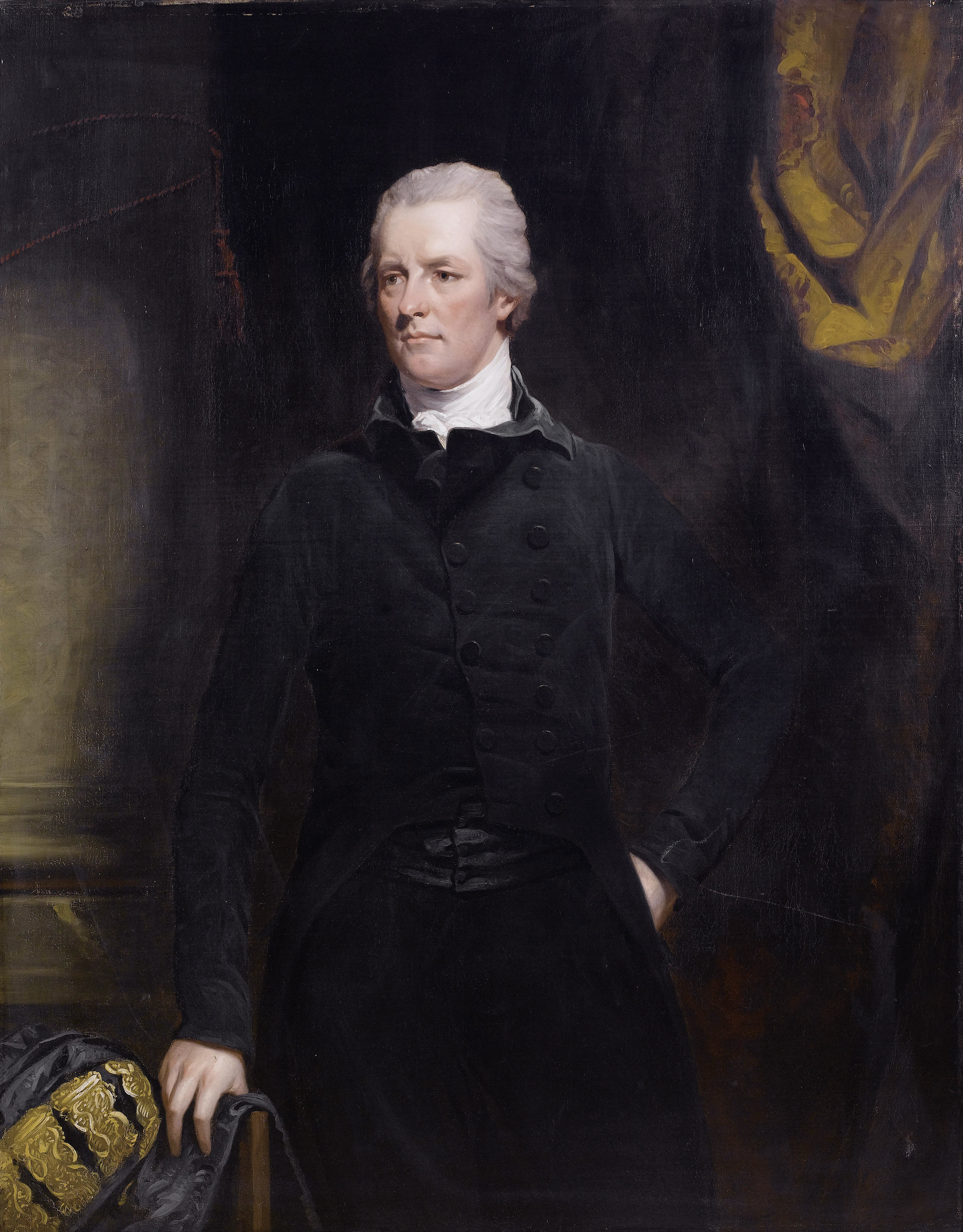
William Pitt the Younger lived in Number 10 for twenty years, longer than any Prime Minister before or since.

Walpole lived in Number 10 until 1742. Although he had accepted it on behalf of future First Lords of the Treasury, it would be 21 years before any of his successors chose to live there; the five who followed Walpole preferred their own homes. This was the pattern until the beginning of the 20th century. Of the 31 First Lords from 1735 to 1902, only 16 (including Walpole) lived in Number 10.

One reason many First Lords chose not to live in Number 10 was that most of them owned London town houses that were superior in size and quality. To them, Number 10 was unimpressive. Their possession of the house, albeit temporary, was a perquisite they could bestow as a political reward. Most lent it to the Chancellor of the Exchequer, others to lesser officials or to friends and relatives. (Note: At the end of the 19th century, Lord Salisbury, the last Prime Minister not to concurrently hold the post of First Lord of the Treasury, lived in his town house on Arlington Street. During Salisbury's last ministry from 1895 to 1902, the First Lord was his nephew and successor Arthur Balfour, the Leader of the House of Commons; it was thus Balfour who resided in Number 10 in this time.)

Another reason for its unpopularity was that Number 10 was a hazardous place in which to live; it was prone to sinking because it was built on soft soil and a shallow foundation, and its floors buckled and walls and chimneys cracked. It became unsafe and frequently required repairs. In 1766, for example, Charles Townshend, Chancellor of the Exchequer, pointed out that the house was in a dilapidated condition. His architect's letter to the Treasury stated: "...we have caused the House in Downing Street belonging to the Treasury to be surveyed, & find the Walls of the old part of the said House next the street to be much decayed, the Floors & Chimneys much sunk from the level". Townshend ordered extensive repairs, which were still incomplete eight years later. A note from Lord North to the Office of Works, dated September 1774, asks for the work on the front of the house, "which was begun by a Warrant from the Treasury dated 9 August 1766", to be finished.

Treasury officials complained that the building was costing too much to maintain; some suggested that it should be razed and a new house constructed on the site or elsewhere. In 1782 the Board of Works reporting on "the dangerous state of the old part of the House", stated that "no time be lost in taking down said building". In 1783 the Duke of Portland moved out because it was once again in need of repair. A committee found that the money spent so far was insufficient. This time the Board of Works declared that "the Repairs, Alterations & Additions at the Chancellor of the Exchequer's House will amount to the sum of £5,580, exclusive of the sum for which they already have His Majesty's Warrant. And praying a Warrant for the said sum of £5,580 – and also praying an Imprest of that sum to enable them to pay the Workmen". This proved to be a gross underestimate; the final bill was over £11,000. The Morning Herald fumed about the expense:

£500 pounds p.a. preceding the Great Repair, and £11,000 the Great Repair itself! So much has this extraordinary edifice cost the country – For one moiety of the sum a much better dwelling might have been purchased!

A few prime ministers however did enjoy living in Number 10. Lord North, who conducted the war against the American Revolution, lived there happily with his family from 1767 to 1782. William Pitt the Younger, who made it his home for twenty years (longer than any First Lord before or since) from 1783 to 1801 and from 1804 to 1806, referred to it as "My vast, awkward house". While there, Pitt reduced the national debt, formed the Triple Alliance against France and won passage of the Act of Union that created the United Kingdom of Great Britain and Ireland. F. J. Robinson, 1st Viscount Goderich, took a special liking to the house in the late 1820s and spent state funds lavishly remodelling the interior.

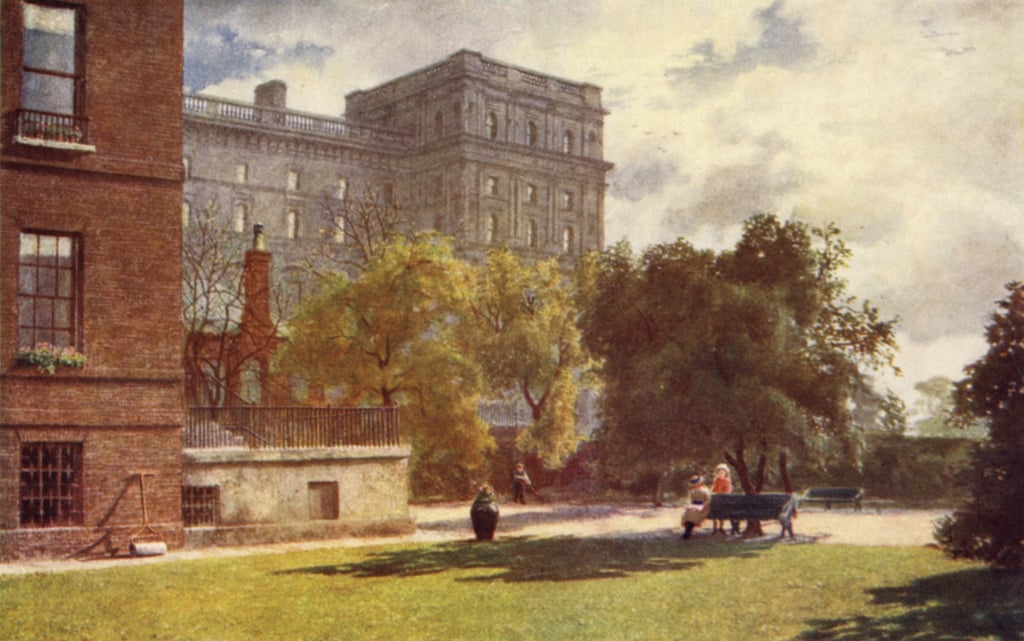
No 10 Downing Street, 1888 by Philip Norman

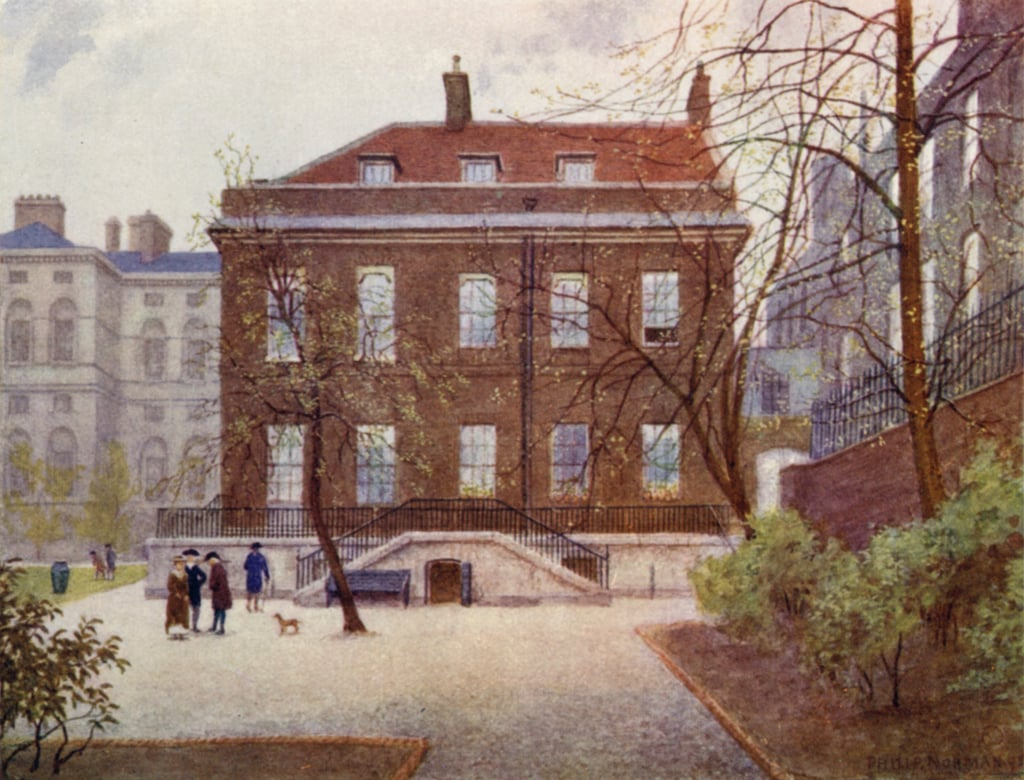
Garden of No 10 Downing Street, 1888 by Philip Norman

Nevertheless, for 70 years following Pitt's death in 1806, Number 10 was rarely used as the First Lord's residence. From 1834 to 1877, it was either vacant or used only for offices and meetings.

Downing Street declined at the turn of the 19th century, becoming surrounded with run-down buildings, dark alleys, the scene of crime and prostitution. Earlier, the government had taken over the other Downing Street houses: the Colonial Office occupied Number 14 in 1798; the Foreign Office was at Number 16 and the houses on either side; the West India Department was in Number 18; and the Tithe Commissioners in Number 20. The houses deteriorated from neglect, became unsafe, and one by one were demolished. By 1857 Downing Street's townhouses were all gone except for Number 10, Number 11 (customarily the Chancellor of the Exchequer's residence), and Number 12 (used as offices for Government Whips). In 1879 a fire destroyed the upper floors of Number 12; it was renovated but only as a single-storey structure.

=== Revival and recognition: 1902–1960 ===
When Lord Salisbury retired in 1902, his nephew, Arthur James Balfour, became prime minister. It was an easy transition: he was already First Lord of the Treasury and he was already living in Number 10. Balfour revived the custom that Number 10 is the First Lord and Prime Minister's official residence.

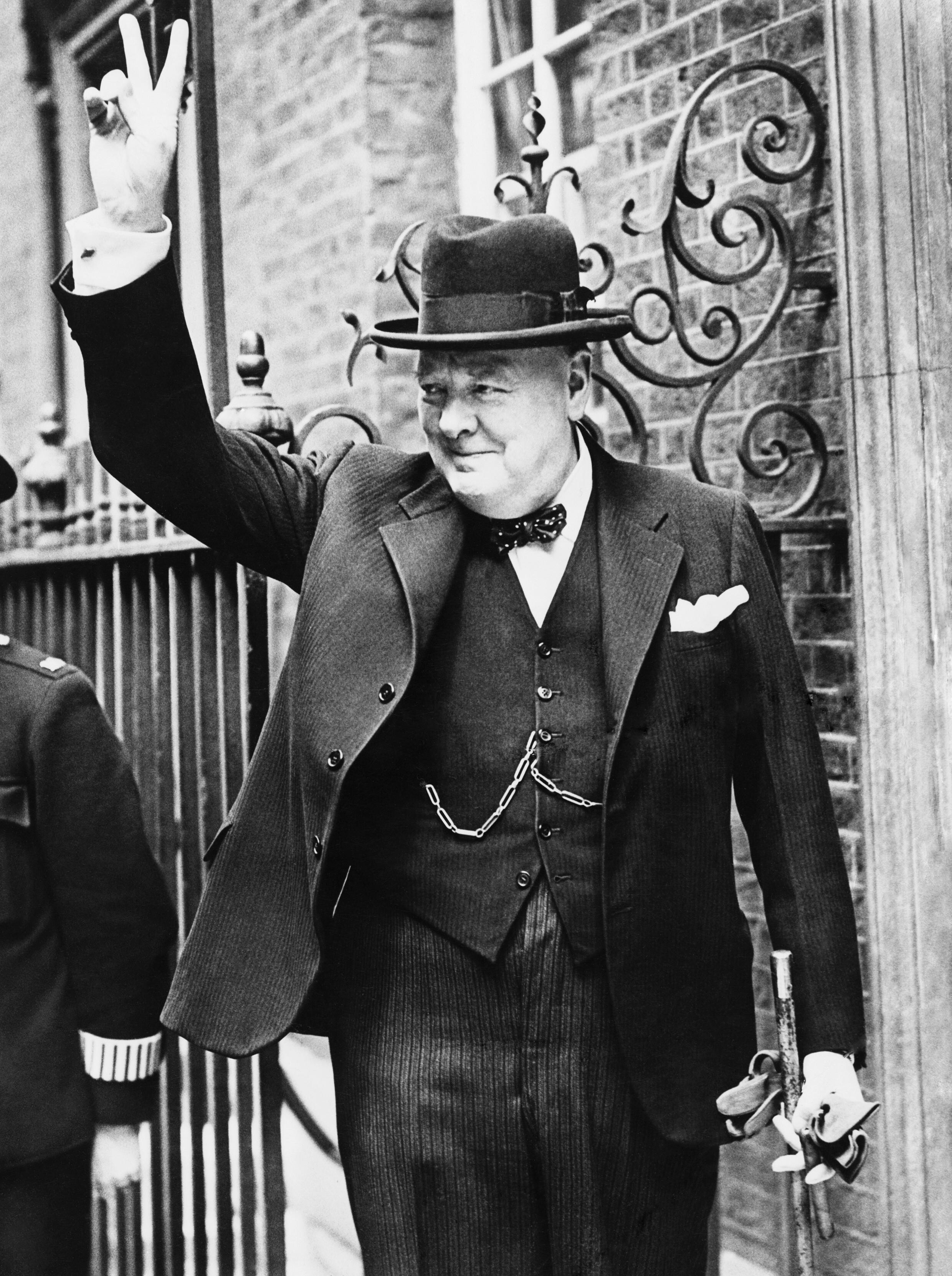
Winston Churchill emerging from Number 10 in 1943

Without a bomb shelter, during World War II the Prime Minister abandoned Number 10 instead using a flat in the Foreign office that became known as the No.10 Annexe, and lay above the much more comprehensive underground bunker used by Winston Churchill and now known as the Churchill War Rooms. To reassure the people that his government was functioning normally, he insisted on being seen entering and leaving Number 10 occasionally, and indeed, continued to use it for meetings and dinners despite being urged not to. Harold Wilson, during his second ministry from 1974 to 1976, lived in his home in Lord North Street because Mary Wilson wanted "a proper home".

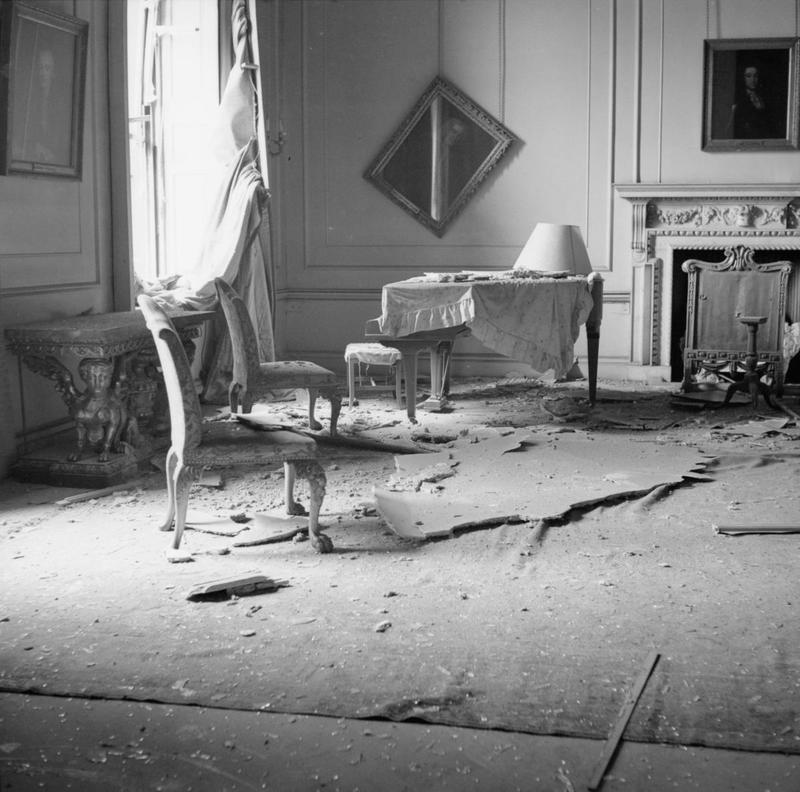
The damaged drawing room of 10 Downing Street following a bomb raid in February 1944

Despite these exceptions, Number 10 has been known as the prime minister's official home for over one hundred years. By the turn of the 20th century, photography and the penny press had linked Number 10 in the public mind with the premiership. The introduction of films and television would strengthen this association. Pictures of prime ministers with distinguished guests at the door became commonplace. With or without the prime minister present, visitors had their picture taken. Suffragettes posed in front of the door when they petitioned H. H. Asquith for women's rights in 1913, a picture that became famous and was circulated around the world. In 1931, Mahatma Gandhi, wearing a traditional homespun dhoti, posed leaving Number 10 after meeting with Ramsay MacDonald to discuss India's independence. This picture, too, became famous, especially in India. The freedom fighters could see their leader had been received in the prime minister's home. Couse's elegant, understated door – stark black, framed in cream white with a bold white "10" clearly visible – was the perfect backdrop to record such events. Prime Ministers made historic announcements from the front step. Waving the Anglo-German Agreement of Friendship, Neville Chamberlain proclaimed "Peace with honour" in 1938 from Number 10 after his meeting with Adolf Hitler in Munich. During World War II, Churchill was photographed many times emerging confidently from Number 10 holding up two fingers in the sign for "Victory". The building itself, however, did not escape the London Blitz entirely unscathed; in February 1944 a bomb fell on nearby Horse Guards Parade and some of the drawing-room windows were destroyed.

The symbol of British government, Number 10 became a gathering place for protesters. Emmeline Pankhurst and other suffragette leaders stormed Downing Street in 1908; anti-Vietnam War protestors marched there in the 1960s, as did anti-Iraq War protestors in 2005.

=== Rebuilding: 1960–1990 ===
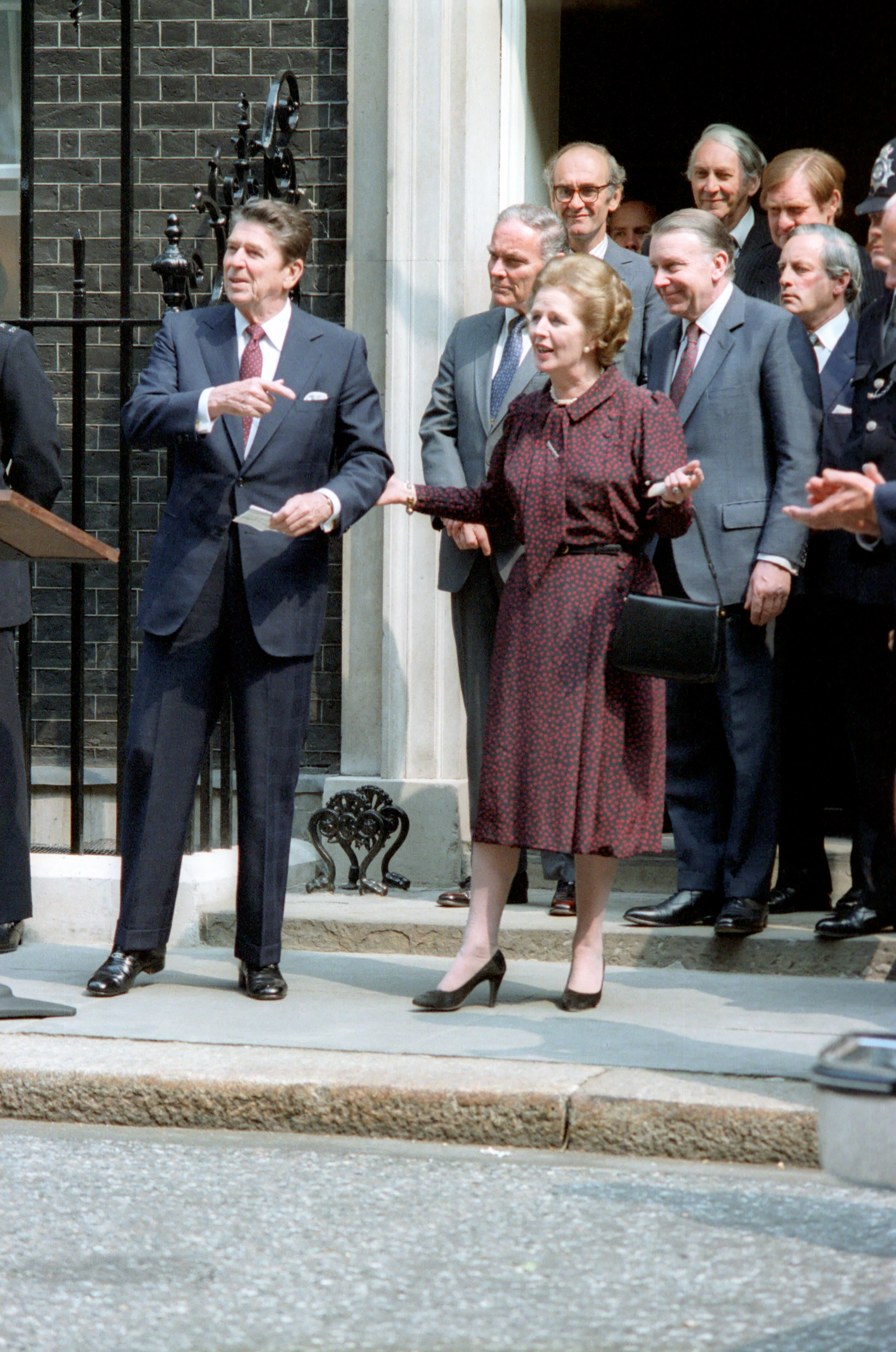
Prime Minister Margaret Thatcher and US president Ronald Reagan at 10 Downing Street in 1982

By the middle of the 20th century, Number 10 was falling apart again. The deterioration had been obvious for some time. The number of people allowed in the upper floors was limited for fear the bearing walls would collapse. The staircase had sunk several inches; some steps were buckled and the balustrade was out of alignment. Dry rot was widespread throughout. The interior wood in the Cabinet Room's double columns was like sawdust. Skirting boards, doors, sills and other woodwork were riddled and weakened with disease. After reconstruction had begun, miners dug down into the foundations and found that the huge wooden beams supporting the house had decayed.

In 1958, a committee under the chairmanship of the Earl of Crawford and Balcarres was appointed by Harold Macmillan to investigate the condition of the house and make recommendations. In the committee's report there was some discussion of tearing down the building and constructing an entirely new residence but because the prime minister's home had become an icon of British architecture like Windsor Castle, Buckingham Palace and the Houses of Parliament, the committee recommended that Number 10 (and Numbers 11 and 12) should be rebuilt using as much of the original materials as possible. The interior would be photographed, measured, disassembled, and restored. A new foundation with deep piles would be laid and the original buildings reassembled on top of it, allowing for much needed expansion and modernisation. Any original materials that were beyond repair – such as the pair of double columns in the Cabinet Room – would be replicated in detail. This was a formidable undertaking: the three buildings contained over 200 rooms spread out over five floors.

The architect Raymond Erith carried out the design for this painstaking work and the contractor that undertook it was John Mowlem & Co. The Times reported initially that the cost for the project would be £400,000. After more careful studies were completed, it was concluded that the "total cost was likely to be £1,250,000" and the work would take two years to complete. In the end, the cost was close to £3,000,000 and the work took almost three years due in large part to 14 labour strikes. There were also delays when archaeological excavations uncovered important artefacts dating from Roman, Saxon and medieval times. Macmillan lived in Admiralty House during the reconstruction.

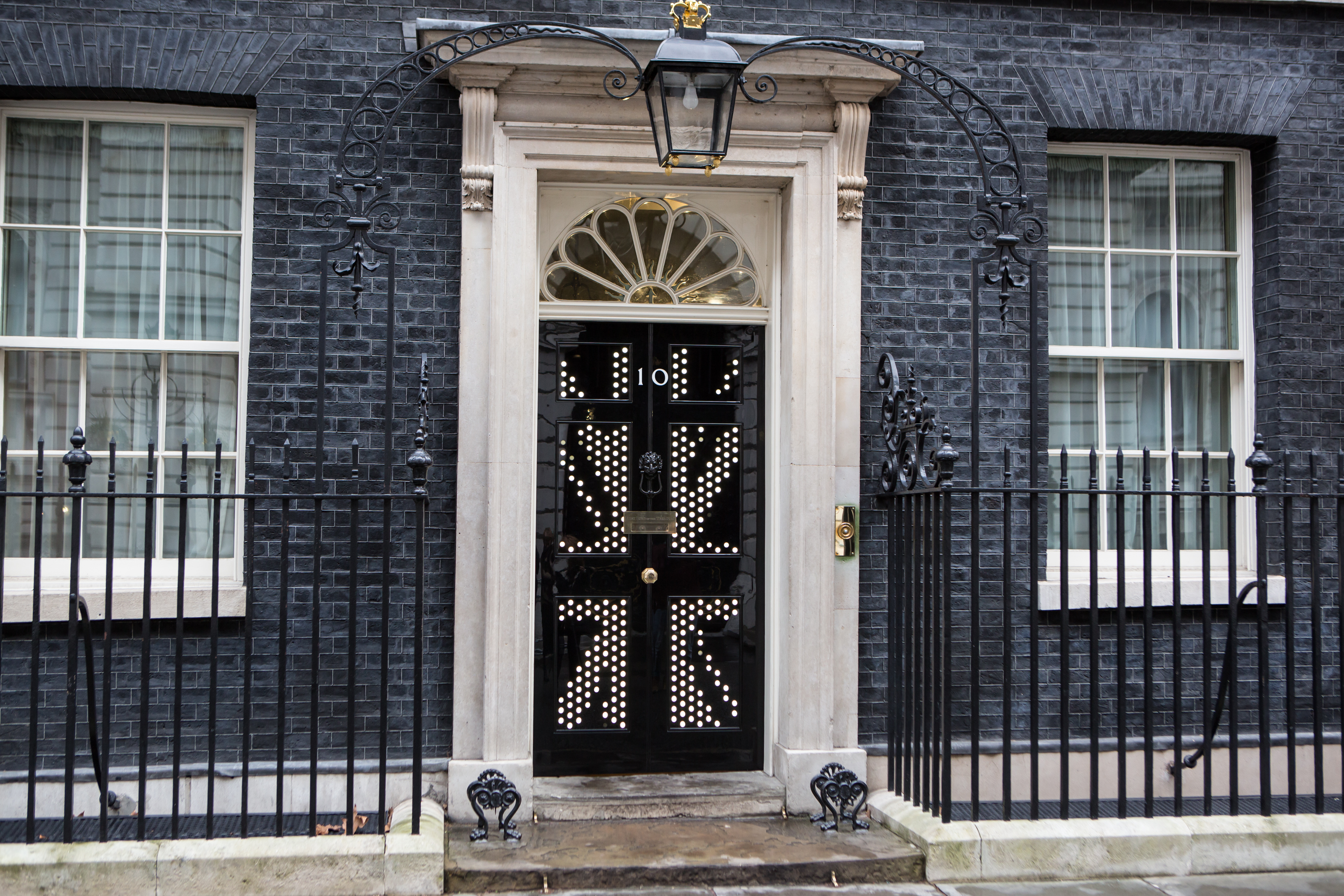
The replica of the door with the Union Flag decoration in 2015

The new foundation was made of steel-reinforced concrete with pilings sunk 6 to 18 feet (1.8 to 5.5 m). The "new" Number 10 consisted of about 60% new materials; the remaining 40% was either restored or replicas of originals. Many rooms and sections of the new building were reconstructed exactly as they were in the old Number 10. These included: the garden floor, the door and entrance foyer, the stairway, the hallway to the Cabinet Room, the Cabinet Room, the garden and terrace, the Small and Large State Rooms and the three reception rooms. The staircase, however, was rebuilt and simplified. Steel was hidden inside the columns in the Pillared Drawing Room to support the floor above. The upper floors were modernised and the third floor extended over Numbers 11 and 12 to allow more living space. As many as 40 coats of paint were stripped from the elaborate cornices in the main rooms revealing details unseen for almost 200 years in some cases.

When builders examined the exterior façade, they discovered that the black colour visible even in photographs from the mid-19th century was misleading; the bricks were actually yellow. The black appearance was the product of two centuries of pollution. To preserve the 'traditional' look of recent times, the newly cleaned yellow bricks were painted black to resemble their well-known appearance.

Although the reconstruction was generally considered an architectural triumph, Erith was disappointed. He complained openly during and after the project that the government had altered his design to save money. "I am heart broken by the result," he said. "The whole project has been a frightful waste of money because it just has not been done properly. The Ministry of Works has insisted on economy after economy. I am bitterly disappointed with what has happened." Erith described the numbers on the front, intended to be based on historical models, as 'a mess' and 'completely wrong' to a fellow historian.

Erith's concerns proved justified. Within a few years, dry rot was discovered, especially in the main rooms due to inadequate waterproofing and a broken water pipe. Extensive reconstruction again had to be undertaken in the late 1960s to resolve these problems. Further extensive repairs and remodelling, commissioned by Margaret Thatcher, were completed in the 1980s under the direction of Erith's associate Quinlan Terry.

=== 1990–present ===
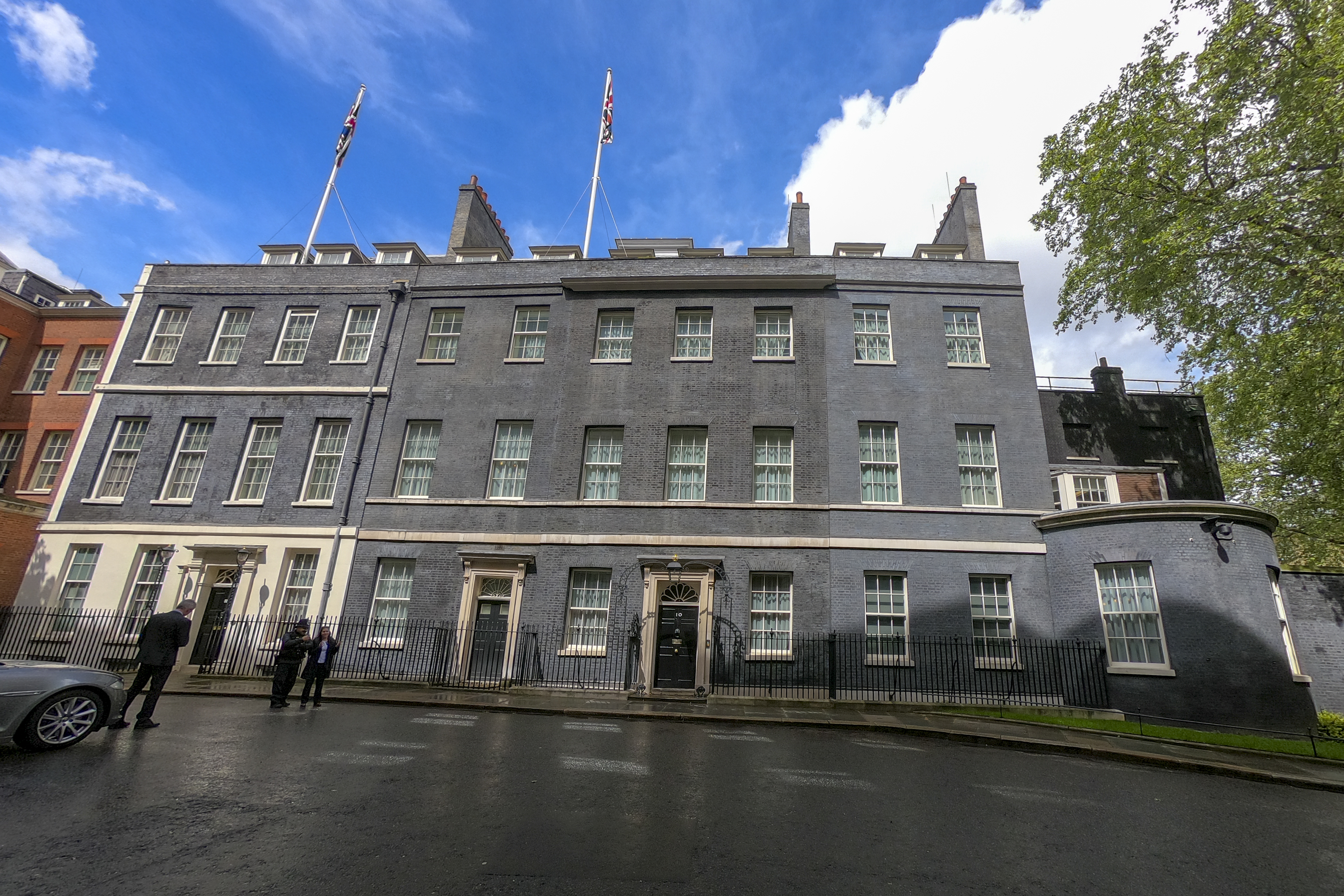
The entire building of 10 Downing Street, 2019

The work done by Erith and Terry in the 1960s and 1980s represents the most extensive remodelling of Number 10 in recent times. Since 1990 when the Terry reconstruction was completed, repairing, redecorating, remodelling, and updating the house has been ongoing as needed. The IRA mortar attack in February 1991 led to extensive work being done to repair the damage (mostly to the garden and exterior walls) and to improve security. In the summer of 1993 windows were rebuilt and in 1995 computer cables installed. In 1997, the building was remodelled to provide extra space for the prime minister's greatly increased staff.

To accommodate their large families, both Tony Blair and David Cameron chose to live in the private residence above Number 11 rather than the smaller one above Number 10. In 2010, the Camerons completely modernised the 50-year-old private kitchen in Number 11. In March 2020, Boris Johnson refurbished the residential apartment at Number 11. This became the subject of public controversy, and an Electoral Commission inquiry took place into the financing of the refurbishment.

In May 2023, a car was driven into the Downing Street gates. Rishi Sunak was present inside the residences at the time. A man was arrested by police and the car crash was not terrorism-related.

== 10 Downing Street today ==
The current prime minister is Andy Burnham. 10 Downing Street houses the Cabinet Room, in which Cabinet meetings take place, chaired by the prime minister. It also houses the Prime Minister's Executive Office, which deals with government logistics and diplomacy.

== Rooms and special features ==
=== Front door and entrance hall ===
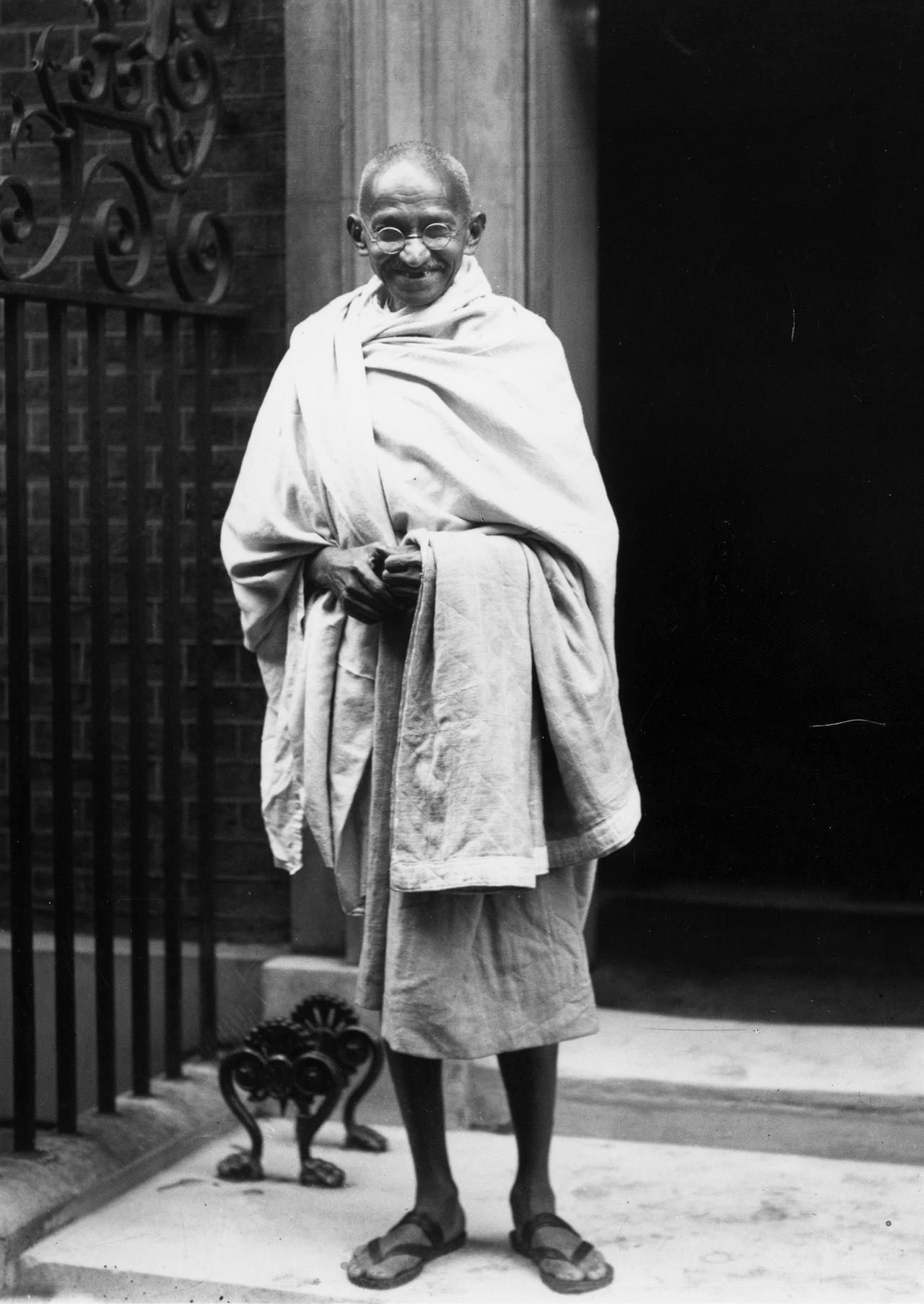
Mahatma Gandhi outside Number 10 in 1931. Dignitaries and visitors often pose for a photograph outside the door.

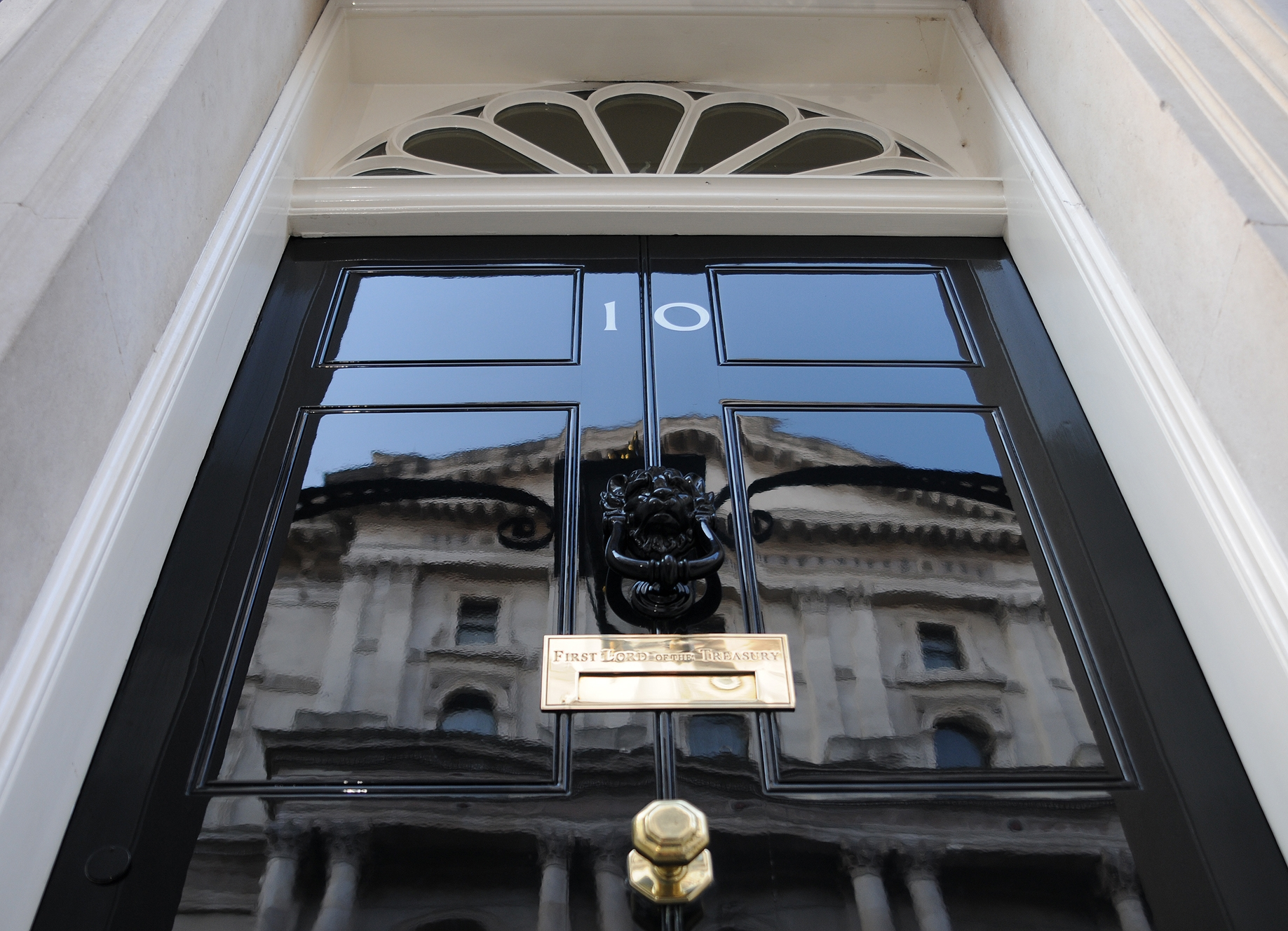
The front door of 10 Downing Street, showing the letter-box inscribed with "First Lord of the Treasury"

Number 10's door is the product of the renovations Charles Townshend ordered in 1766; it was probably not completed until 1772. Executed in the Georgian style by the architect Kenton Couse, it is unassuming and narrow, consisting of a single white stone step leading to a modest brick front. The small, six-panelled door, originally made of black oak, is surrounded by cream-coloured casing and adorned with a semicircular fanlight window. Painted in white, between the top and middle sets of panels, is the number "10". The zero of the number "10" is painted tilted, apparently based on the post-war Ministry of Works' standard "Trajan" signage alphabet. A black iron knocker in the shape of a lion's head is between the two middle panels; below the knocker is a brass letter box with the inscription "First Lord of the Treasury". The doorbell is inscribed with "PUSH" although is rarely used in practice. A black ironwork fence with spiked newel posts runs along the front of the house and up each side of the step to the door. The fence rises above the step into a double-swirled archway, supporting an iron gas lamp surmounted by a crown. In modern times the door cannot be opened from the outside; there is always someone inside to grant entry.

After the IRA mortar attack in 1991, the original black oak door was replaced by a blast-proof steel one. Regularly removed for refurbishment and replaced with a replica, it is so heavy that it takes eight men to lift it. The brass letterbox still bears the legend "First Lord of the Treasury". The original door was put on display in the Churchill Museum at the Cabinet War Rooms.

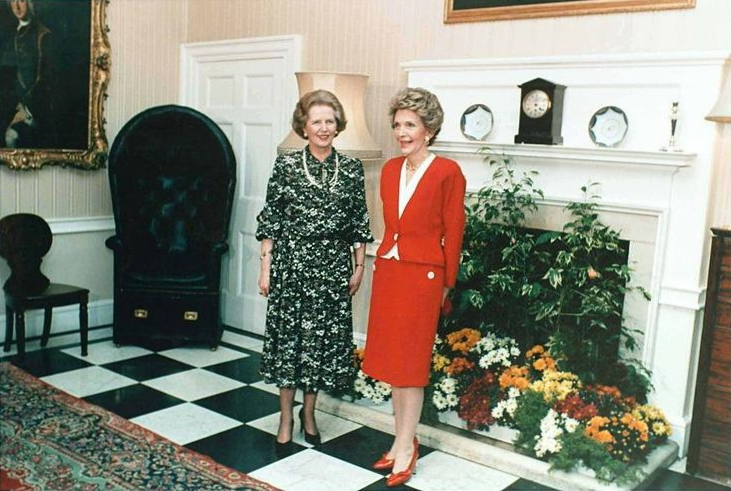
Prime Minister Margaret Thatcher with US first lady Nancy Reagan in 1986 standing in the entrance hall

Beyond the door, Couse installed black and white marble tiles in the entrance hall that are still in use. A guard's chair designed by Thomas Chippendale sits in one corner. Once used when policemen sat on watch outside in the street, it has an unusual "hood" designed to protect them from the wind and cold and a drawer underneath where hot coals were placed to provide warmth. Scratches on the right arm were caused by their pistols rubbing up against the leather. Number 10 Downing Street has a lift.

Couse also added a bow front to the small cottage – formerly Mr Chicken's house – incorporated into Number 10 in Walpole's time.

=== Main staircase ===
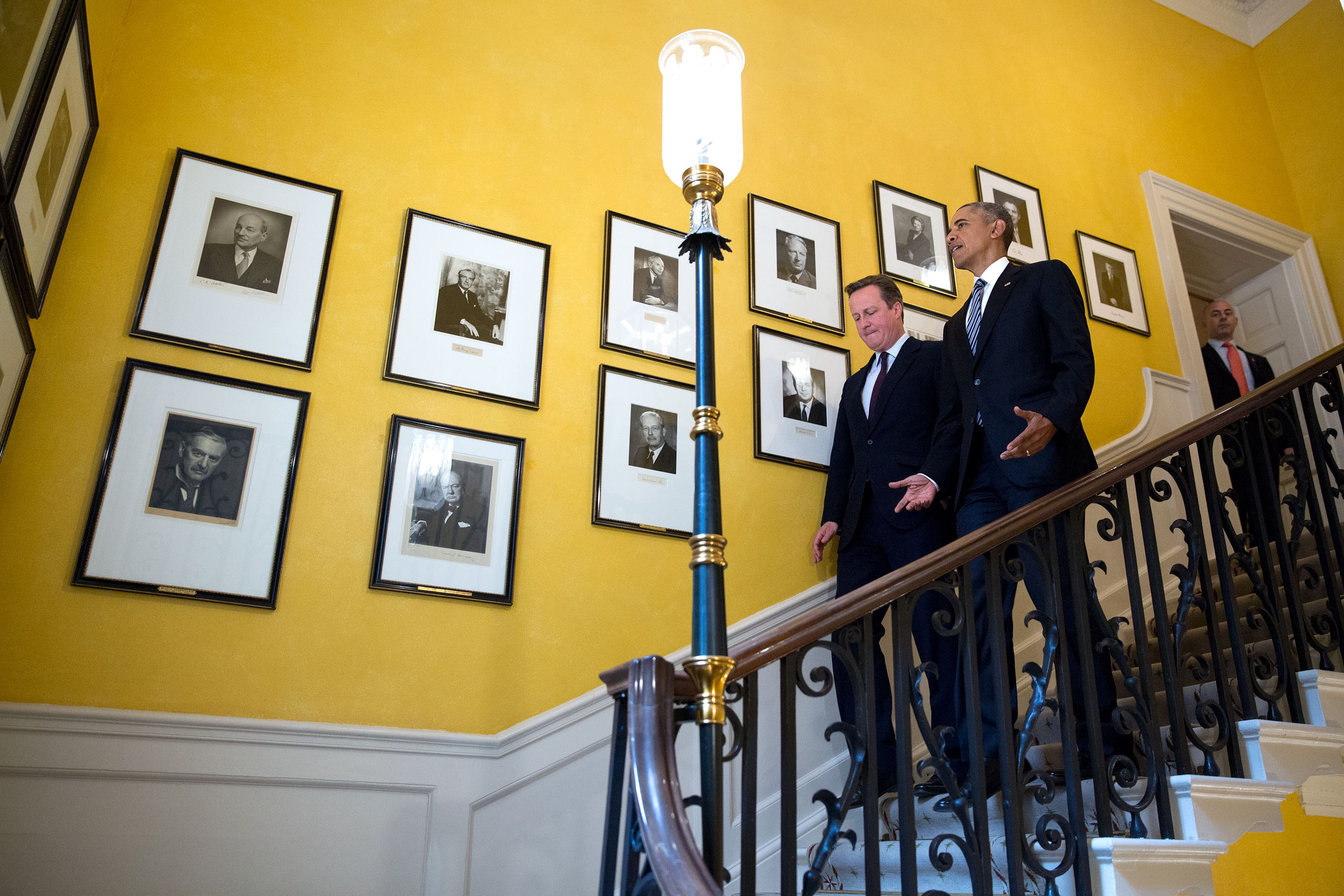
Main staircase, 2016

When William Kent rebuilt the interior between 1732 and 1734, his craftsmen created a stone triple staircase. The main section had no visible supports. With a wrought iron balustrade, embellished with a scroll design, and mahogany handrail, it rises from the garden floor to the third floor. Kent's staircase is the first architectural feature visitors see as they enter Number 10. Black and white engravings and photographs of all the past prime ministers decorate the wall. They are rearranged slightly to make room for a photograph of each new prime minister. There is one exception: Winston Churchill is represented in two photographs. At the bottom of the staircase are group photographs of prime ministers with their Cabinet ministers and representatives to imperial conferences.

=== Cabinet Room ===
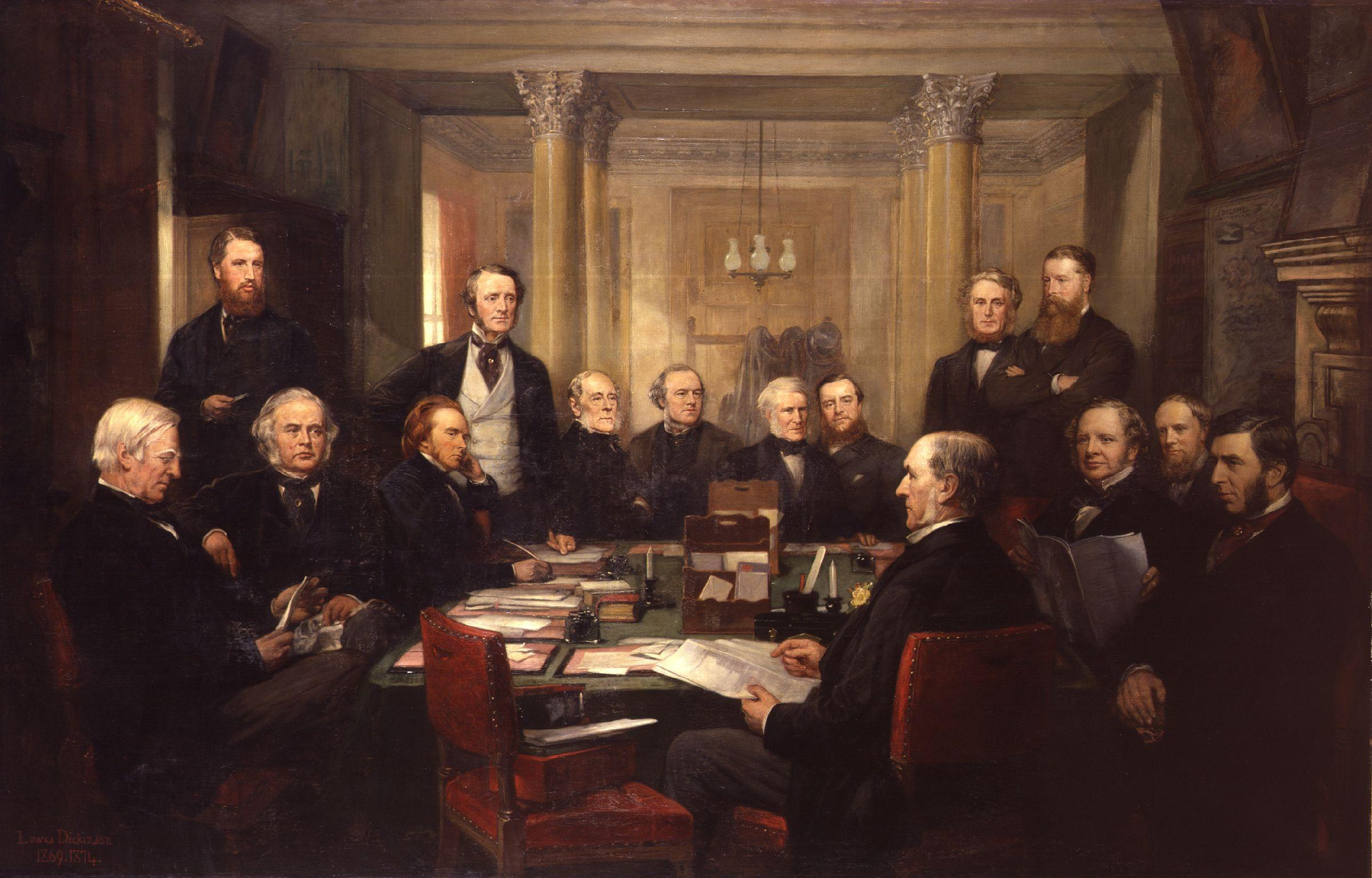
Gladstone's Cabinet of 1868 by Lowes Cato Dickinson. Prime Minister William Gladstone (in the foreground) meeting with his Cabinet in 1868 in the Cabinet Room, with its distinctive pair of double columns in the background

In Kent's design for the enlarged Number 10, the Cabinet Room was a simple rectangular space with enormous windows. As part of the renovations begun in 1783, it was extended, giving the space its modern appearance. Probably not completed until 1796, this alteration was achieved by removing the east wall and rebuilding it several feet inside the adjoining secretaries' room. At the entrance, a screen of two pairs of Corinthian columns was erected (to carry the extra span of the ceiling) supporting a moulded entablature that wraps around the room. Robert Taylor, the architect who executed this concept, was knighted on its completion. The resulting small space, framed by the pillars, serves as an anteroom to the larger area. Hendrick Danckerts' painting "The Palace of Whitehall" usually hangs in the vestibule. It also contains two large bookcases that house the prime minister's library; Cabinet members traditionally donate to the collection on leaving office – a tradition that began with Ramsay MacDonald in 1931.

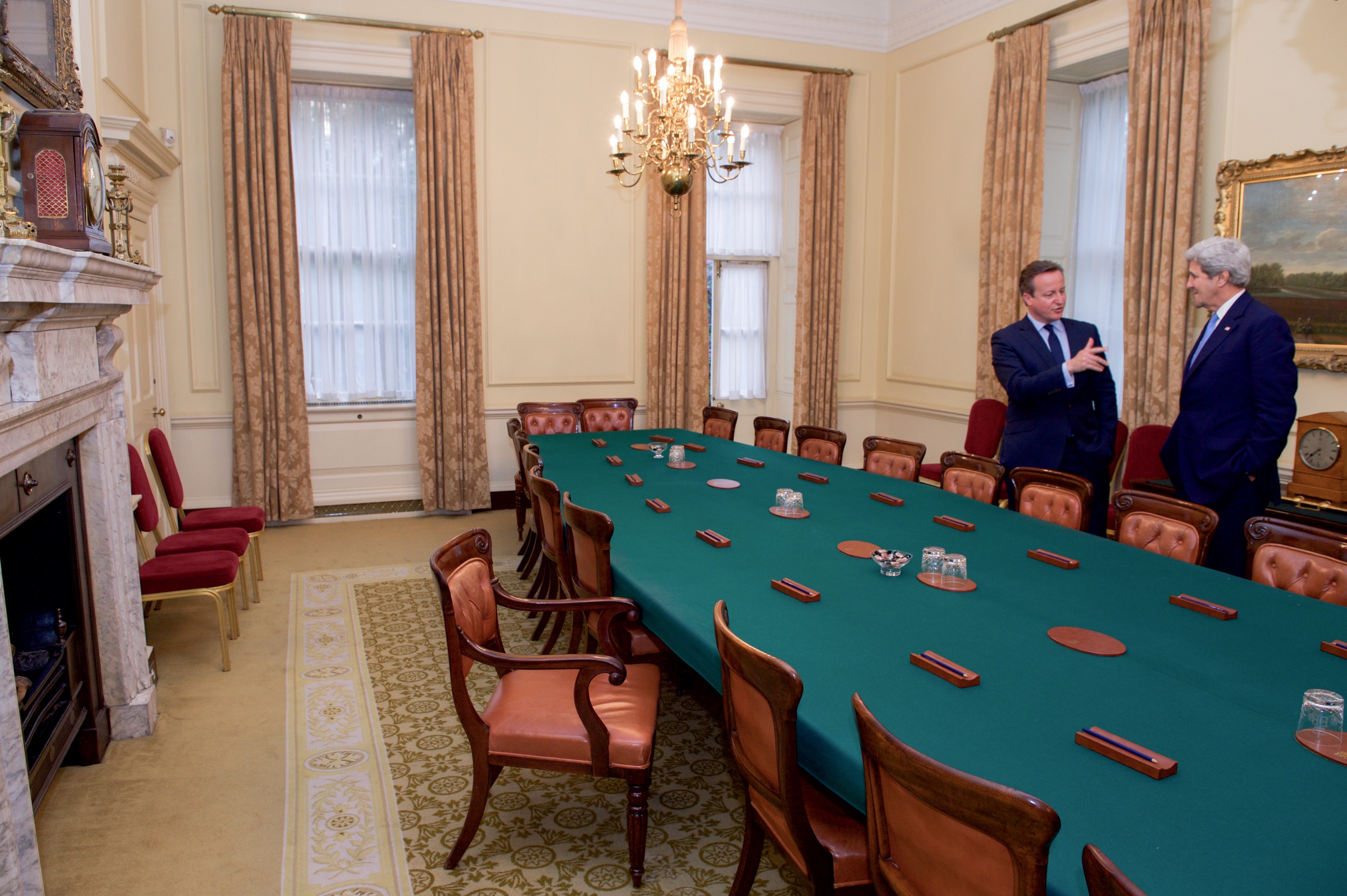
David Cameron showing John Kerry around the Cabinet Room in 2016

Although Kent intended the First Lord to use this space as his study, it has rarely served that purpose; it has almost always been the Cabinet Room. There have been a few exceptions. Stanley Baldwin used the Cabinet Room as his office. A few prime ministers, such as Tony Blair, occasionally worked at the Cabinet Room table. Painted off-white with large floor to ceiling windows along one of the long walls, the room is light and airy. Three brass chandeliers hang from the high ceiling. The Cabinet table, purchased during the Gladstone era, dominates the room. The modern boat-shaped top, introduced by Harold Macmillan in the late 1950s, is supported by huge original oak legs. The table is surrounded by carved, solid mahogany chairs that also date from the Gladstone era. The prime minister's chair, the only one with arms, is situated midway along one side in front of the marble fireplace, facing the windows; when not in use, it is positioned at an angle for easy access. The only picture in the room is a copy of a portrait of Robert Walpole by Jean-Baptiste van Loo hanging over the fireplace.

=== State drawing rooms ===
Number 10 has three inter-linked state drawing rooms: the Pillared Drawing Room, the Terracotta Drawing Room and the White Drawing Room.

==== Pillared State Drawing Room ====
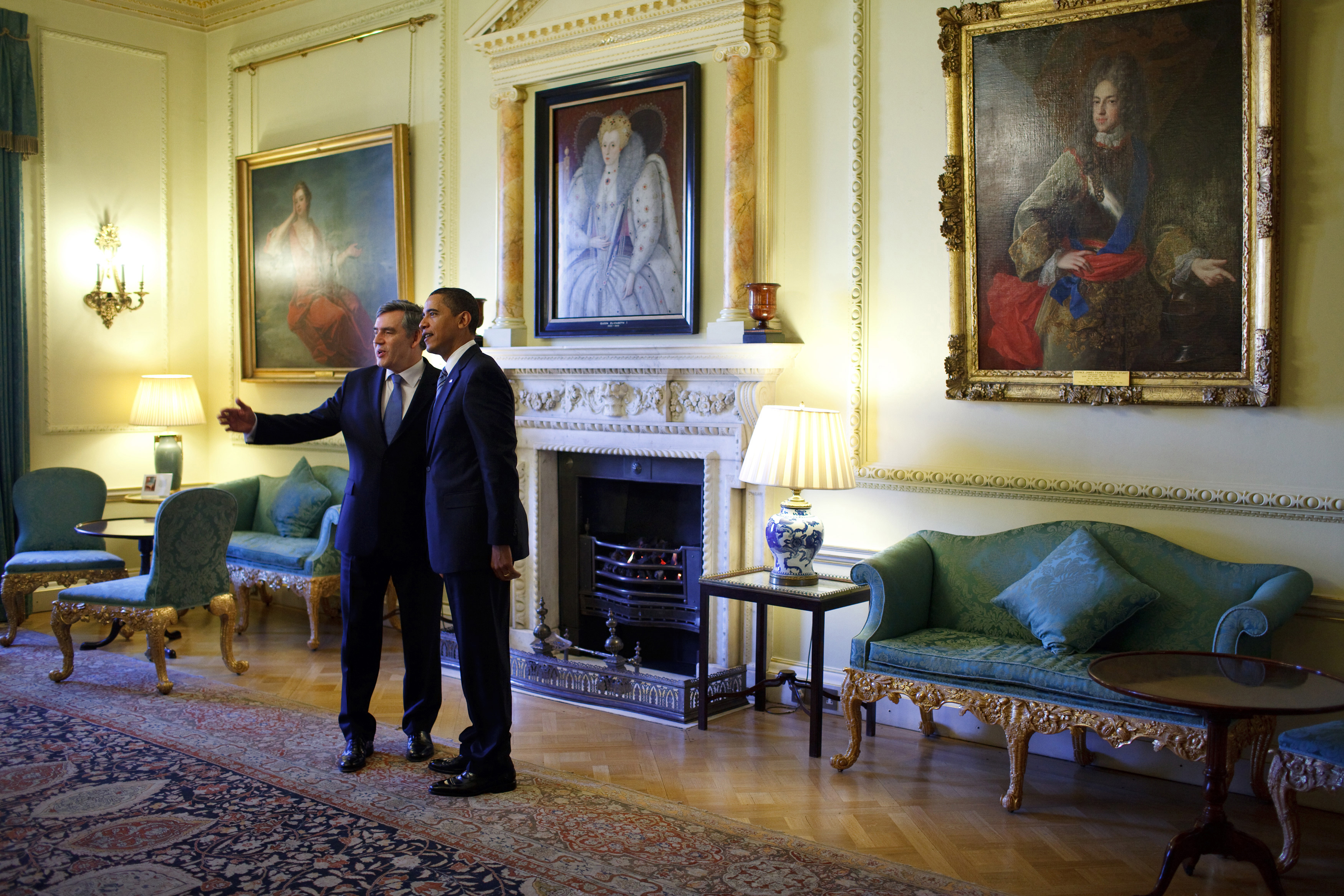
Prime Minister Gordon Brown and US president Barack Obama in the Pillared Room, 2009

The largest is the Pillared Room thought to have been created in 1796 by Taylor. Measuring 37 feet (11 m) long by 28 feet (8.5 m) wide, it takes its name from the twin Ionic pilasters with straight pediments at one end. Today, there is a portrait of Queen Elizabeth I over the fireplace; during the Thatcher, Major and Blair ministries, a portrait of William Pitt by Romney was hung there.

A Persian carpet covers almost the entire floor. A copy of a 16th-century original now kept in the Victoria and Albert Museum, there is an inscription woven into it that reads: "I have no refuge in the world other than thy threshold. My head has no protection other than this porchway. The work of a slave of the holy place, Maqsud of Kashan in the year 926" (the Islamic year corresponding to 1520).

In the restoration conducted in the late 1980s, Quinlan Terry restored the fireplace. Executed in the Kentian style, the small Ionic pilasters in the over-mantel are miniature duplicates of the large Ionic pillars in the room. The Ionic motif is also found in the door surrounds and panelling.

Sparsely furnished with a few chairs and sofas around the walls, the Pillared Room is usually used to receive guests before they go into the State Dining Room. However, it is sometimes used for other purposes that require a large open space. International agreements have been signed in this room. Tony Blair entertained the England Rugby Union team in the Pillared Room after they won the World Cup in 2003. John Logie Baird gave Ramsay MacDonald a demonstration of his invention, the television, in this room. After the Apollo 11 lunar landing in July 1969, Harold Wilson hosted a reception in the room for the astronauts Neil Armstrong, Buzz Aldrin and Michael Collins, in addition to the Cambridge scientist Francis Thomas Bacon, inventor of the alkaline fuel cell used to generate power for space capsules.

==== Terracotta State Drawing Room ====
The Terracotta Room is the middle of the three drawing rooms. It was used as the dining room when Robert Walpole was prime minister. The name changes according to the colour it is painted. When Margaret Thatcher came to power it was the Blue Room; she had it re-decorated and renamed the Green Room. It is now painted terracotta.

In the renovation of the 1980s, Quinlan Terry introduced large Doric order columns to this room in the door surrounds and designed a very large Palladian overmantel for the fireplace with small double Doric columns on each side with the royal arms above. Terry also added an ornate gilded ceiling to give the rooms a more stately look. Carved into the plasterwork above the door leading to the Pillared Room is a tribute to Margaret Thatcher: a straw-carrying 'thatcher'.

==== White State Drawing Room ====
The White State Drawing room was, until the 1940s, for the private use of prime ministers and their spouses. It was here that Edward Heath kept his grand piano. It is often used as the backdrop for television interviews and is in regular use as a meeting room for Downing Street staff. The room links through to the Terracotta Room next door. In the reconstruction during the late 1980s, Quinlan Terry used Corinthian columns and added ornate Baroque-style central ceiling mouldings and corner mouldings of the four national flowers of the United Kingdom: rose (England), thistle (Scotland), daffodil (Wales) and shamrock (Northern Ireland).

=== State Dining Room ===
When Frederick Robinson (later Lord Goderich), became Chancellor of the Exchequer in 1823, he decided to leave a personal legacy to the nation. To this end, he employed John Soane, the distinguished architect who had designed the Bank of England and many other famous buildings, to build a State Dining Room for Number 10. Begun in 1825 and completed in 1826 at a cost of £2,000, the result is a spacious room with oak panelling and reeded mouldings. Accessed through the first floor, its vaulted, arched ceiling rises up through the next so that it actually occupies two floors. Measuring 42 by 26 feet (12.8 by 7.9 m), it is the largest room in Number 10. Soane was the guest of honour when the dining room was first used on 4 April 1826.

The room is usually furnished with a table surrounded by 20 reproduction Adam style chairs originally made for the British Embassy in Rio de Janeiro. For larger gatherings, a horseshoe-shaped table is brought in that will accommodate up to 65 guests. On these occasions, the table is set with the Silver Trust Silver set given to Downing Street in the 1990s. Above the fireplace, overlooking the room, is a massive portrait by John Shackleton of George II, the king who originally gave the building to the First Lord of the Treasury in 1732. Celebrity chefs such as Nigella Lawson have cooked for Prime Ministers' guests using the small kitchen next door. Entering through the Small Dining Room, Blair used this room for his monthly press conferences.

=== Great kitchen ===
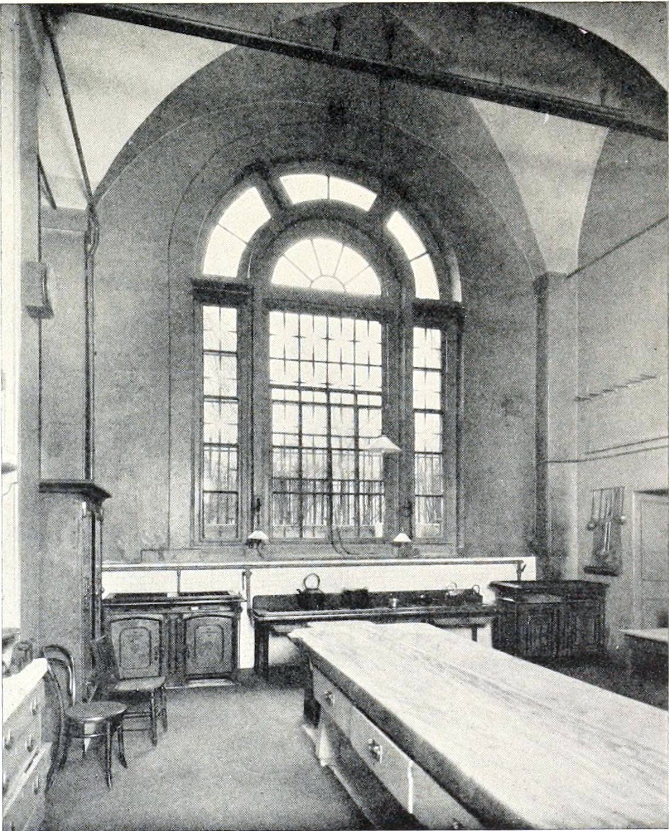
Great kitchen, 1931

The great kitchen located in the basement was another part of the renovations begun in 1783, probably also under the direction of Robert Taylor. Seldom seen by anyone other than staff, the space is two storeys high with a huge arched window and vaulted ceiling. Traditionally, it has always had a chopping block work table in the centre that is 14 feet (4.3 m) long, 3 feet (0.91 m) wide and 5 inches (13 cm) thick.

=== Smaller Dining or Breakfast Room ===
Above Taylor's vaulted kitchen, between the Pillared Room and the State Dining room, Soane created a Smaller Dining Room (sometimes called the Breakfast Room) that still exists. To build it, Soane removed the chimney from the kitchen to put a door in the room. He then moved the chimney to the east side, running a Y-shaped split flue inside the walls up either side of one of the windows above. The room therefore has a unique architectural feature: over the fireplace there is a window instead of the usual chimney breast.

With its flat unadorned ceiling, simple mouldings and deep window seats, the Small Dining Room is intimate and comfortable. Usually furnished with a mahogany table seating only eight, Prime Ministers have often used this room when dining with family or when entertaining special guests on more personal state occasions.

=== Terrace and garden ===
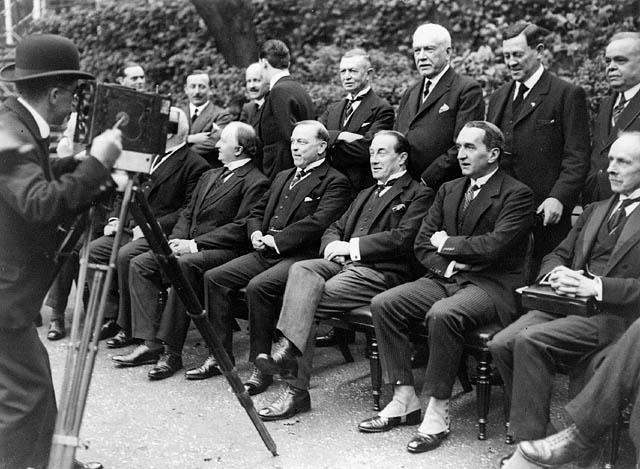
Prime Minister Stanley Baldwin (seated centre with his legs crossed) poses in the garden of Number Ten with representatives to the 1923 Imperial Conference.

The terrace and garden were constructed in 1736 shortly after Walpole moved into Number 10. The terrace, extending across the back, provides a full view of St James's Park. The garden is dominated by a 0.5 acres (0.20 ha) open lawn which wraps around Numbers 10 and 11 in an L-shape. No longer "fitted with variety Walle fruit and diverse fruit trees" as it was in the 17th century, there is now a centrally located flower bed around a holly tree surrounded by seats. Tubs of flowers line the steps from the terrace; around the walls are rose beds with flowering and evergreen shrubs. The terrace and garden have provided a casual setting for many gatherings of First Lords with foreign dignitaries, Cabinet ministers, guests, and staff. Prime Minister Tony Blair, for example, hosted a farewell reception in 2007 for his staff on the terrace. John Major announced his 1995 resignation as leader of the Conservative Party in the garden. Churchill called his secretaries the "garden girls" because their offices overlook the garden. It was also the location of the first press conference announcing the Coalition Government between David Cameron's Conservatives and Nick Clegg's Liberal Democrats. During the COVID-19 pandemic in 2020, the garden was used for work meetings by 10 Downing Street staff, given advice to meet outdoors to reduce transmission risks. In January 2022, controversy arose over whether some events in May 2020 were social gatherings or parties that breached COVID-19 restrictions.

=== Furnishings ===
Number 10 is filled with fine paintings, sculptures, busts and furniture. Only a few are permanent features. Most are on loan. About half belong to the Government Art Collection. The remainder are on loan from private collectors and from public galleries such as the National Portrait Gallery, the Tate Gallery, the Victoria and Albert Museum and the National Gallery.

About a dozen paintings are changed annually. More extensive changes occur when a new prime minister takes office and redecorates. These redecorations may reflect both individual taste as well as make a political statement. Edward Heath borrowed French paintings from the National Gallery and was loaned two Renoirs from a private collector. When Margaret Thatcher arrived in 1979 she insisted that the artwork had to be British and that it celebrate "British achievers". As a former chemist, she took pleasure in devoting the Small Dining Room to a collection of portraits of British scientists, such as Joseph Priestley and Humphry Davy. During the 1990s John Major converted the first floor anteroom into a small gallery of modern art, mostly British. He also introduced several paintings by John Constable and J. M. W. Turner, Britain's two best known 19th-century artists, and cricketing paintings by Archibald Stuart-Wortley including a portrait of one of England's most celebrated batsmen W. G. Grace.

In addition to outstanding artwork, Number 10 contains many exceptional pieces of furniture either owned by the house or on loan. One of the most striking and unusual is the already mentioned Chippendale hooded guard's chair that sits in a corner of the entrance hall. To its left is a long case clock by Benson of Whitehaven. A similar clock by Samuel Whichcote of London stands in the Cabinet anteroom. The White State Drawing Room contains examples of Adam furniture. The Green State Drawing Room contains mostly Chippendale furniture including a card table that belonged to Clive of India and a mahogany desk that is thought to have belonged to William Pitt the Younger and used by him during the Napoleonic Wars. In addition to the large carpet previously described, the Pillared State Drawing Room also contains a marble-topped table by Kent. The State Dining Room contains a mahogany sideboard by Adam. Until the late 19th century, Prime Ministers were required to furnish Number 10 at their own expense with furniture, tableware, china, linens, curtains and decorations. This arrangement began to change in 1877 when Benjamin Disraeli took up residency. He insisted that the Treasury should bear the cost of furnishings at least in the public areas. The Treasury agreed and a complex accounting procedure was developed whereby the outgoing prime minister was required to pay for "wear and tear" on furnishings that had been purchased by the Treasury. This system was used until November 1897 when the Treasury assumed responsibility for purchasing and maintaining almost all of the furnishings in both the public and private areas except decorating the walls with art work. In 1924 when Prime Minister Ramsay MacDonald took office, he did not own nor have the means to buy an extensive art collection. He had the Government Art Collection loan pieces. The arrangement became the standard practice.

== 250th anniversary: 1985 ==
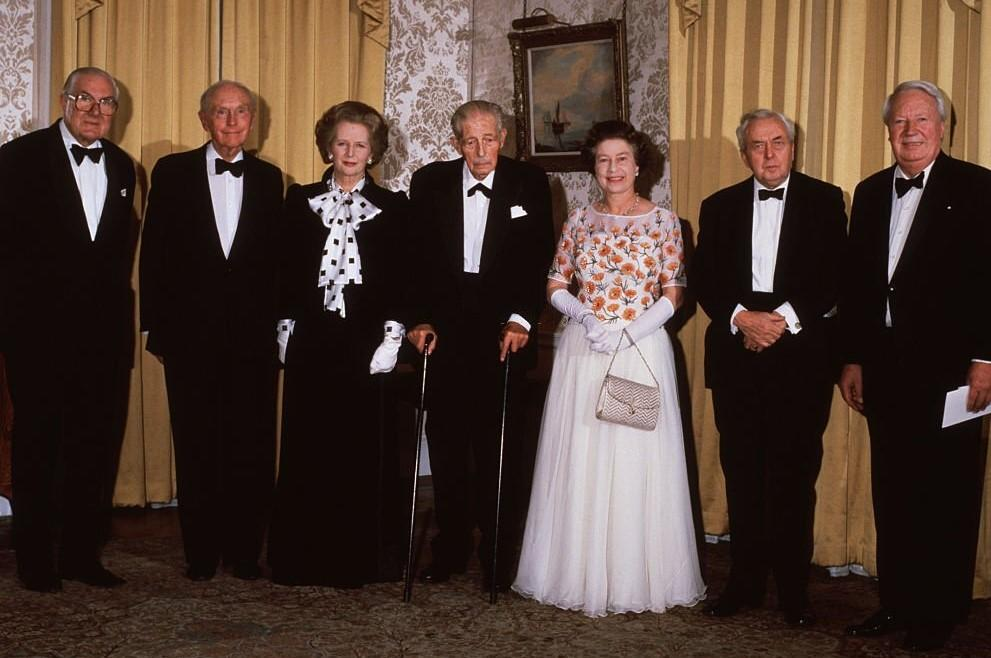
Queen Elizabeth II in Downing Street in 1985, to mark the 250th anniversary of Robert Walpole's occupancy of No. 10

In 1985, Number 10 was 250 years old. To celebrate, Thatcher hosted a grand dinner in the State Dining Room for her living predecessors: Harold Macmillan, Alec Douglas-Home, Harold Wilson, Edward Heath and James Callaghan. Also in attendance were Elizabeth II and representatives of the families of every 20th-century Prime Minister since H. H. Asquith, including Lady Olwen Carey Evans (daughter of David Lloyd George), Lady Leonora Howard (daughter of Stanley Baldwin), and Clarissa Avon (widow of Anthony Eden and niece of Winston Churchill).

That same year, the Leisure Circle published Christopher Jones' book No. 10 Downing Street, The Story of a House. In the foreword, Thatcher described her feelings for Number 10: "How much I wish that the public ... could share with me the feeling of Britain's historic greatness which pervades every nook and cranny of this complicated and meandering old building ... All Prime Ministers are intensely aware that, as tenants and stewards of No. 10 Downing Street, they have in their charge one of the most precious jewels in the nation's heritage".

== Security after the 1991 bombing ==
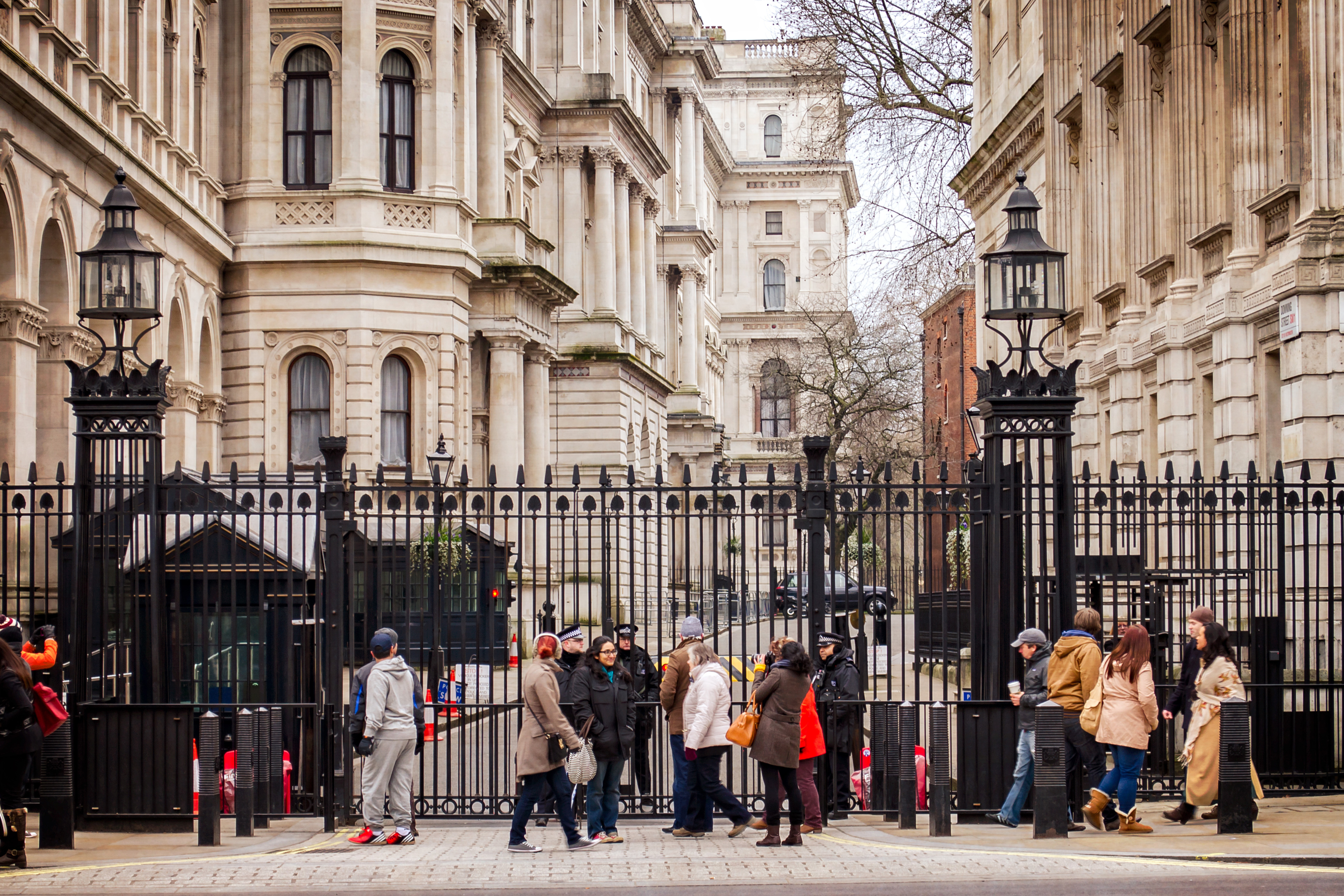
Gates at the main entrance of Downing Street

For most of its history, Number 10 was accessible to the public. Early security consisted of two police officers: one stood guard outside the door; the other was stationed inside to open it. Since the door had no keyhole, the inside officer depended upon the lone outside officer. During Thatcher's premiership, terrorist threats led to the implementation of a second level of security. Despite the added measure, on 7 February 1991, the Provisional IRA used a van they parked in Whitehall to launch a mortar bomb at Number 10. It exploded in the back garden, while Prime Minister John Major was holding a Cabinet meeting. Major moved to Admiralty House while repairs were being completed. The attack led to the famous black door being replaced with a new blast-proof door and the addition of guardhouses at the street ends as well as other less visible measures to further improve security of Downing Street.

== See also ==
- 10 Downing Street lecterns
- 10 Downing Street Guard Chairs
- Chief Mouser to the Cabinet Office—the tongue-in-cheek title given to the cat maintained to control the persistent mouse problem at 10 Downing Street
- List of residents of 10 Downing Street
- Number 10 North
