= Van der Leeuw House =

Van der Leeuw House may refer to:

- Van der Leeuw House, in Rotterdam, the Netherlands, designed by Leendert van der Vlugt. Pic of house at Leendert van der Vlugt#Complications Authorship.
- Neutra VDL Studio and Residences, known also as Van der Leeuw Research House, Los Angeles, California, designed by Richard and Dion Neutra, listed on the U.S. National Register of Historic Places
