= Michiel Brinkman =

Dutch architect (1873 - 1925)

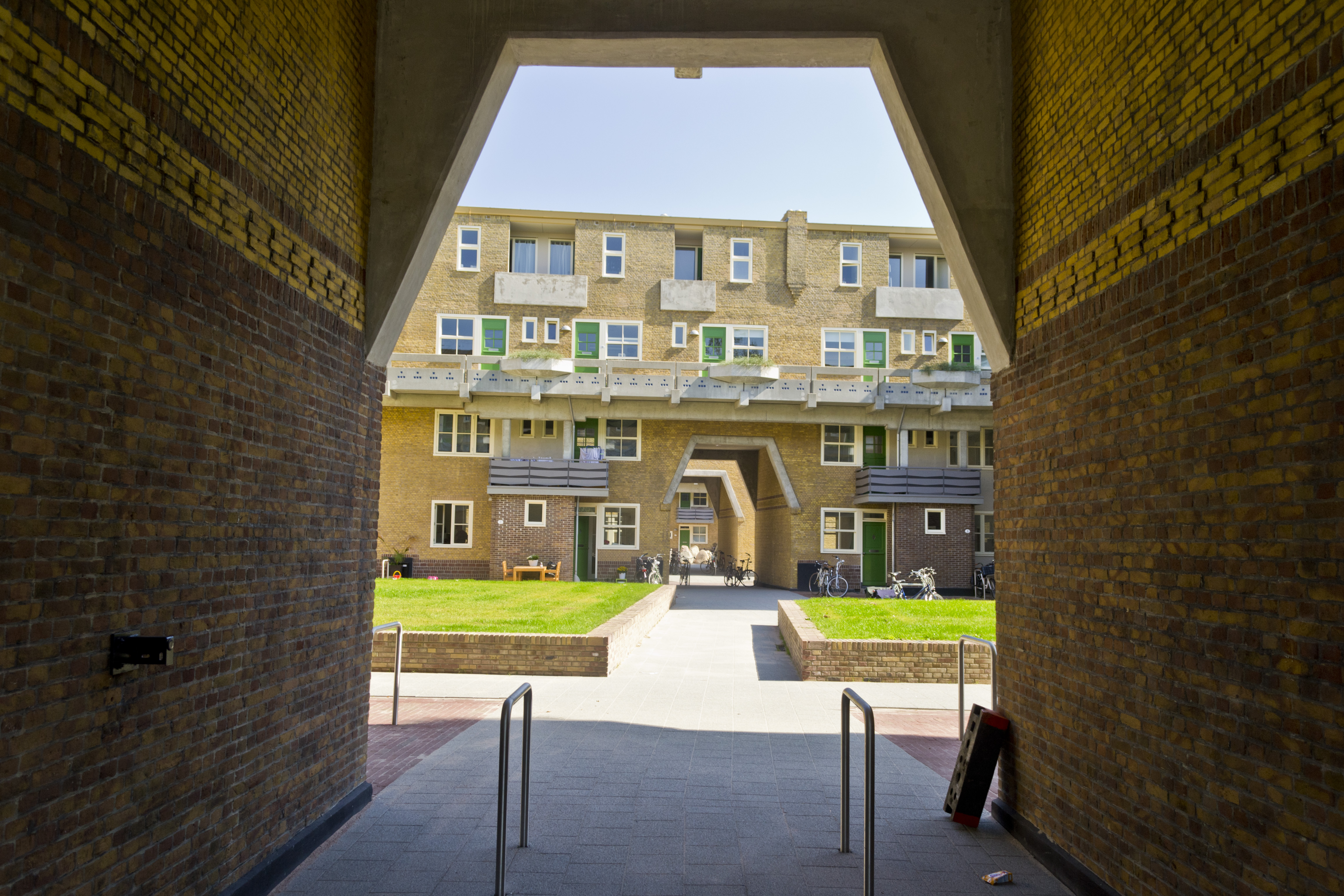
the courtyard through the Eastern entrance 2016

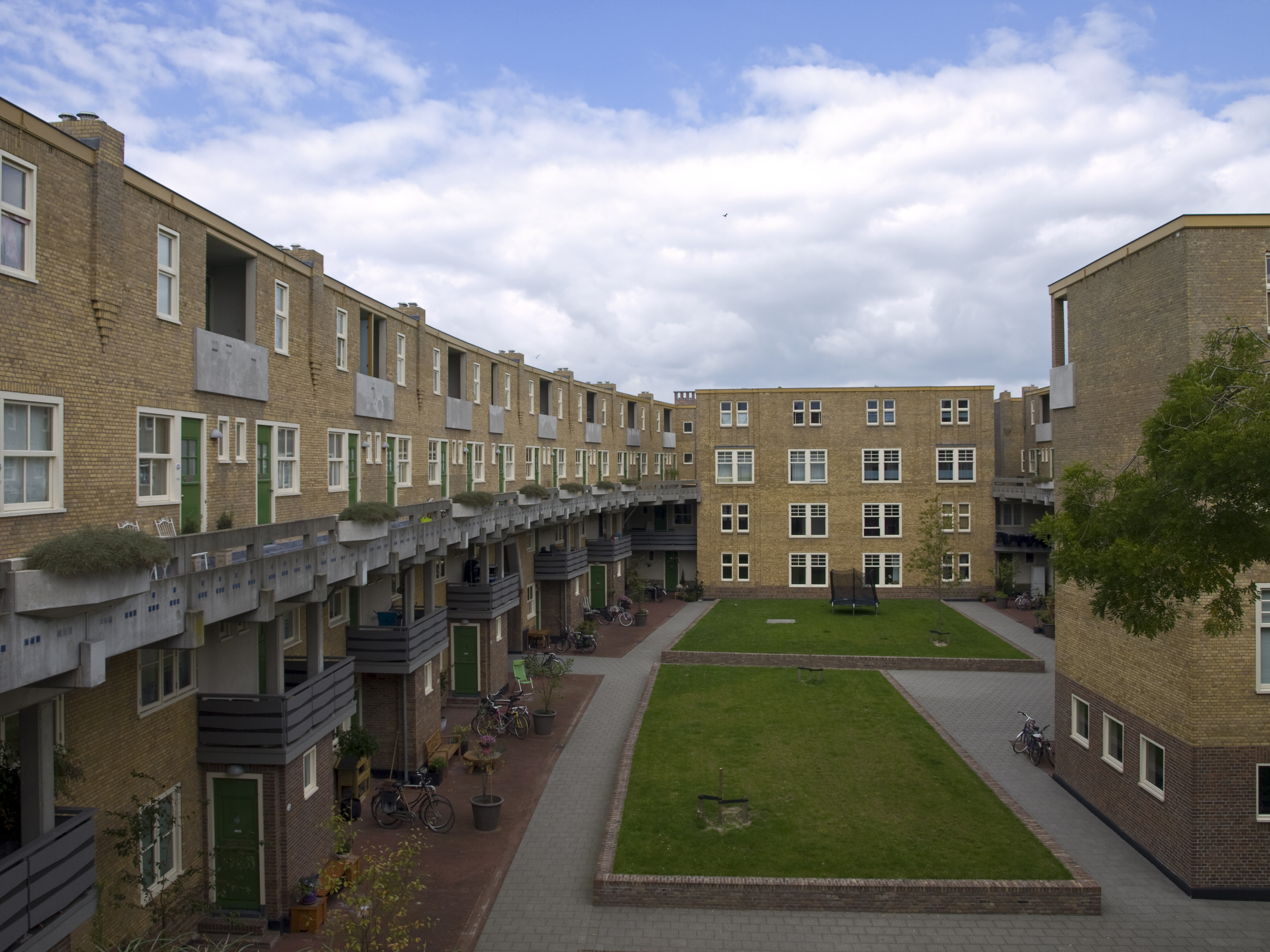
'Bovenstraat'- the first 'Streets in the Sky' 2015

Michiel Brinkman (1873–1925) was a Dutch architect and the father of Johannes Brinkman the exponent of Nieuwe Bouwen, modern architecture in the Netherlands. Michiel Brinkman is notable for his Justus van Effen housing block complex in Spangen, which is a Rijksmonument, built in 1922. it incorporates 3m wide connecting terraces on the third floor, known in Dutch as Bovenstraten (sing. Bovenstraat), and in English as 'Streets in the sky'.

== Career ==
Michiel Brinkman was born in Rotterdam on 16 December 1873, the son of Hermanus Antonie Brinkman and Anna Maria Brinkman (née Juijn). He married Andrea Johanna Salomina Wulff. He studied at the 'Academie van Beeldende Kunsten en Technische Wetenschappen', nowadays called Willem de Kooning Academy, under Henri Evers. He practised in the office of Barend Hooijkaas jr., until 1910 when he opened his own firm. Brinkman en Hooijkaas during 1908-1909, built the 'Koninklijke Roei- en Zeilvereeniging De Maas' in Veerhaven. This is celebrated as a Rijksmonument.

The architecture practice Brinkman & Van der Vlugt (1925-1936) designed the Van Nelle factory in Rotterdam, the Feyenoord football stadium and the standard Dutch telephone box. Later he worked with his son, J.A. Brinkman, in a partnership with L.C. van der Vlugt, J.H. van den Broek and Jaap Bakema.

== Justus van Effencomplex ==
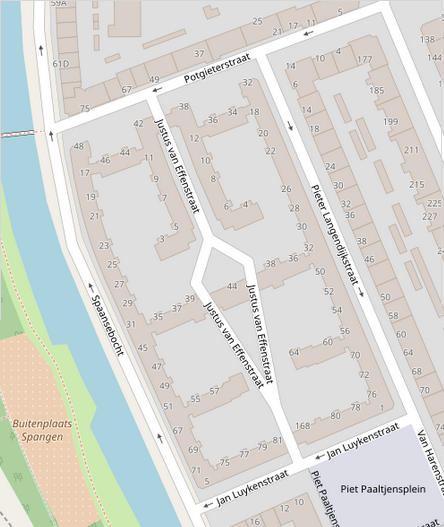
Justus van Effen site in 2017

"the apotheosis of Dutch functionalism ":Arjan Hebly

In 1919 Michiel Brinkman designed a complex of 273 dwellings in the Spangen district of Rotterdam. One large block of 147 by 85 metres encircles a courtyard containing a few smaller blocks and a central taller service block with a central heating plant, baths and cycle shelter. A public street enters and leaves the perimeter hugging block through 6m high arches, the road forks at the facilities building. An architecturally significant feature was the use of an access terrace, the bovenstraat a raised walkway along the block's inner edge at third storey level. This reduced the need for many space-consuming stair towers.

Brinkman chose to offer a middle ground between two conventional models of social housing: the poorly ventilated, dimly lit towers of dense cities and the undifferentiated row houses of suburban enclaves. He aimed to achieve a feeling of unity associated with garden-village development, whilst using a stacked construction and bovenstraten. He was experienced in planning industrial buildings where the flows of commodities between processes are critical, and he took such a systems approach towards housing. Tradesmens' delivery route were facilitated, and the directions of rubbish disposal. He was familiar with new ways of working with reinforced concrete, and employed it to form the floor decks. Balconies were precast. The window sizes followed function, large for lounges and small and recessed for bedrooms. Window placement was such that they were designed into the room, but also used externally as a regular visual feature. The courtyard is broken up into a series public areas that ripple from small to large giving a dynamic to the external space. Buildings are pierced at ground floor level by the road and main pathways but are continuous at the level of the bovenstraat.

Most units are entered from the inner courtyard. Units on the ground and first floors are accessed at ground level and have their own garden. Above these are two maisonettes reached from the access gallery. All units consist of a living room, kitchen, toilet and three bedrooms, plus central heating which was a first for Dutch social housing, and a rubbish chute

The bovenstraat was reached by one of ten stairways and two goods lifts, which allowed tradesmen to bring their trolleys, which were very much a feature of 1920s South Holland, up to the front-doors. The terraces were provided with plant-boxes and play space for the children to socialise. Every unit had outside laundry drying space. There was some initial criticism that this was 'un-Dutch' and just added unnecessary cost to the scheme, this was adamantly rebuked by the Socialist dominated city council.

The neglected scheme was first renovated in 1985-1990, some maisonettes were knocked through to provide accommodation for larger families and the walls were rendered with a white stucco, and the detailed windows replaced with generic stock. This was at a time of recession in Rotterdam and the project was not successful. A second attempt led by Dutch architecture practices Molenaar & Co. and Hebly Theunissen, and a landscape architect Michael van Gessel, began in 2006 and was completed in 2012. The restoration team won the 2016 World Monuments Fund/Knoll Modernism Prize for their work. The original exterior details were restored, while the interiors were improved by installing modern heating systems that use rooftop solar panels to capture heat for hotwater and glazing the interior doors to improve the quality of the light.

The bovenstraat walkway concept, 'Streets in the sky', influential on Dutch architecture was developed further by Le Corbusier for his Unite d'Habitation in Marseilles, and later by Peter and Alison Smithson for Golden Lane Estate and Robin Hood Gardens, in London.

== Notable buildings ==
- Clubhouse Koninklijke Roei- en Zeilvereniging De Maas (1909)
- Elevatorhuis (1915)
- Steam-Driven Flour Mill De Maas (A.M. van Dusseldorp & co) (1913)
- Housing Justus van Effen Block (1922)
- Private House Dennenrode (1923)
