= Bergpolderflat =

Coordinates: 51.9350°N 4.4661°E

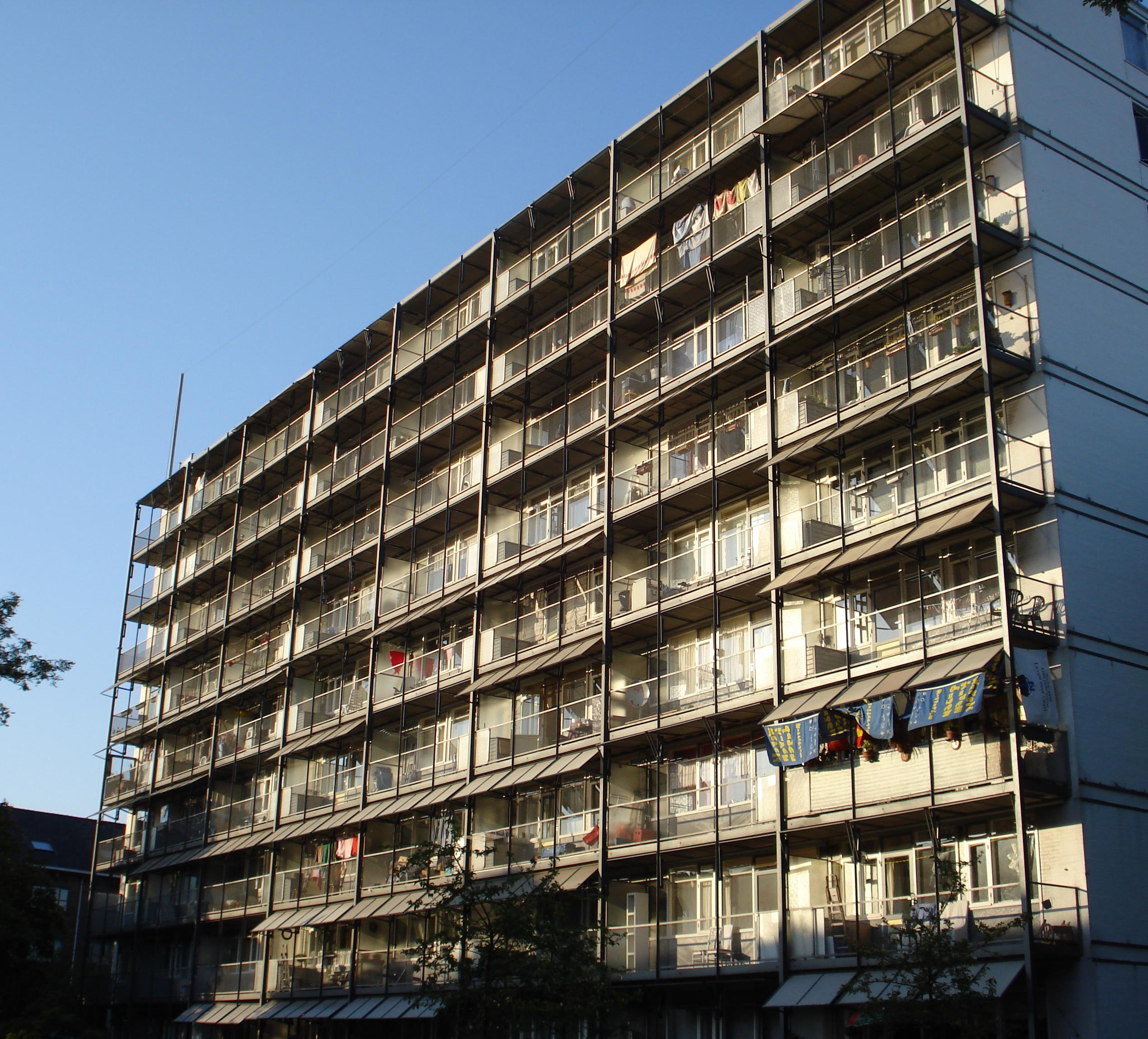
- Bergpolderflat
- Interactive map of the Bergpolderflat area

General information
- Location: Rotterdam district Bergpolder, The Netherlands
- Opened: 1934
- Renovated: 1996

Technical details
- Material: Steel, glass

Design and construction
- Architects: W. de Tijen; Brinkman; Leendert van der Vlugt
- Architecture firm: NV Volkswoningbouw Rotterdam

The Bergpolderflat in the Rotterdam district Bergpolder (corner of Abraham Kuyperlaan and Borgesiusstraat) was the first gallery flat in the Netherlands.

The flat has a steel skeleton and was designed in 1933/1934 by the architect W. de Tijen in collaboration with architects Brinkman and Van der Vlugt in the Modern style, functional, sleek, light and airy. The apartment was built by NV Volkswoningbouw Rotterdam.

The flat has nine floors and 72 homes through an accessible gallery. There was a common washroom in the basement and modern, for the time, amenities such as central heating and the right to a free bucket of warm water.

In Bergpolderflat cases were first applied generally, later, as the gallery with a balcony, central staircase and open the glass walls. There is still the traditional wooden construction beams, but with three layers is a fireproof concrete floor. The Bergpolderflat has prefabricated wooden doors.

There was criticism of the limited number of bedrooms. de Tijen disputed such criticism by stating that "the houses were mainly designed for modern young people who like simple, light and space."

In 1996, the building, a national monument, was renovated by Vestia.
