= Mart Stam =

Dutch architect, urban planner and furniture designer

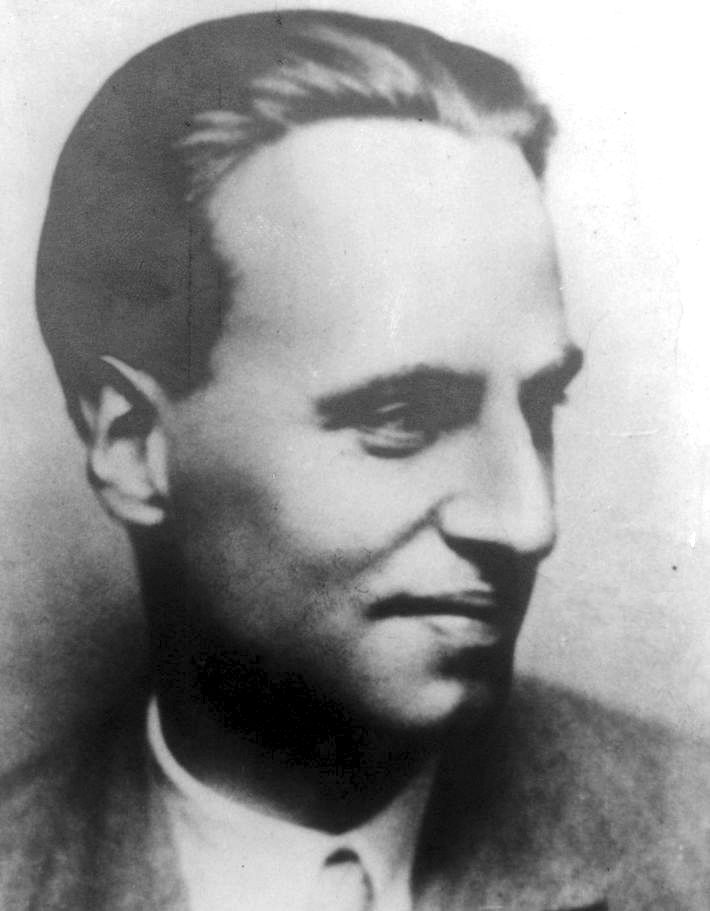
- Mart Stam 1920
- Born: 5 August 1899; Purmerend, The Netherlands
- Died: 21 February 1986 (aged 86); Zurich, Switzerland
- Citizenship: The Netherlands
- Occupations: Architect, urban planner, furniture designer
- Parent: Artie Stam
- Projects: Weissenhof Estate
- Design: Van Nelle Factory

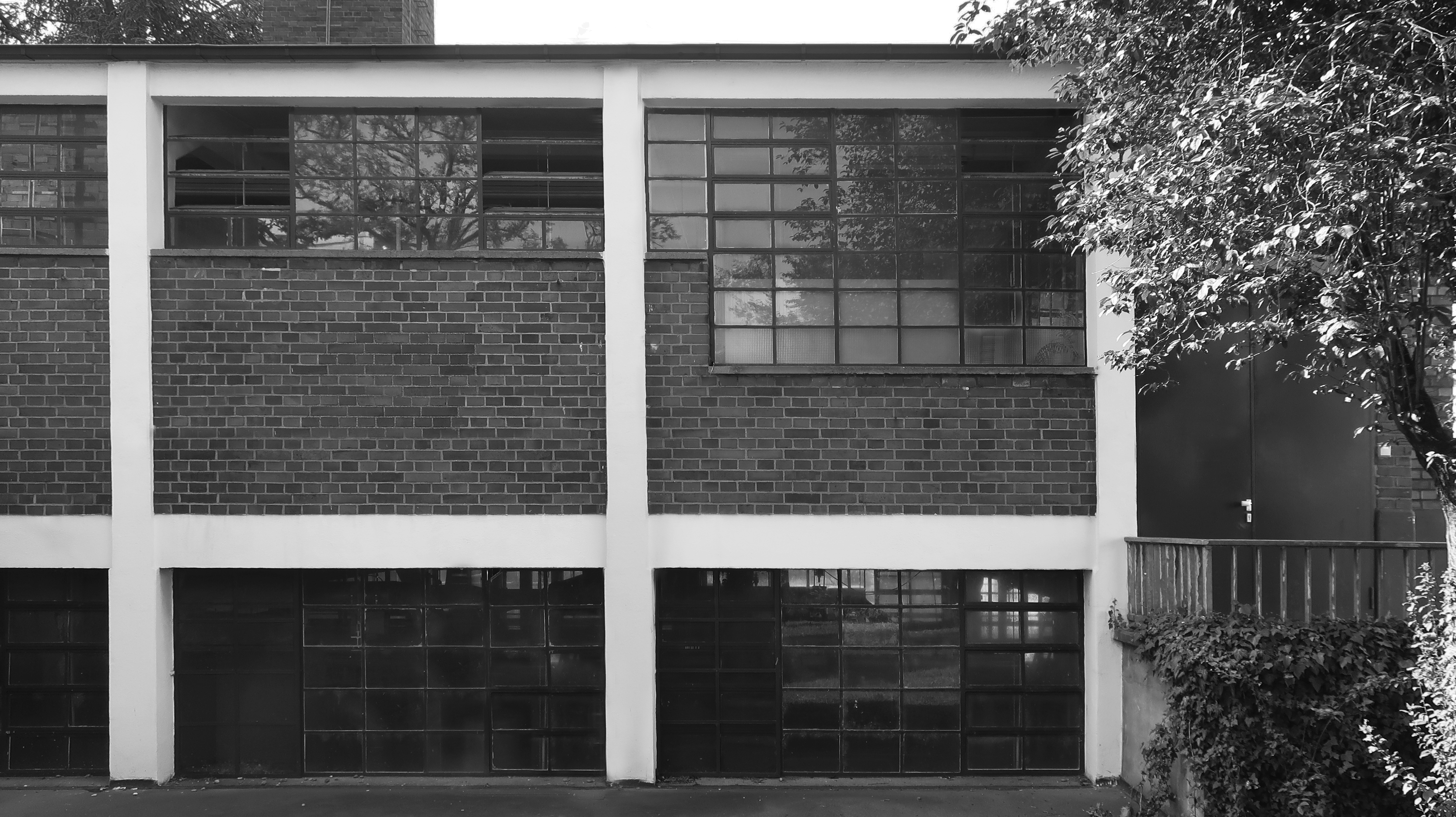
Heating plant Hellerhofsiedlung

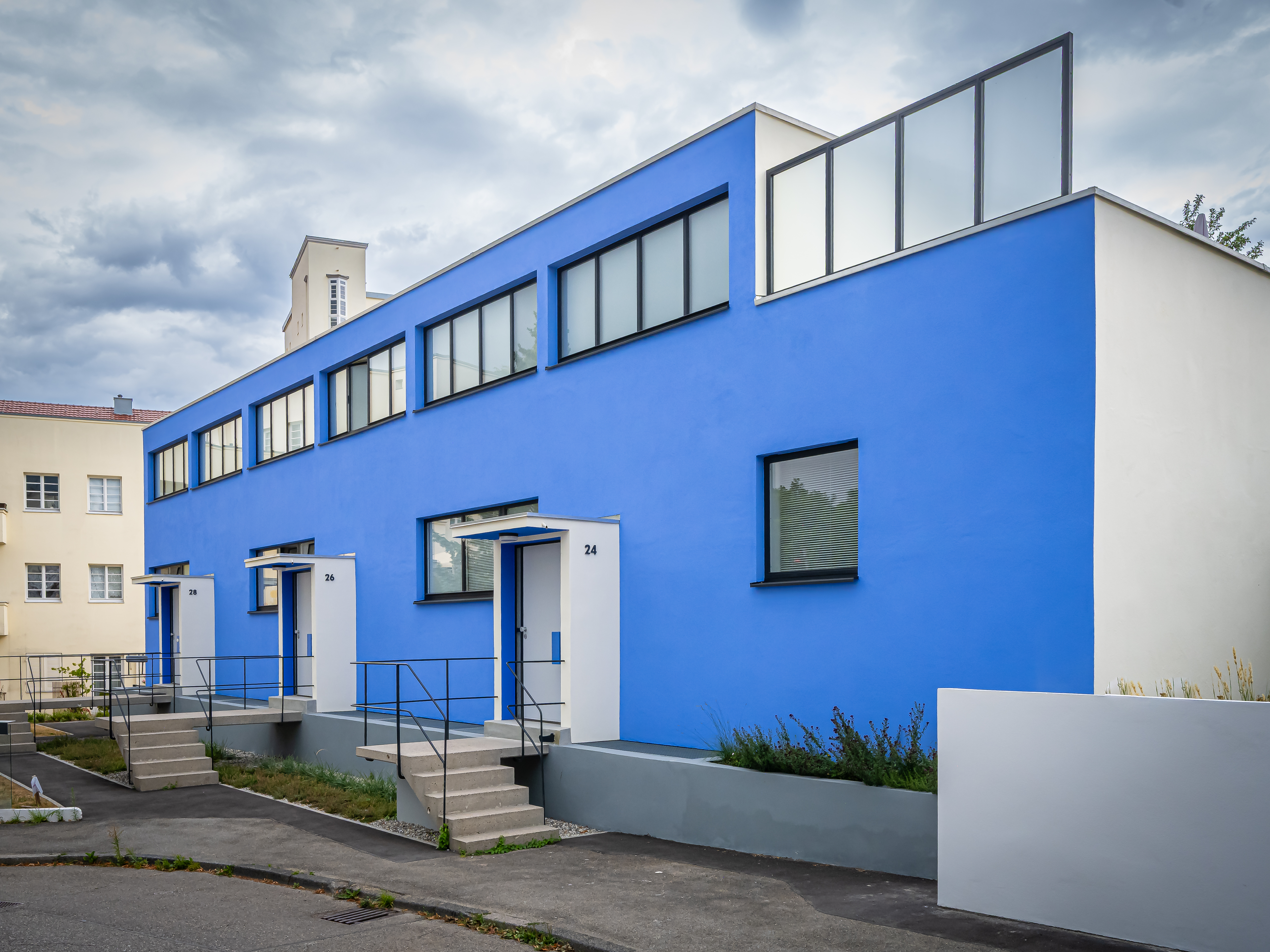
M. Stam: 1927 Residence for Weissenhof Estate exhibition, Stuttgart

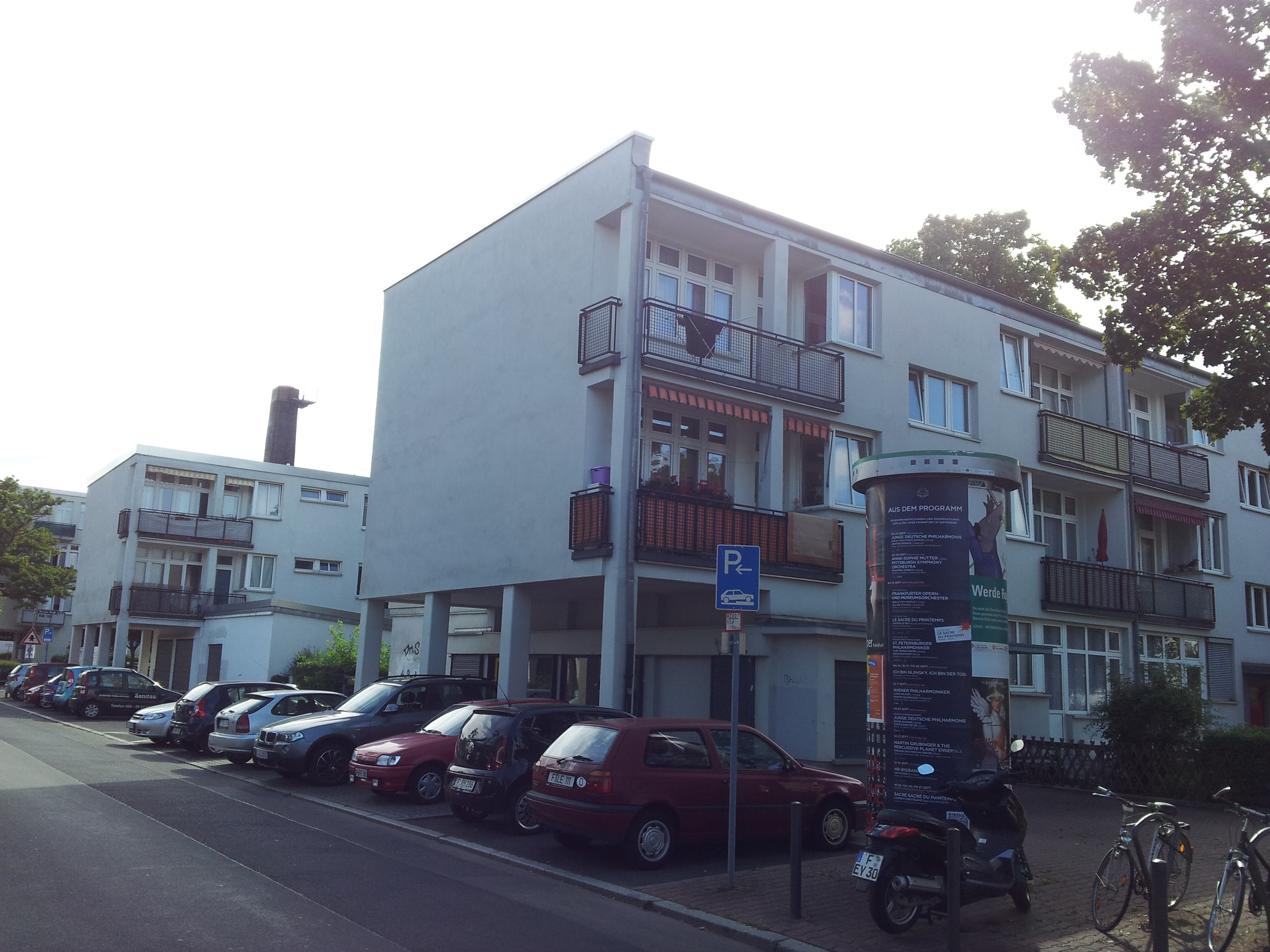
Large parts of the Hellerhof Estate in Frankfurt were designed by Mart Stam.

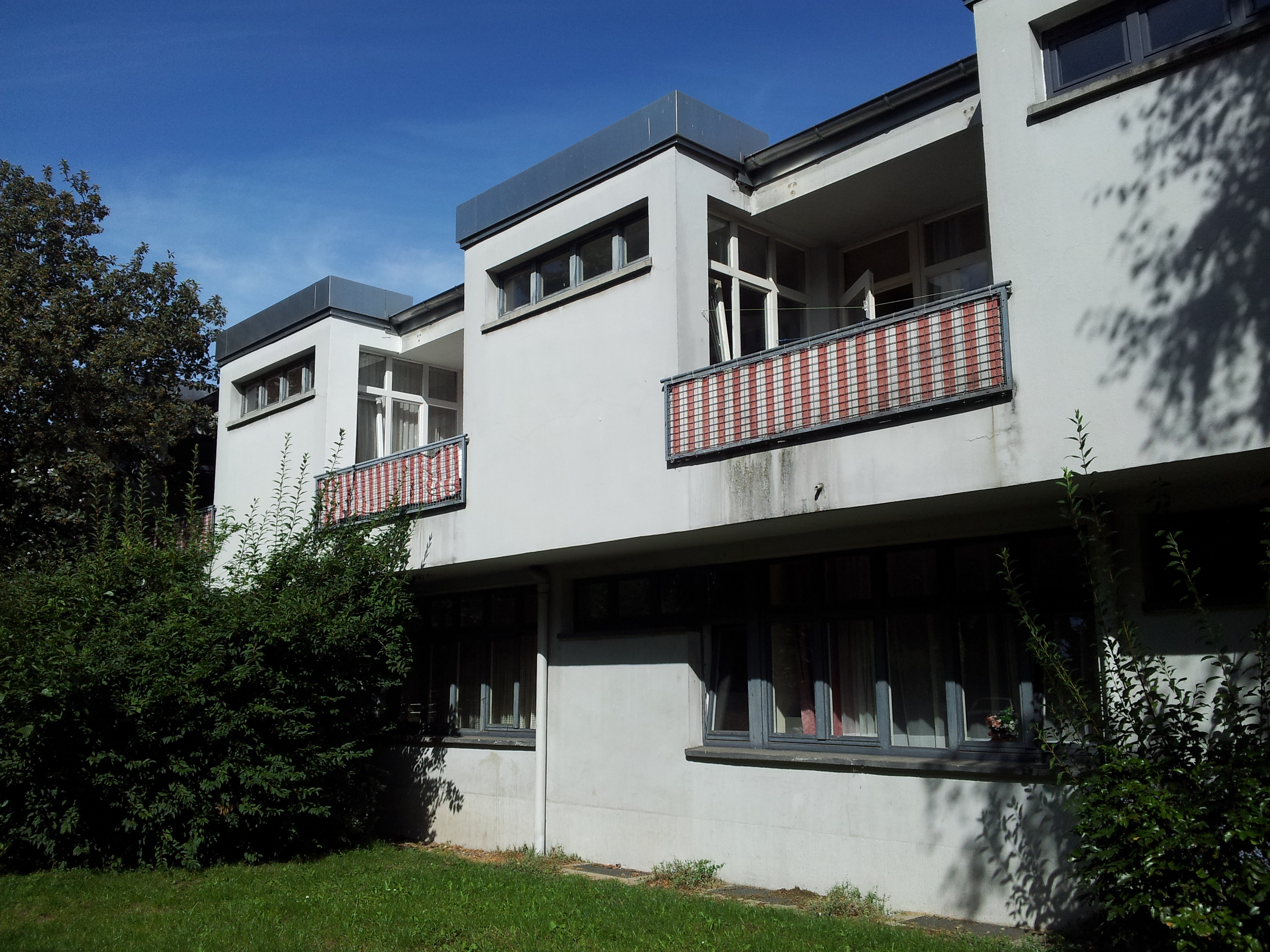
Detail at a building of the Hellerhof Estate

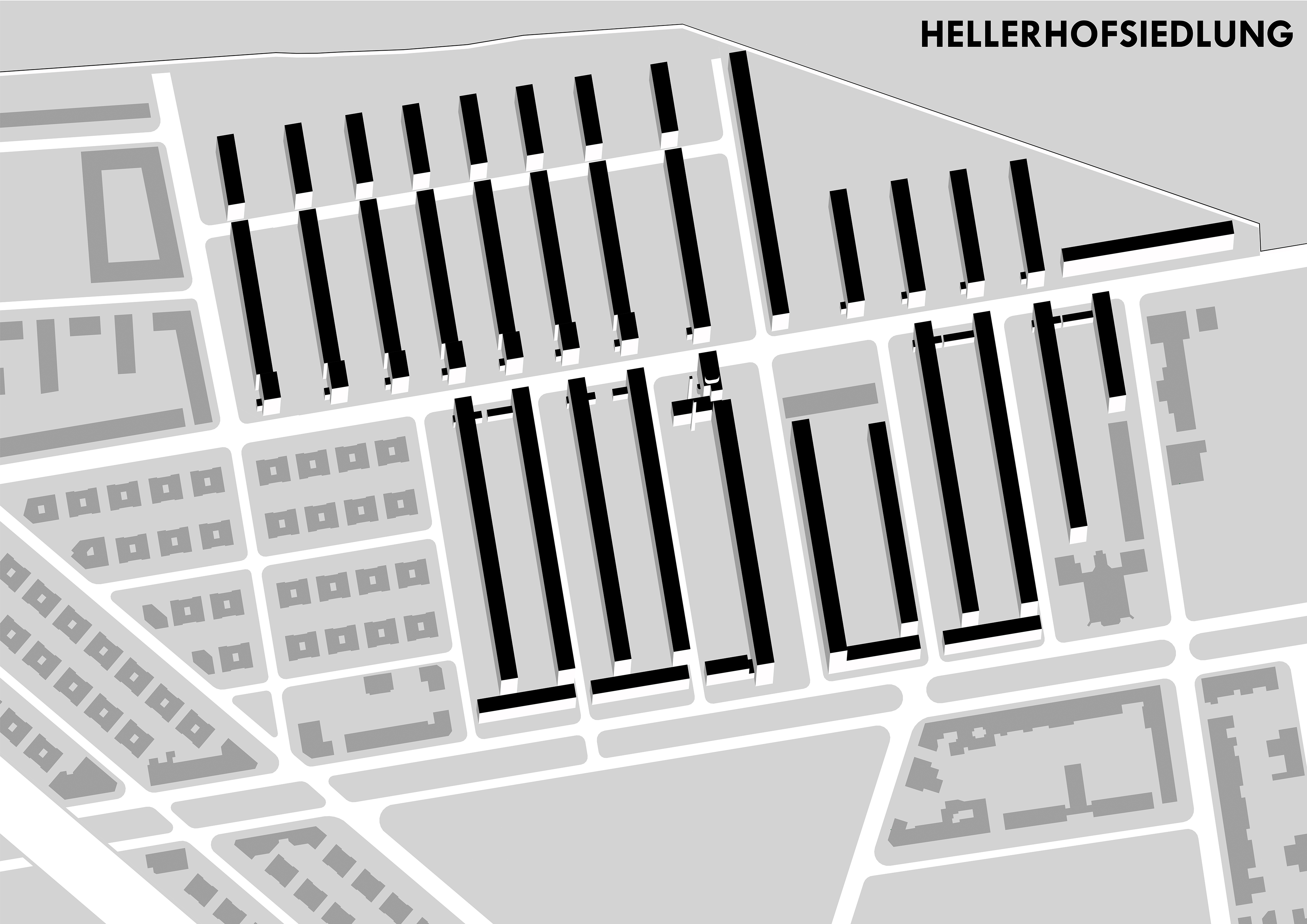
Hellerhof housing 1931

Palička Villa, designed 1928 by Mart Stam in the Baba housing project, Prague

Mart Stam participated in planning and designing the socialist city Magnitogorsk (around 1930/1931).

Mart Stam (5 August 1899 – 21 February 1986) was a Dutch architect, urban planner, and furniture designer. Stam was extraordinarily well-connected, and his career intersects with important moments in the history of 20th-century European architecture, including the invention of the cantilever chair, teaching at the Bauhaus, contributions to the Weissenhof Estate, the Van Nelle Factory, (an important modernist landmark in Rotterdam), buildings for Ernst May's New Frankfurt housing estates, followed by work in the USSR with the idealistic May Brigade, to teaching positions in Amsterdam and post-war East Germany. Upon return to the Netherlands he contributed to postwar reconstruction and finally retired, (or rather self-isolated), in Switzerland, where he died.

His design philosophy was inspired by both functionalism and scientific communism and his style of design is in line with the New Objectivity, an art movement formed during the depression in 1920s Germany, as a counter-movement and an outgrowth of expressionist architecture.

== Biography ==
=== Early life and education ===
Martinus Adrianus Stam was born in Purmerend, The Netherlands, on 5 August 1899 to a municipal tax collector, Arie Stam and his wife Alida Geertruida, née de Groot, who was very engaged socially. He attended a local school in Purmerend, before training in Amsterdam at the National Standard School for Education in Drawing (Rijksnormaalschool for Teekenonderwijs) for two years between 1917 and 1919.

After qualifying in 1919, Stam began working as a draftsman with an architectural firm in Rotterdam. He boldly stated between his qualification and first career that "We have to change the world". The architectural firm was run by the architect Granpré Molière. Granpré Molière was a traditionalist, and had a different style of design to Stam, but the two worked together well, possibly because they were both Christians, and Stam was invited to work for Granpré Molière personally in his studio in Rotterdam.

However, in 1920, Stam was imprisoned as a conscientious objector (dienstweigeren). Those who refused to conscript were imprisoned for the time period of which the service would take place. During his period of incarceration he wrote a pamphlet called Brieven uit de cel, (letters from prison), which was published by the Internationale Anti-Militaristische Vereeniging, (International Anti-Militarist Society). Fortunately, Stam was released early, after six months, and returned to the office of Granpré Molière. Later that year, in 1920, he entered an urban design competition to draw up city plans for the southwesterly expansion of the city of The Hague. The plan deviated from most entries in the sense that it was deliberately anti-monumental and predicated on a smooth flow of traffic. Its main striking feature was that the roads first ran parallel to the coast before curving west and terminating in parkland and the beach. These two concerns, i.e. that new modes of transport should govern city morphology, and that "all forms of embellishment or theatrical elements ought to be avoided" became mainstays in Mart Stam's oeuvre. The scheme was not awarded a prize, but Stam later self-published the design.

=== Pre-War Years in Germany ===
By the end of 1922, Stam had moved to Berlin, where he began to develop his style as a New Objectivity architect. His first major work in Berlin was under prominent architect Max Taut. Stam was assigned to design a variety of buildings across Germany, notably assisting Taut in the design of the German Trade Union Federation Building, Düsseldorf. During this time, he met the Russian avant-garde architect El Lissitzky. In 1924, Lissitzky had designed the striking Wolkenbügel, or cloud iron / sky hook, a t-shaped skyscraper supported on 3 metal framed columns, which appeared on the front cover of Adolf Behne's book, Der Moderne Zweckbau, and was published in further articles written by Lissitzky for the Moscow-based constructivist architectural review ASNOVA News (journal of ASNOVA, the Association of New Architects), and in the German art journal Das Kunstblatt. With Alfred Roth Stam reworked the Wolkenbügel design in concrete as a single raised bar on splayed truss legs. Although never built, both proposals were intended as socialist answers to the skyscrapers of America's capitalist cities. Deliberately horizontal in orientation, the buildings were set on the main intersections of Moscow's ring road and only rose to a relatively modest height as to form symbolic city gates. In 1924, Mart Stam co-founded the magazine ABC Beiträge zum Bauen in Basel (Contributions on Building) with Lissitzky, while Lissitzky was convalescing from tuberculosis. One of the features of this avant-garde magazine was its polemical use of Neue Sachlichkeit (New Objectivity) alternatives to contemporary architecture, and it would even rework proposals by other modernists to great effect. In spite of its limited print run it therefore became known as the magazine that brought modernism to Switzerland. Other editors, beside Stam and Lissitzky, were Swiss and included Hans Schmidt, the architect and future Bauhaus director Hannes Meyer, Hans Wittwer and Emil Roth.

Stam is also credited for at least part of the design of the Van Nelle Factory in Rotterdam, built from 1926 to 1930 (dates vary). This coffee and tea factory is still a powerful example of early modernist industrial architecture, recently rehabilitated into offices. An embarrassing dispute over the authorship of this design caused Stam to leave the office of Leendert van der Vlugt, the principal of the office and credited designer. In a letter to J.B. Bakema dated 10 June 1964 Stam qualifies himself as contributing designer with L.C. van der Vlugt having the end responsibility towards the client.

After moving to Berlin, Stam devised a steel-tubing cantilever chair, using lengths of standard gas pipe and standard pipe joint fittings. New research indicates that Stam was inspired by a cantilever tubular steel seat seen installed in a 1926 Tatra T12 two-door saloon car. Ludwig Mies van der Rohe became aware of Stam's work on the chair during planning for the Weissenhof Siedlung and mentioned it to Marcel Breuer at the Bauhaus. This led almost immediately to variations on the cantilevered tubular-steel chair theme by both Mies van der Rohe and Marcel Breuer, and began an entire genre of chair design. In the late 1920s, Breuer and Stam were involved in a patent lawsuit in German courts, both claiming to be the inventor of the basic cantilever chair design principle. Stam won the lawsuit, and, since that time, specific Breuer chair designs have often been erroneously attributed to Stam. In the United States, Breuer assigned the rights to his designs to Knoll, and for that reason it is possible to find the identical chair attributed to Stam in Europe and to Breuer in the U.S.

Stam contributed a house to the 1927 Weissenhof Estate, the permanent housing project developed and presented by the exhibition Die Wohnung ("The Dwelling"), organized by the Deutscher Werkbund in Stuttgart. This put him in the company of Le Corbusier, Peter Behrens, Bruno Taut, Hans Poelzig, and Walter Gropius, and the exhibition had as many as 20,000 visitors a day. In 1927, he became a founding member, with Gerrit Rietveld and Hendrik Petrus Berlage, of the Congrès Internationaux d'Architecture Moderne (CIAM).

In the late 1920s, Stam was part of the team at the New Frankfurt project. In 1930, Stam became one of the 20 architects and urban planners organized by Frankfurt city planner Ernst May who traveled together to the Soviet Union to create a string of new modernist cities in the Stalinist Soviet Union, including Magnitogorsk. The May Brigade included Austrian architect Margarete Schütte-Lihotzky, her husband Wilhelm Schütte, Arthur Korn, Erich Mauthner and Hans Schmidt. Stam was there in February 1931 to participate in the struggle to build rational worker housing from the ground up, an effort ultimately defeated by adverse weather, corruption, and poor design decisions. Stam moved to planning activities in Makeyevka in Ukraine in 1932, then to Orsk, with his friend Hans Schmidt (again) and with Bauhaus student and future wife Lotte Beese, then to the copper-mining Soviet city of Balgash. Stam returned to the Netherlands in 1934.

=== Return to the Netherlands and World War II ===
Between 1934 and 1948, Stam attempted to gain a foothold in his home country again. From 1934, Stam cultivated a friendship with the director of the Stedelijk Museum in Amsterdam, Willem Sandberg, which led to job opportunities and creative commissions. He became part of the editorial board of the New Objectivity journal De 8 and Opbouw (The 8 and Construction, (literally: Building Up). In the years 1935/36, he worked at the office of Willem van Tijen, a prominent Dutch modernist architect. He initiated the design of a row of five drive-in houses with his wife Lotte Beese and van Tijen in Amsterdam South, once again exploring the expression of mobility in an innovative manner. During this time Stam entered various design competitions, amongst others for the City Hall of Amsterdam (with W. van Tijen, H.A. Maaskant and L. Stam-Beese), which garnered praise from Le Corbusier., and the Dutch Pavilion for the 1939 World Exhibition in New York. Although Stam won this invited competition, the project went to the traditionalist architect D.F. Slothouwer, who was friends with the government official overseeing the Dutch contribution. This in spite of protests from the Dutch art community and the director of MoMA, Alfred Barr. In 1939, upon referral of Sandberg, Stam became director of the Instituut voor Kunstnijverheidsonderwijs, IvKNO in Amsterdam (Institute for Applied Arts, and the predecessor to the current Rietveld Academy). During the Nazi occupation Mart Stam used his position at the school to employ activities in the Dutch resistance. He divorced his second wife Lotte Beese in 1943 and married Olga Heller in 1946. She was a Jewish employee at the Institute who was forced into hiding during the war. Stam established the magazine Open Oog (Open Eye) with Sandberg in 1946, and contemplated leaving the school. In 1948 he took up a position in Dresden, East Germany to reorganize and combine the Hochschule für Werkkunst (College for Applied Arts) and the Akademie für bildende Künste (Academy for the Arts).

=== After World War II ===
From 1948 to 1952, he moved to postwar East Germany, with its major reconstruction projects. In 1948, he took a professorship at the Akademie der Bildenden Künste Dresden and began advocating a modern, strict structure for the heavily destroyed urban landscape, a plan which most of the citizens rejected as an "all-out attack on the identity of the city", and which would have obliterated most of the remaining landmarks. In 1950, Stam became director of the Advanced Institute of Art in Berlin. Returning to Amsterdam in 1953, Stam and his wife moved to Switzerland in 1966 and withdrew from public view. He died, aged 86, in Zurich.

=== Estate ===
Mart Stam's complete estate is kept at the Deutsches Architekturmuseum DAM in Frankfurt am Main.
