= Adolf Gustav Schneck =

German architect (1883–1971)

Adolf Gustav Friedrich Schneck (1883, Esslingen am Neckar –1971, Schmiden) was a German architect and furniture designer as well as a member of the Deutscher Werkbund and teacher at the Bauhaus. He contributed two buildings to the 1927 Weissenhofsiedlung exhibit and has work in the collection of the Museum of Modern Art.

During the Nazi regime, he became a member of the Nazi Party and a professor at the Württemberg Academy of Fine Arts. After the war, he was examined during denazification hearings, and was found to be a Mitläufer (a follower, but of lesser culpability). He was fined but was permitted to retain his professorship.

In 1954, Schneck received an invitation to Turkey, where the Turkish Ministry of Education commissioned him to establish State School of Applied Arts (Devlet Tatbiki Guzel Sanatlar Yuksek Okulu) in Istanbul. This project was completed in 1958. The following year, in 1959, Schneck was awarded the Grand Cross of Merit of the Federal Republic of Germany.

== Publications ==
- Das Mobel als Gebrauchs-Gegenstand (Furniture as a Commodity) (Stuttgart: Julius Hoffmann Verlag, 1929)
