= Van der Vlugt =

van der Vlugt is a surname. Notable people with the surname include:

- Willem van der Vlugt (1732-1807), director of the Teylers Stichting
- Bartel Willem van der Vlugt (1763–1939), director of the Teylers Stichting and son of Willem van der Vlugt (1732).
- Willem van der Vlugt (1787-1849), director of the Teylers Stichting and son of Bartel Willem van der Vlugt (1763).
- Vincent van der Vlugt (1802–1867), director of the Teylers Stichting and son of Bartel Willem van der Vlugt (1763).
- Jan van der Vlugt (1823–1889), director of the Teylers Stichting and son of Willem van der Vlugt (1787).
- Willem van der Vlugt (1853-1928), Dutch professor and parliamentarian
- Jan Willem van der Vlugt (1890–1963), director of Teylers Stichting and son of Willem van der Vlugt (1853).
- Leendert van der Vlugt (1894–1936), Dutch architect
- Abraham Jan Theodoor van der Vlugt (1894–1954), Dutch Minister of State and ambassador
- Fred van der Vlugt (1930–2002), Dutch journalist and brother of Bram van der Vlugt
- Bram van der Vlugt (1934–2020), Dutch actor
- Marijne van der Vlugt (1965), Dutch musician and daughter of Bram van der Vlugt
- Simone van der Vlugt (1966), Dutch writer
- Rolf van der Vlugt (1981), Dutch kite surfer
