= Sonneveld House =

Museum in Rotterdam, the Netherlands

- Sonneveld House in 2016
- Interactive map of Sonneveld House
- 51.91556°N 4.47222°E
- Location: Rotterdam, the Netherlands

Sonneveld House is a museum house in Rotterdam, the Netherlands. It was designed in the early 1930s by the architecture firm Brinkman en Van der Vlugt, and has been named as a example of Nieuwe Bouwen, a Dutch version of functionalist housing. It is currently managed by Het Nieuwe Instituut.

== History ==
Located in the Museum Park (formerly Land van Hoboken), the house was originally built for Albertus Sonneveld, one of the directors of the Van Nelle factory, who commisionned the project from local architects Johannes Brinkman and Leendert Van der Vlugt in 1929. As the project was commisioned during the first year of the crisis ignited by the 1929 stock market crash, the architects devoted much time to its design, including furnishings by the designer/manufacturer Gispen and fabrics by the firm Metz & Co and even deciding how the furniture was to be arranged.

When the family moved in 1933, they brought almost nothing from their old house. The house also featured a set of new and unusual gadgets, including an audio system for every room, electronic devices to call the servants, and a elevator to bring wood from the basement to the fireplace in the living room.

The project has been named one of the most prominent early examples of Nieuwe Bouwen, an early-20th-century Dutch architecture style whose defining qualities have been described as “light, air and space.”

In 2001, the house was opened to the public after restoration work and refurbishment to recreate its original condition and interior. This was largely achieved with objects owned by the Sonneveld heirs, among them furniture and lamps, as well as personal belongings acquired by the family when they lived in the house from 1933 to 1955.

Since 2013, the museum has hosted exhibitions curated by artists such as Dominique Gonzales Foerster, Eva Rothschild, Santiago Borja, Richard Hutten and Petra Blaisse.
