= Johannes Brinkman =

Dutch architect (1902 - 1949)

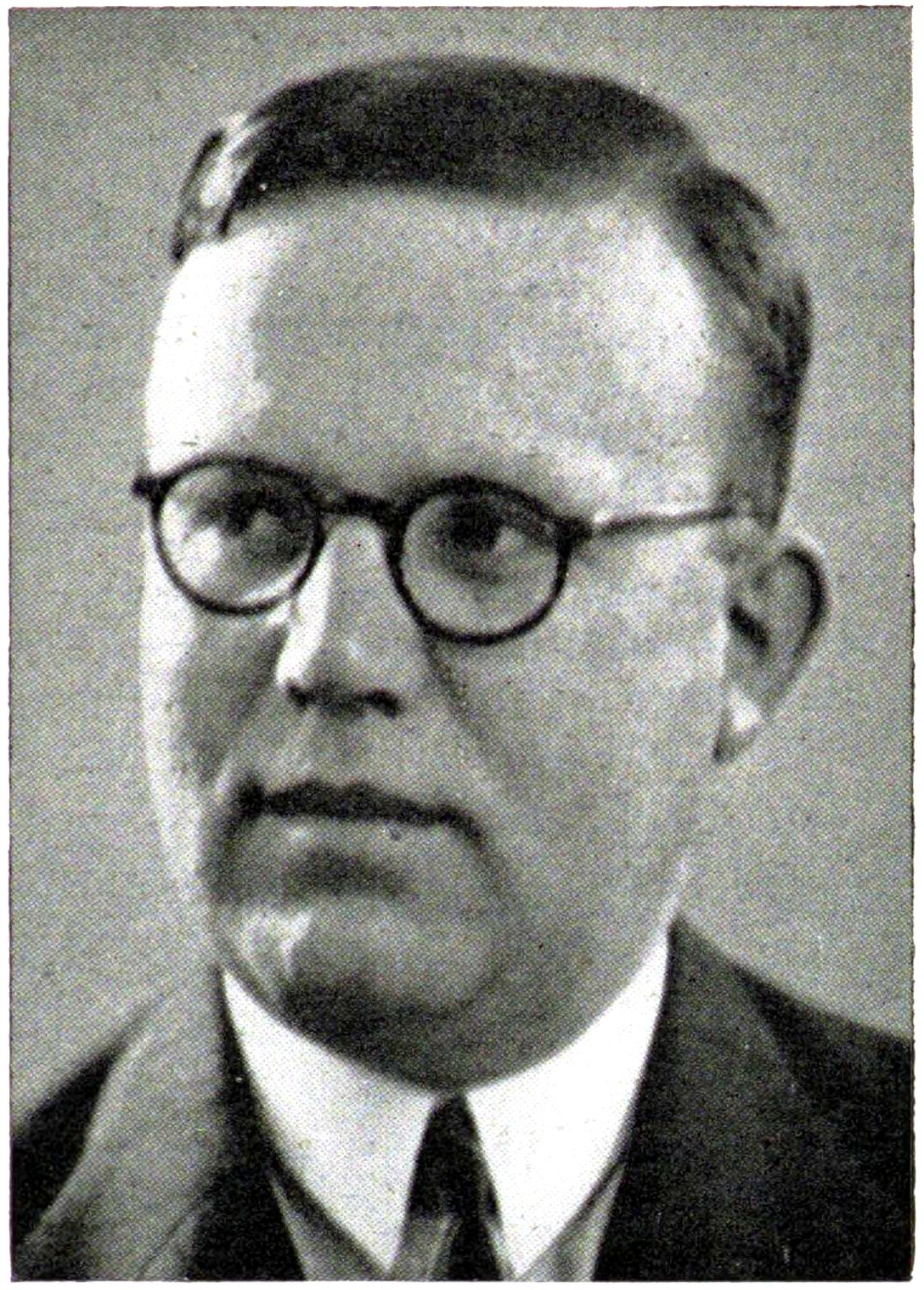
Ir. Johannes Andreas Brinkman

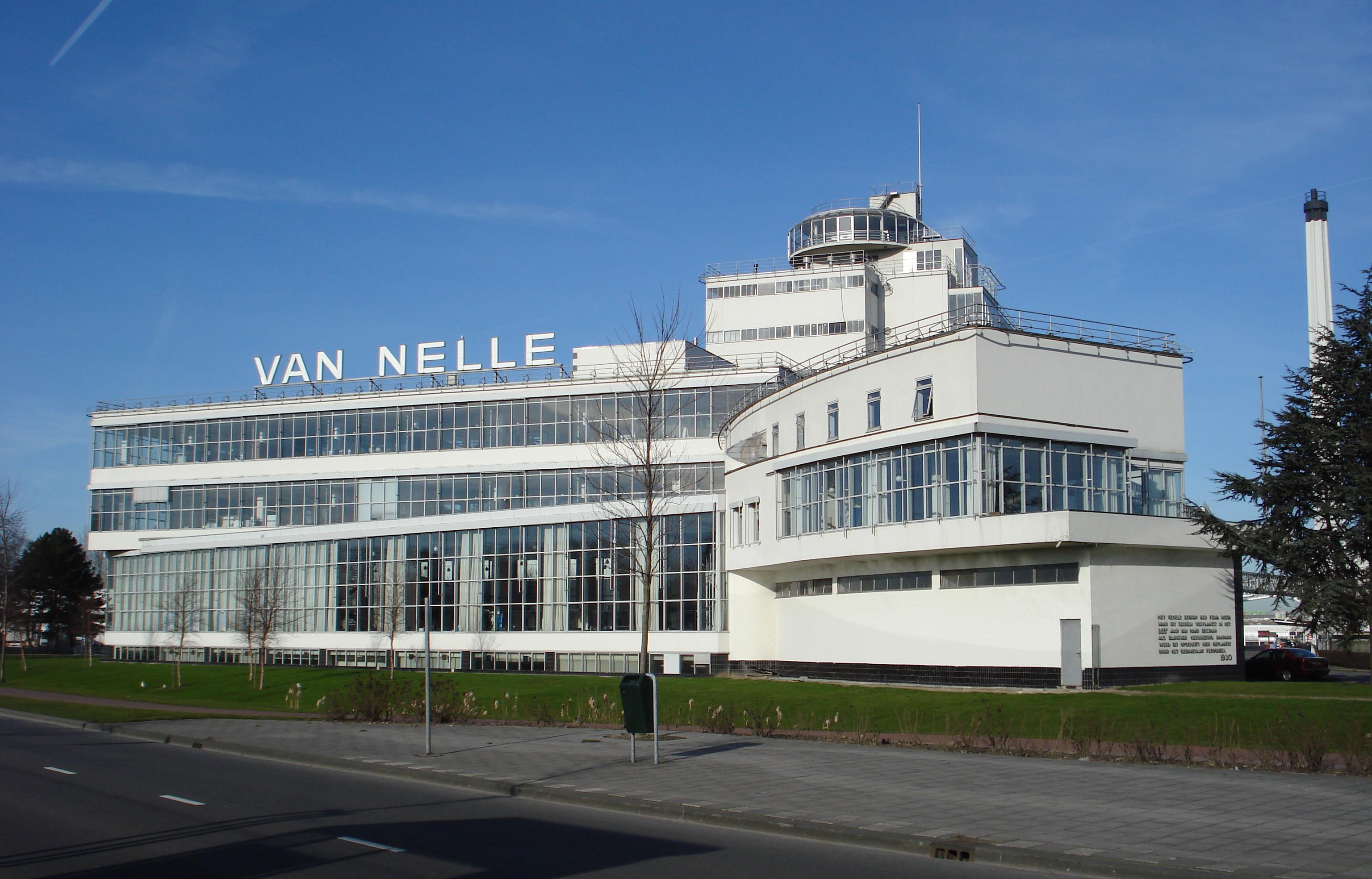
Van Nelle Factory, Rotterdam

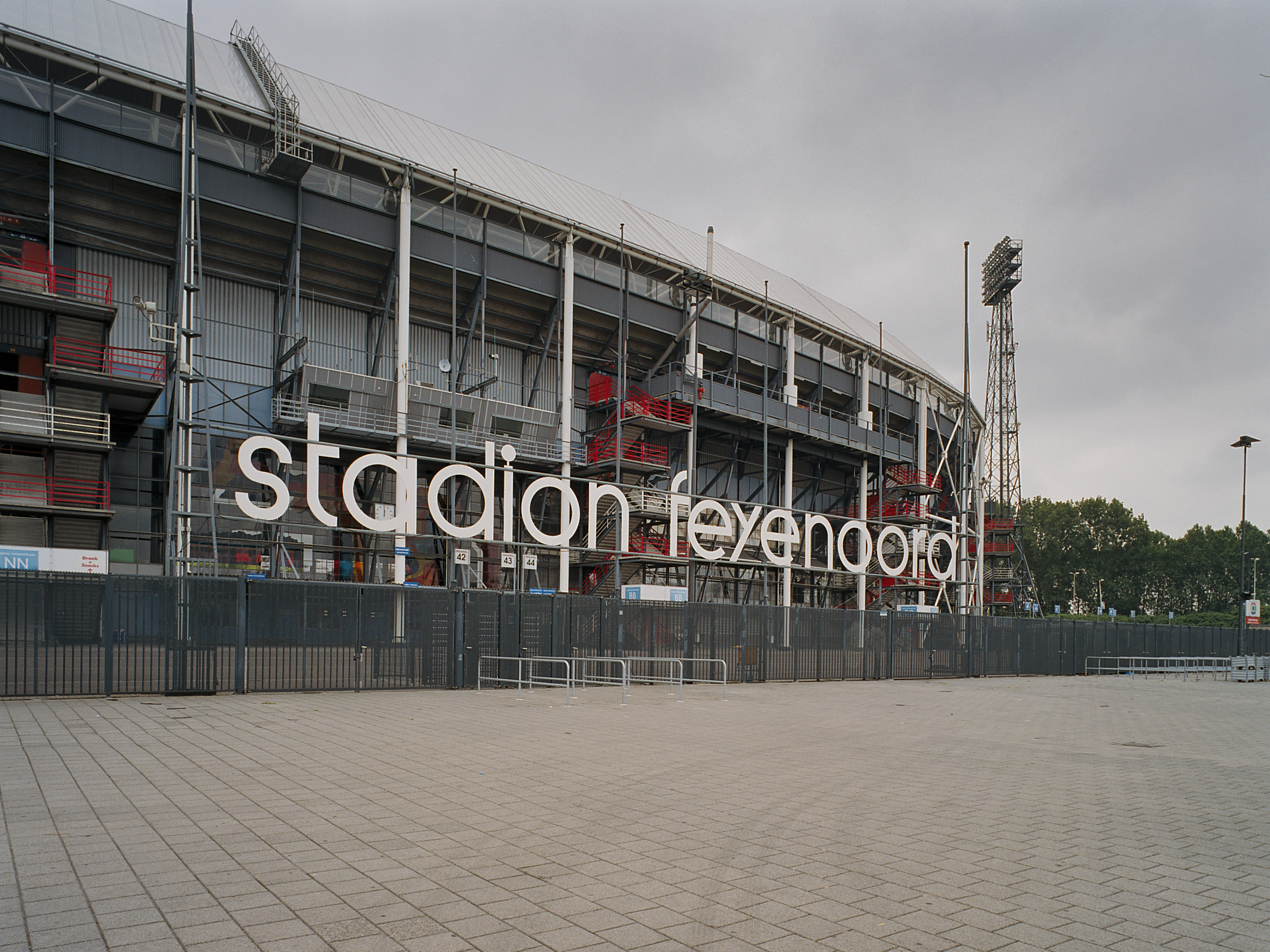
Stadion Feyenoord, Rotterdam

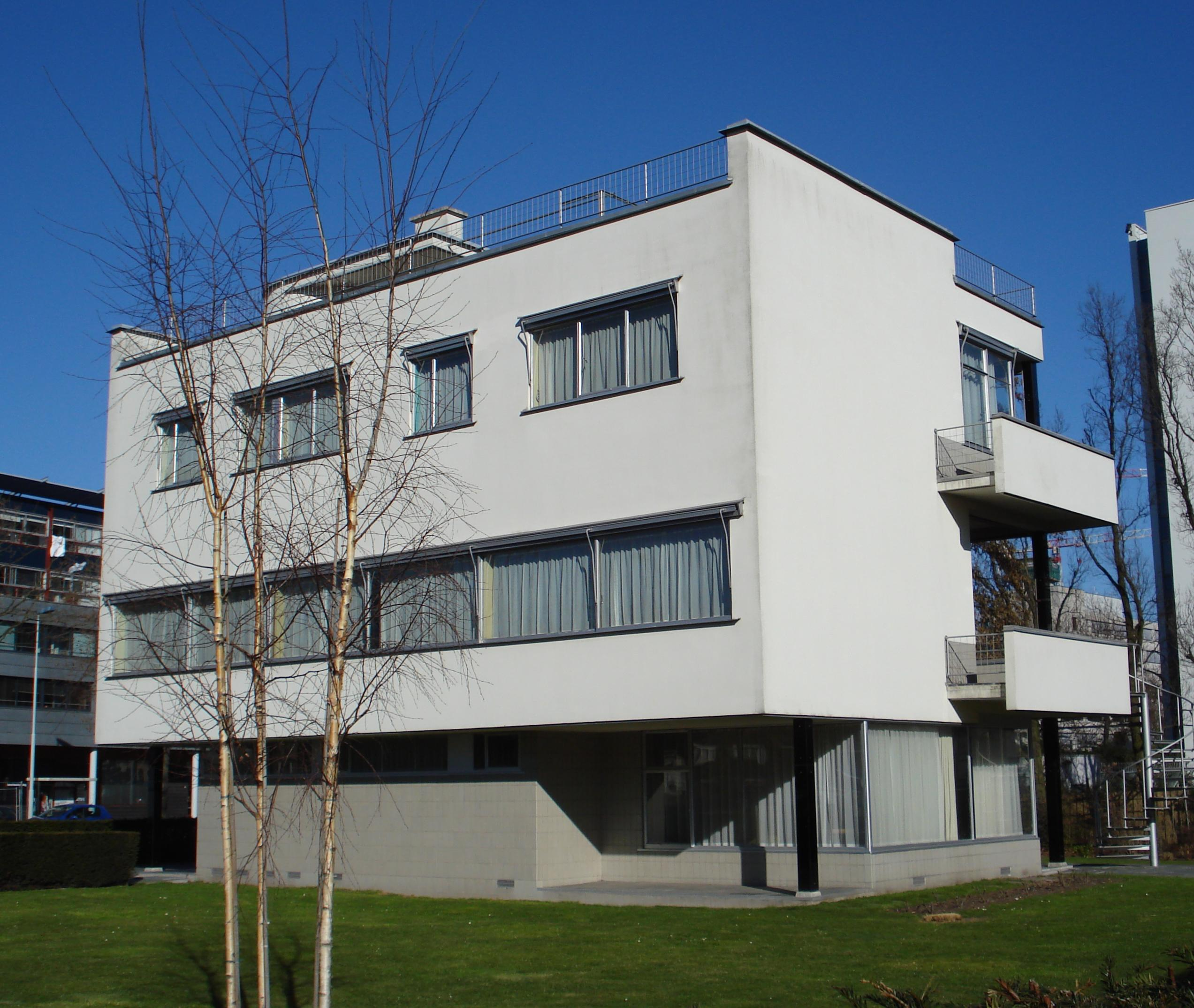
Sonneveld House, Rotterdam

Johannes Andreas Brinkman (22 March 1902 – 6 May 1949), also known as Jan Brinkman, was a Dutch architect and exponent of Nieuwe Bouwen, modern architecture in the Netherlands.

== Early life and education ==
Johannes Andreas Brinkman, known s "Jan", was born in Rotterdam, Netherlands, in 1902. He was the son of architect Michiel Brinkman (1873–1925), who established a firm in Rotterdam in 1910 and was known for designing the Spangen neighbourhood of Rotterdam in 1922.

Johannes studied civil engineering at the Delft University of Technology (Dutch: Technische Universiteit Delft).

== Career ==
After the death of his father in 1925, Brinkman took charge of his architectural firm and entered into a partnership with architect Leendert van der Vlugt. The results of that collaboration include the Van Nelle Factory and the Feijenoord Stadion.

After the death of Van der Vlugt in 1936, Brinkman teamed up with architect Johannes Hendrik van den Broek. The firm's work during this time including a new Rotterdam Cruise Terminal for the Holland-America Line.

== Death ==
Brinkman died on 6 May 1949. Architect Jaap Bakema joined the firm, which in 1951 was renamed Architectenbureau Van den Broek en Bakema and today is known as Broekbakema.

== Works ==
- Van der Leeuw House, Rotterdam (1930)
- Van Nelle Factory, Rotterdam (1931)
- Sonneveld House, Rotterdam (1932)
- Stadion Feyenoord, Rotterdam (1937)
- Cruise Terminal, Rotterdam (1946)

== See also ==
- List of Dutch architects
