= Van Nelle Factory =

Former industrial complex in Rotterdam

Coordinates: 51°55′22″N 4°26′1″E

- Van Nellefabriek
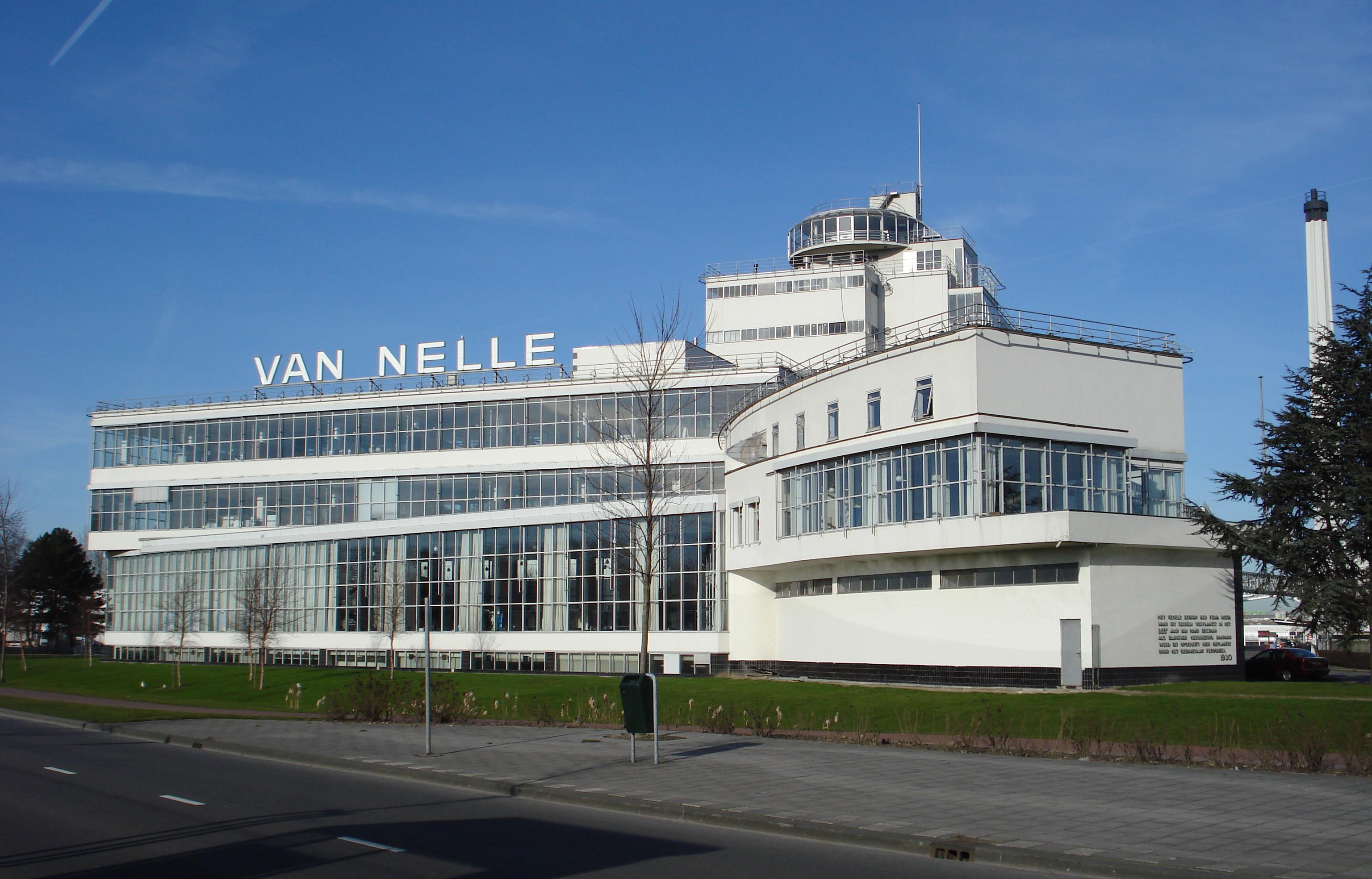

General information
- Type: Factory
- Architectural style: Modern (Nieuwe Bouwen)
- Location: Rotterdam, Netherlands, Van Nelleweg 1
- Construction started: 1925
- Completed: 1931
- Owner: Virgata Group

Design and construction
- Architects: Leendert van der Vlugt; Johannes Brinkman

UNESCO World Heritage Site
- Official name: Van Nellefabriek
- Type: Cultural
- Criteria: ii, iv
- Designated: 2014 (38th session)
- Reference no.: 1441
- Region: Europe and North America

The former Van Nelle Factory (Dutch: Van Nellefabriek) on the Schie in Rotterdam, is considered a prime example of the modernist and functionalist architecture. It has been a designated UNESCO World Heritage Site since 2014. Soon after it was built, prominent architects described the factory as "the most beautiful spectacle of the modern age" (Le Corbusier in 1932) and "a poem in steel and glass" (Robertson in 1930).

== History ==
Built between 1925 and 1931, the buildings were designed by architect Leendert van der Vlugt from the Brinkman & Van der Vlugt office in cooperation with civil engineer J.G. Wiebenga, at that time a specialist for constructions in reinforced concrete. It is an example of Nieuwe Bouwen, modernist architecture in the Netherlands. It was commissioned by the co-owner of the Van Nelle company, Cees van der Leeuw, on behalf of the owners. Van der Leeuw and both company directors, Matthijs de Bruyn and Bertus Sonneveld, were so impressed by the skills of Van der Vlugt that they commissioned him to design and build private houses for themselves in Rotterdam and nearby Schiedam between 1928 and 1932. The fully renovated Sonneveld House is now a museum in the center of Rotterdam, with more than 30,000 annual visitors from all over the world.

In the 20th century, it was a factory, processing coffee, tea, and tobacco and, later on, also chewing gum, cigarettes, instant pudding, and rice.

In 1989, Van Nelle was bought by Sara Lee/Douwe Egberts, and the Van Nelle brand was transferred to Douwe Egberts Nederland. and all the Van Nelle production facilities closed in 1996. In 1998, Imperial Tobacco Group bought the Douwe Egberts Van Nelle, its tobacco unit.

Initially, after the renovation it was known as the Van Nelle Design Factory ("Van Nelle Ontwerpfabriek" in Dutch). More recently, the narrow focus on tenants in the design and architecture sectors has been abandoned. Currently, the building houses various companies and a modern co-working space. Some of the areas are used for meetings, conventions, and events.

Eric Gude, a Dutch specialist in the conversion of former industrial sites, planned and organized this change of use for the Van Nelle factory in 1997 and introduced Wessel de Jonge, an authority on the renovation of modern architecture in 1999, to coordinate the overall renovation, which began in the year 2000.

In 2015, the Van Nelle Factory topped the list of The 25 Most Beautiful Factories in the World.

== Architecture ==
Van Nelle Factory is an icon of modernist and functionalist architecture. The main contributor to the factory's design was Leendert van der Vlugt, while after his death the design was often referenced to Johannes Brinkman and Mart Stam. Mart Stam, who worked in 1926 as a draughtsman at the Brinkman & Van der Vlugt office in Rotterdam, came in contact with the Russian Avant-Garde in 1922 in Berlin. In 1926 Mart Stam organized an architecture tour of the Netherlands for the Russian artist El Lissitzky and his wife Sophie Küppers, a collector of avant-garde art. They visited Jacobus Oud, Cornelis van Eesteren, Gerrit Rietveld, and other artists. Sophie Küppers stated that Mart Stam spoke about 'his' factory during that trip. After a dispute over the authorship of the van Nelle Factory, Mart Stam left the office of the credited designer Leendert van der Vlugt.

It is claimed that the building featured the first industrially prefabricated curtain wall in the world.

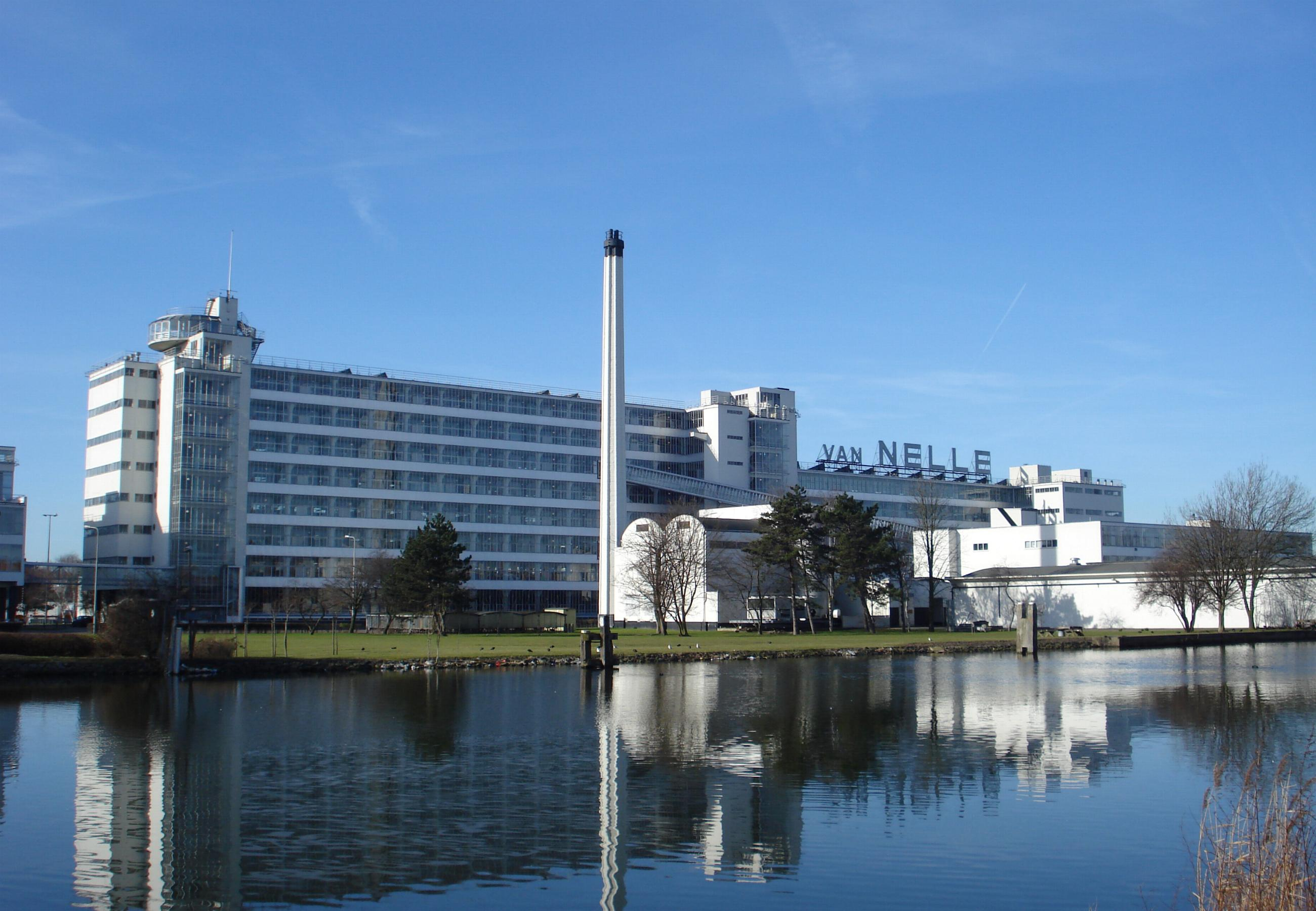
Rear view of the complex

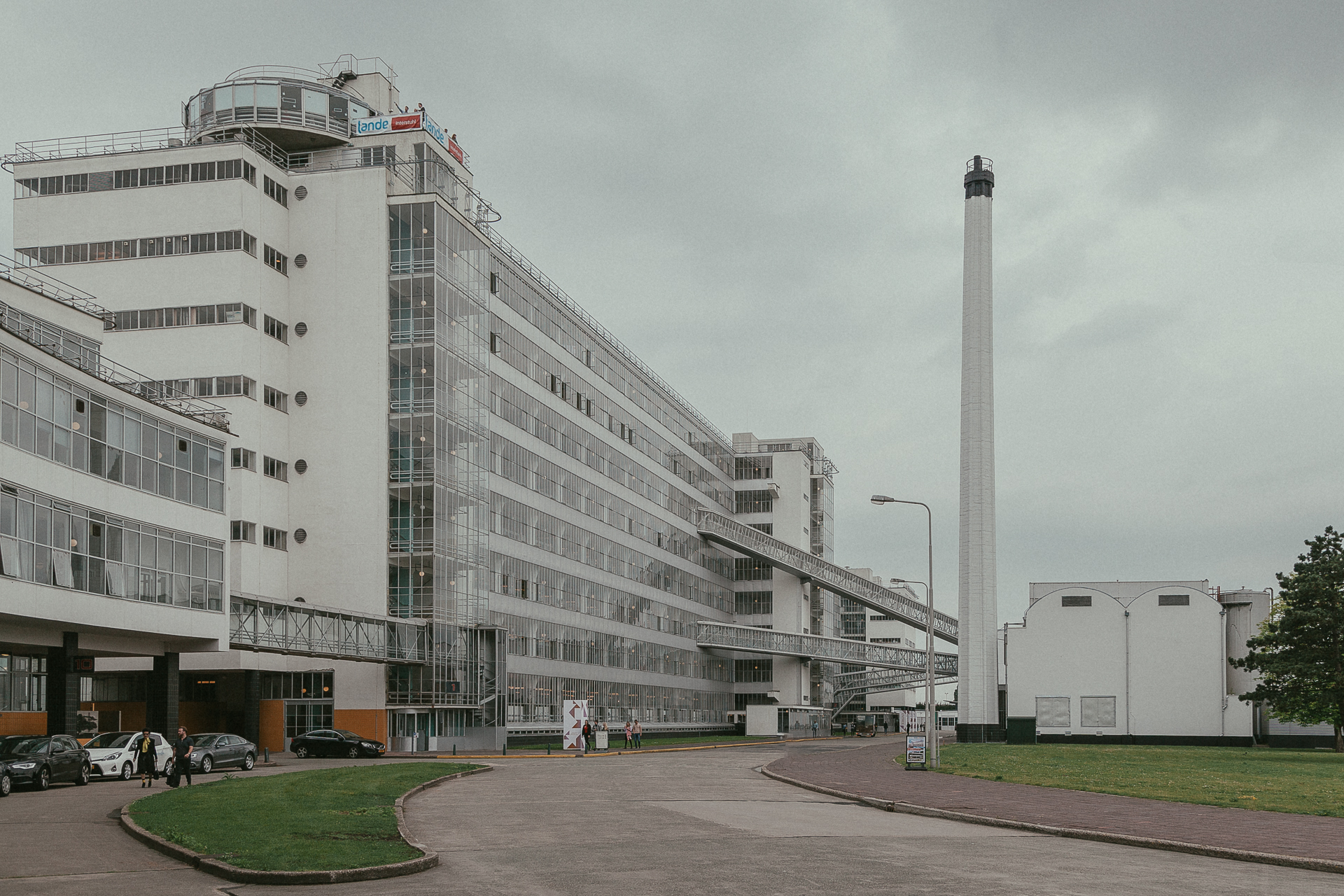
The front façade

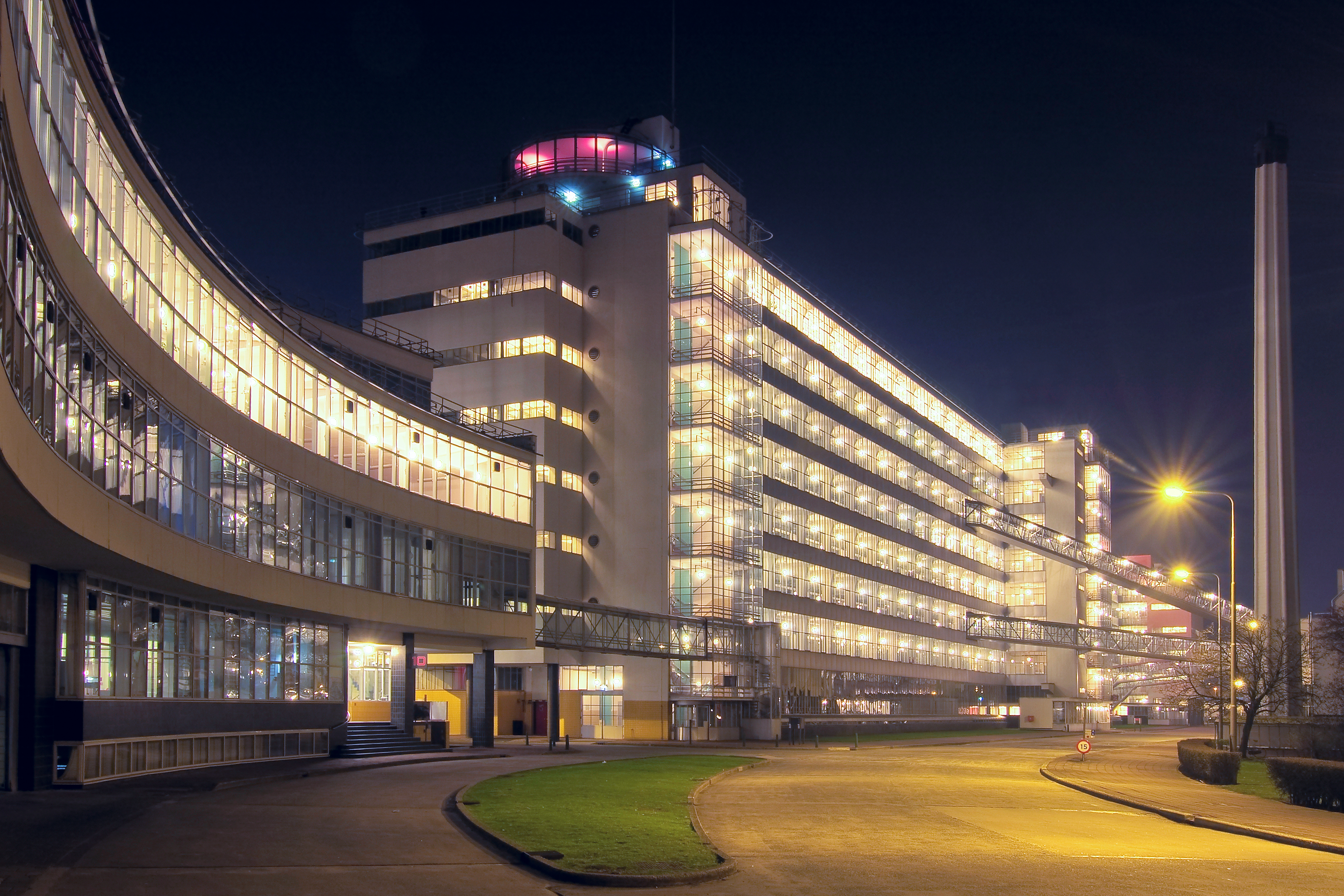
View from the entrance gate by night

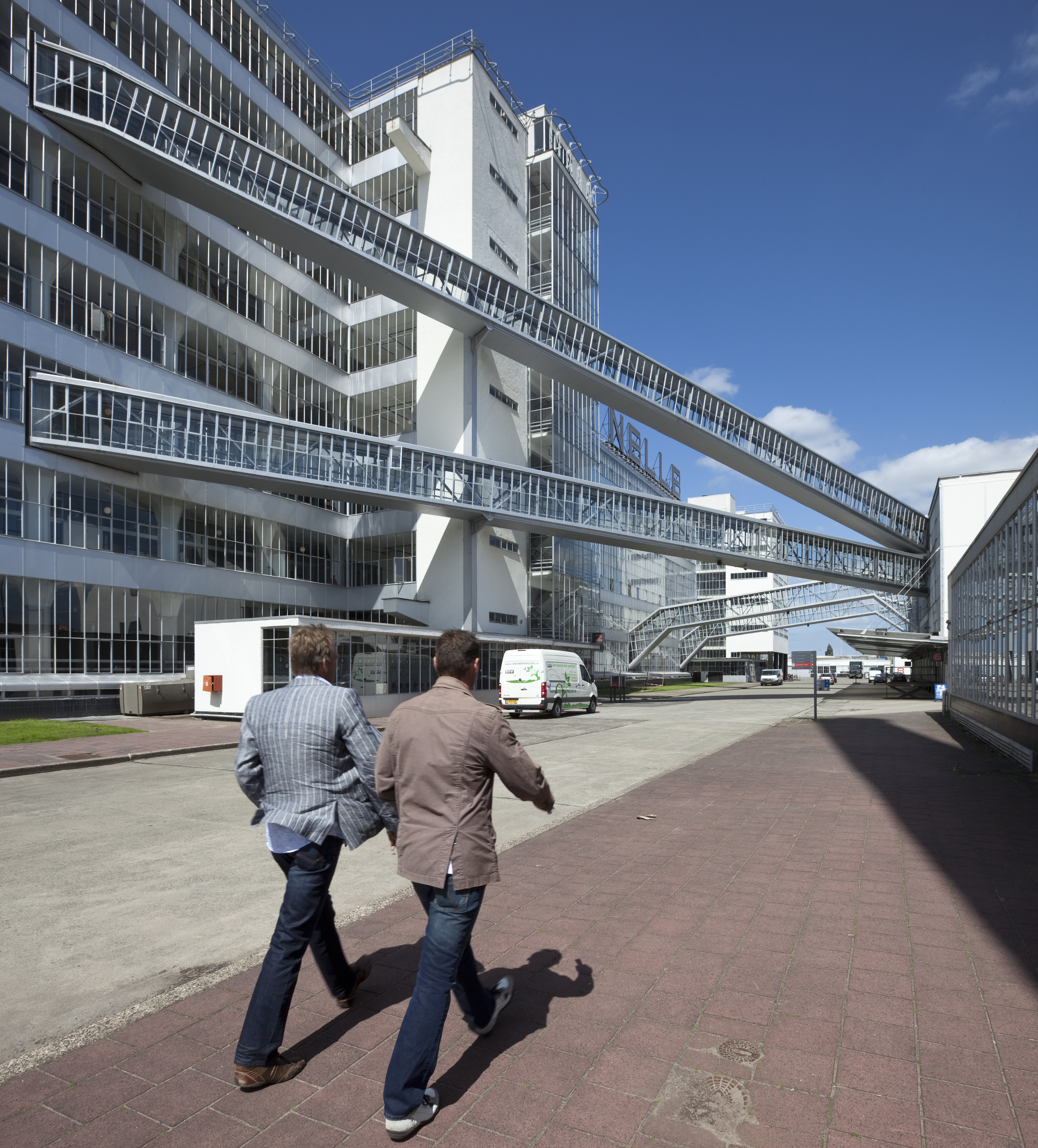
The four transport bridges

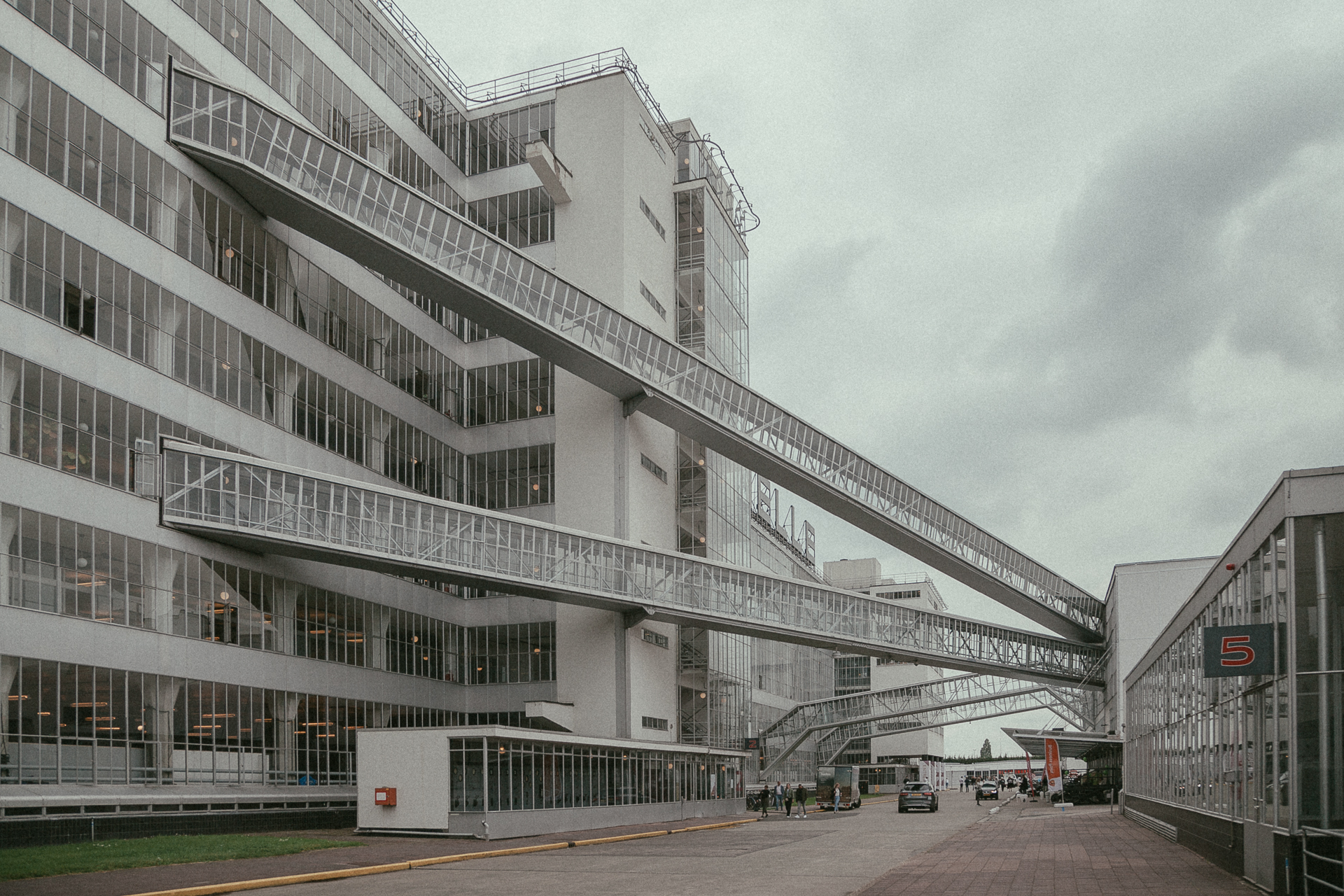
Transport bridges

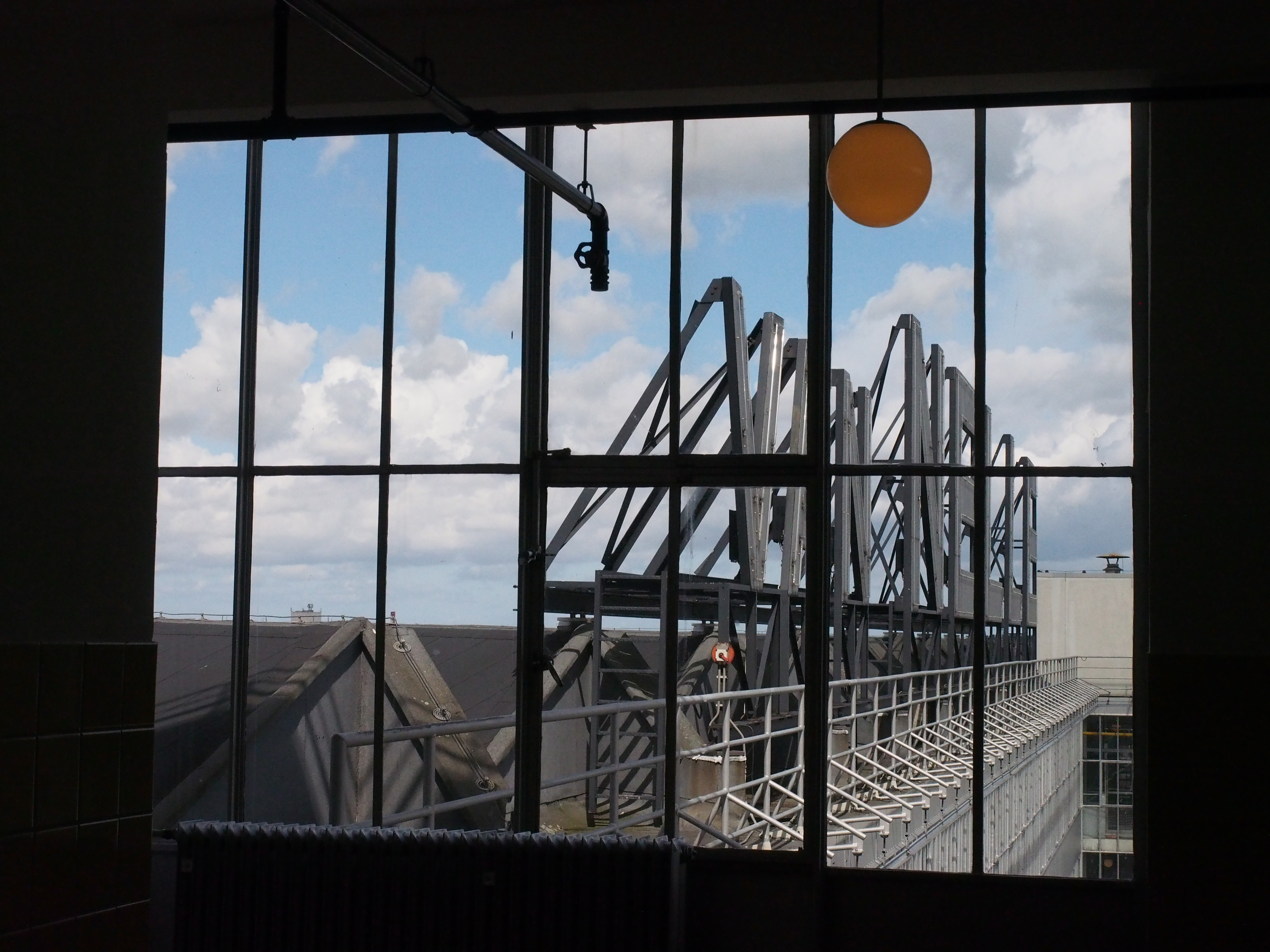
Van Nelle neon lettering seen from inside.

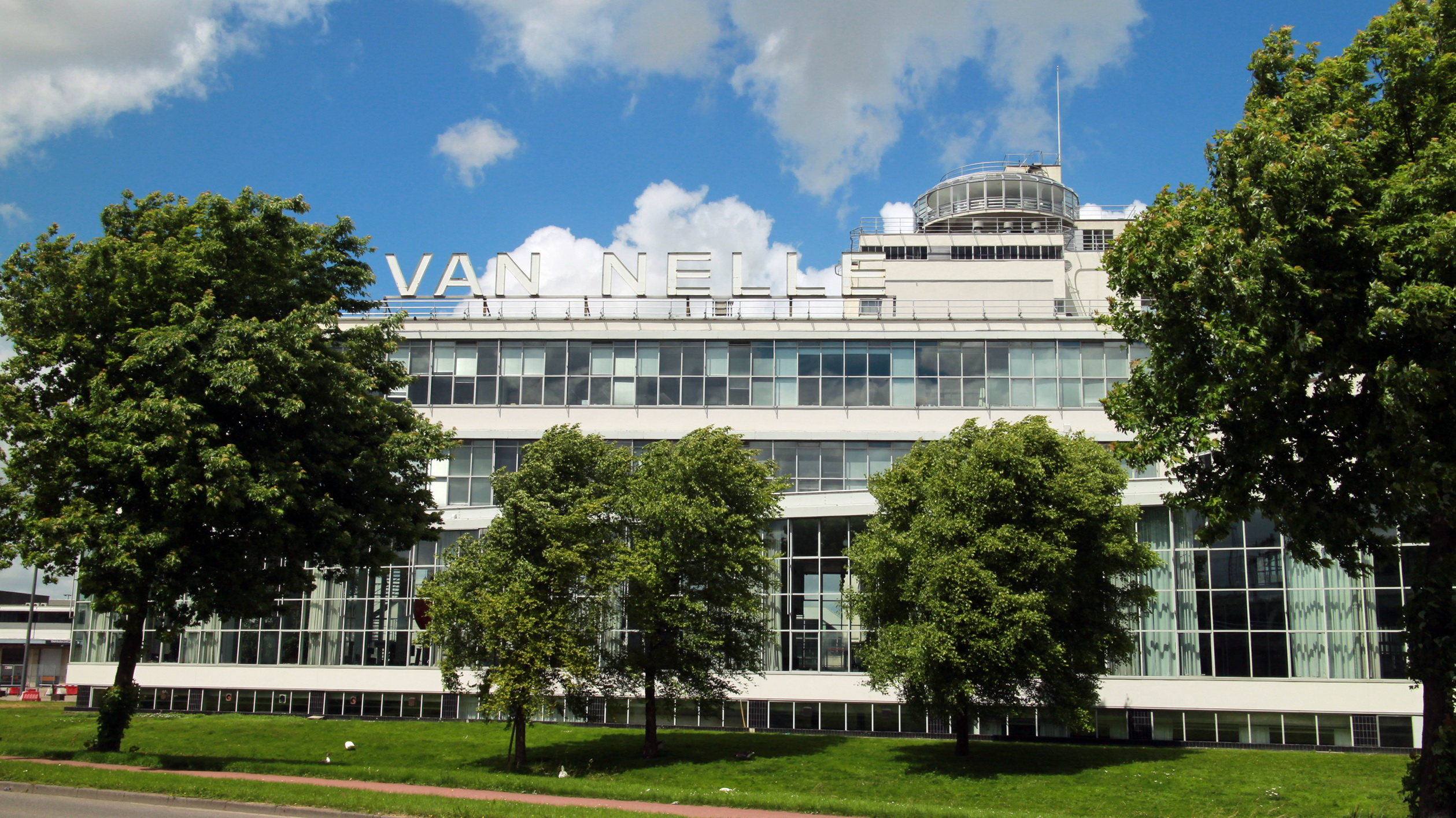
The side façade

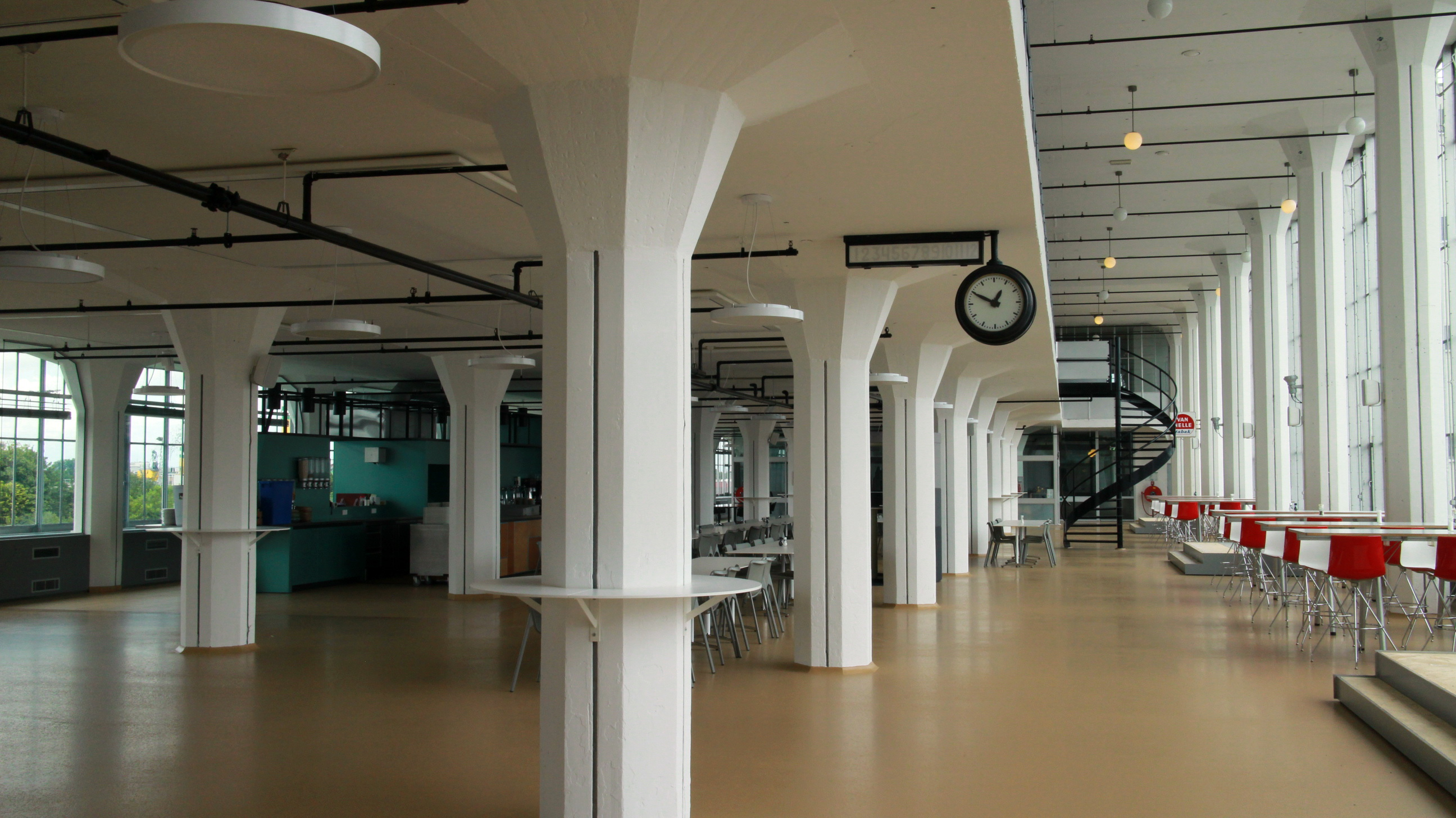
Interior

== National monument ==
The Van Nelle Factory is a Dutch national monument (Rijksmonument) and since 2014 has the status of UNESCO World Heritage Site. The Justification of Outstanding Universal Value was presented in 2013 to the UNESCO World Heritage Committee.
