= Weissenhof Estate =

Maisons de la Weissenhof-Siedlung
UNESCO World Heritage Site
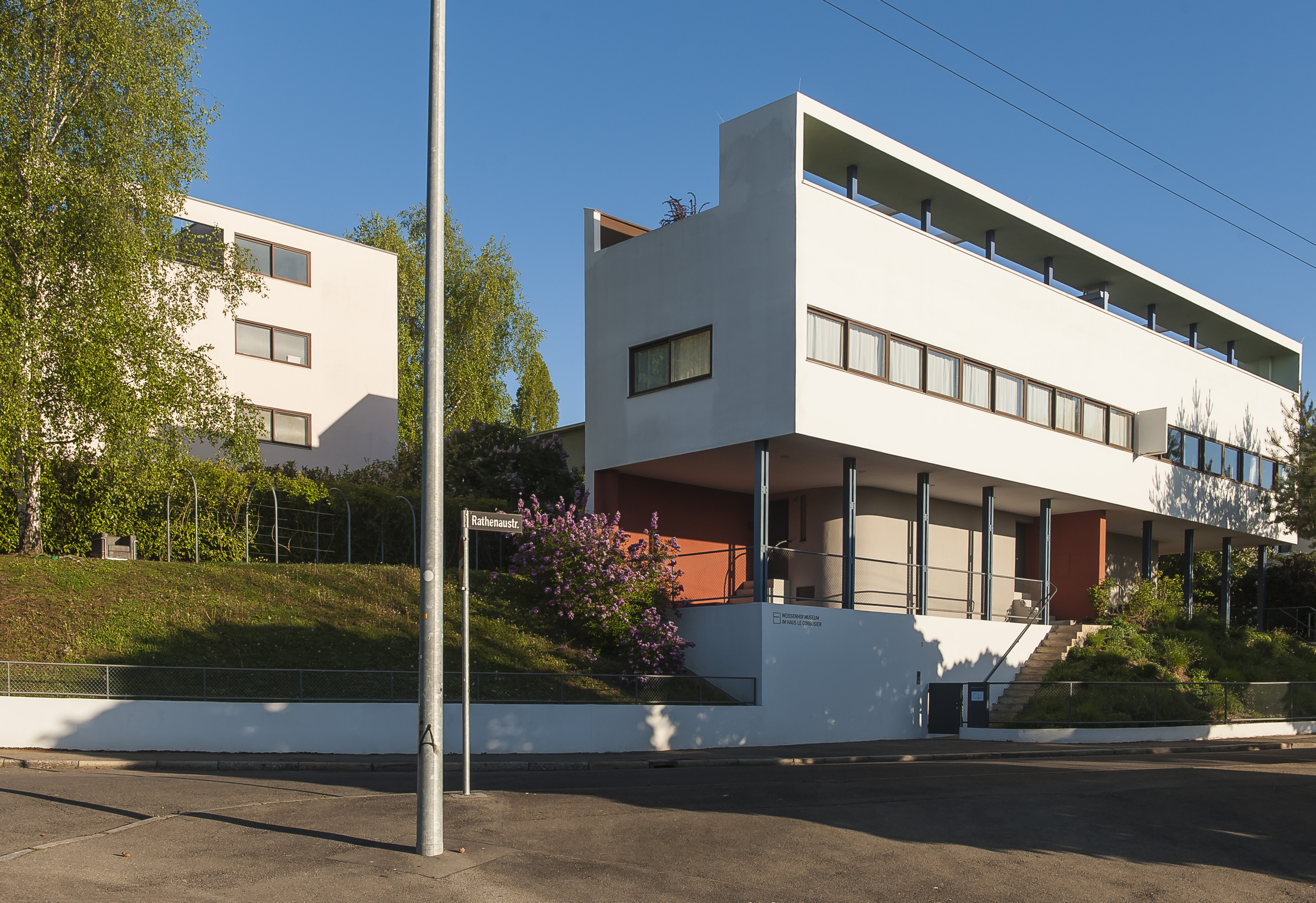
- Homes 13 (left) and 14–15 (right)

- Location within Baden-Württemberg Location within Germany
- Location: Stuttgart, Baden-Württemberg, Germany
- Part of: The Architectural Work of Le Corbusier, an Outstanding Contribution to the Modern Movement
- Criteria: Cultural: (i)(ii)(vi)
- Reference: 1321rev-005
- Inscription: 2016 (40th Session)
- Area: 0.1165 ha (12,540 sq ft)
- Buffer zone: 33.6213 ha (3,618,970 sq ft)
- Website: weissenhofmuseum.de/en/
- Coordinates: 48°48.03′N 9°10.66′E

The Weissenhof Estate (German: Weißenhofsiedlung, pronounced [ˈvaɪsn̩hoːfˌziːdlʊŋ]) is a housing estate built for the 1927 Deutscher Werkbund exhibition in Stuttgart, Germany. It was an international showcase of modern architecture's aspiration to provide inexpensive, simple, efficient, and good-quality housing.

Two buildings designed by Le Corbusier were designated a World Heritage Site in 2016 as part of The Architectural Work of Le Corbusier, an Outstanding Contribution to the Modern Movement. The remainder of the estate, and some adjacent streets and buildings, are a part of the site's buffer zone.

== History and description ==
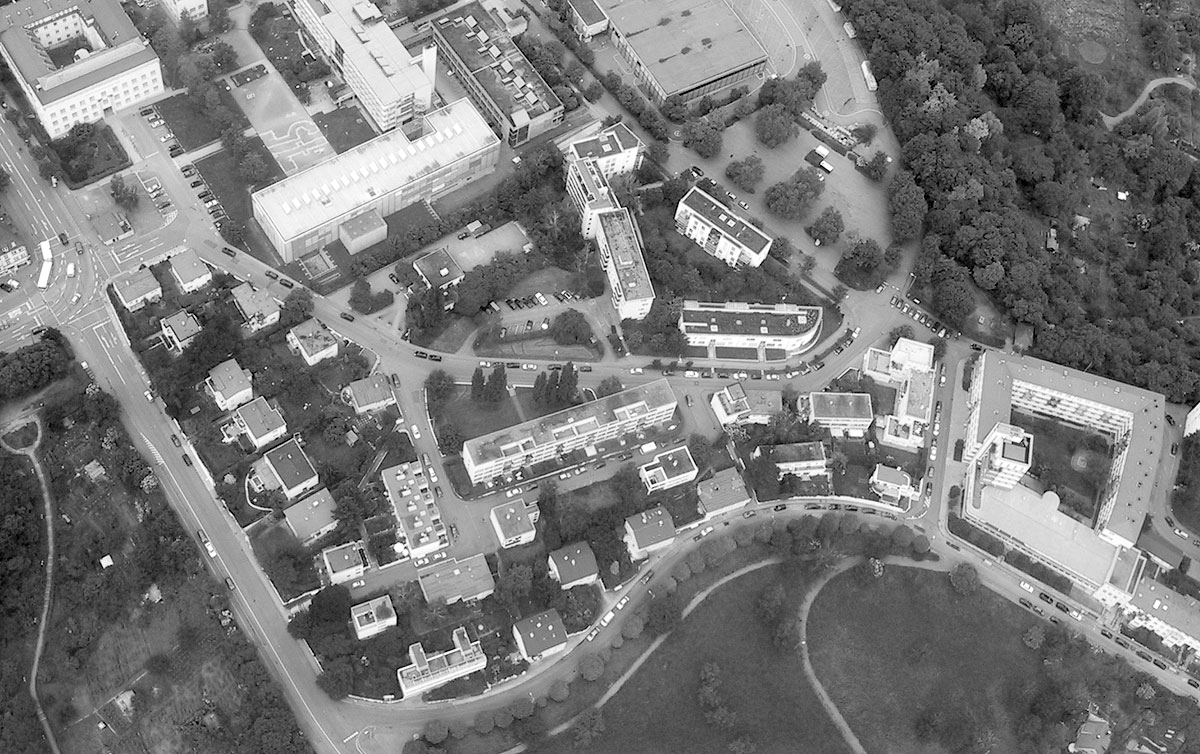
Aerial view of the Weissenhof Estate

The estate was built for the Deutscher Werkbund exhibition in 1927, and included twenty-one buildings comprising sixty dwellings, designed by seventeen European architects. The German architect Mies van der Rohe was in charge of the project on behalf of the city, and selected the architects, budgeted and coordinated their entries, prepared the site, and oversaw construction. Le Corbusier was awarded the two prime sites, facing the city, and by far the largest budget.

The twenty-one buildings consist of terraced and detached houses as well as apartment buildings. They vary slightly in form but display standardized design language. What they have in common are their simplified facades, flat roofs used as terraces, window bands, open plan interiors, and the high level of prefabrication which permitted their erection in just five months. Despite popular belief, only about one third of the buildings were completely white. Bruno Taut had his entry, the smallest, painted in various colors. Le Corbusier and Pierre Jeanneret's entry was white, blue, orange, and green. Van der Rohe's was painted a light pink. The eaves of Hans Scharoun's entry were painted orange.

Advertised as a prototype of future workers' housing, in fact each of these houses was customized and furnished on a budget far out of a normal worker's reach and with little direct relevance to the technical challenges of standardized mass construction. The exhibition opened to the public on 23 July 1927, a year late, and drew large crowds.

The houses showcased in the exhibition were of such avant-garde expression, homes 14-15 served as a backdrop for an image showcasing the newest Mercedes-Benz at the time, an 8/38 PS Roadster.

== Homes ==
Map

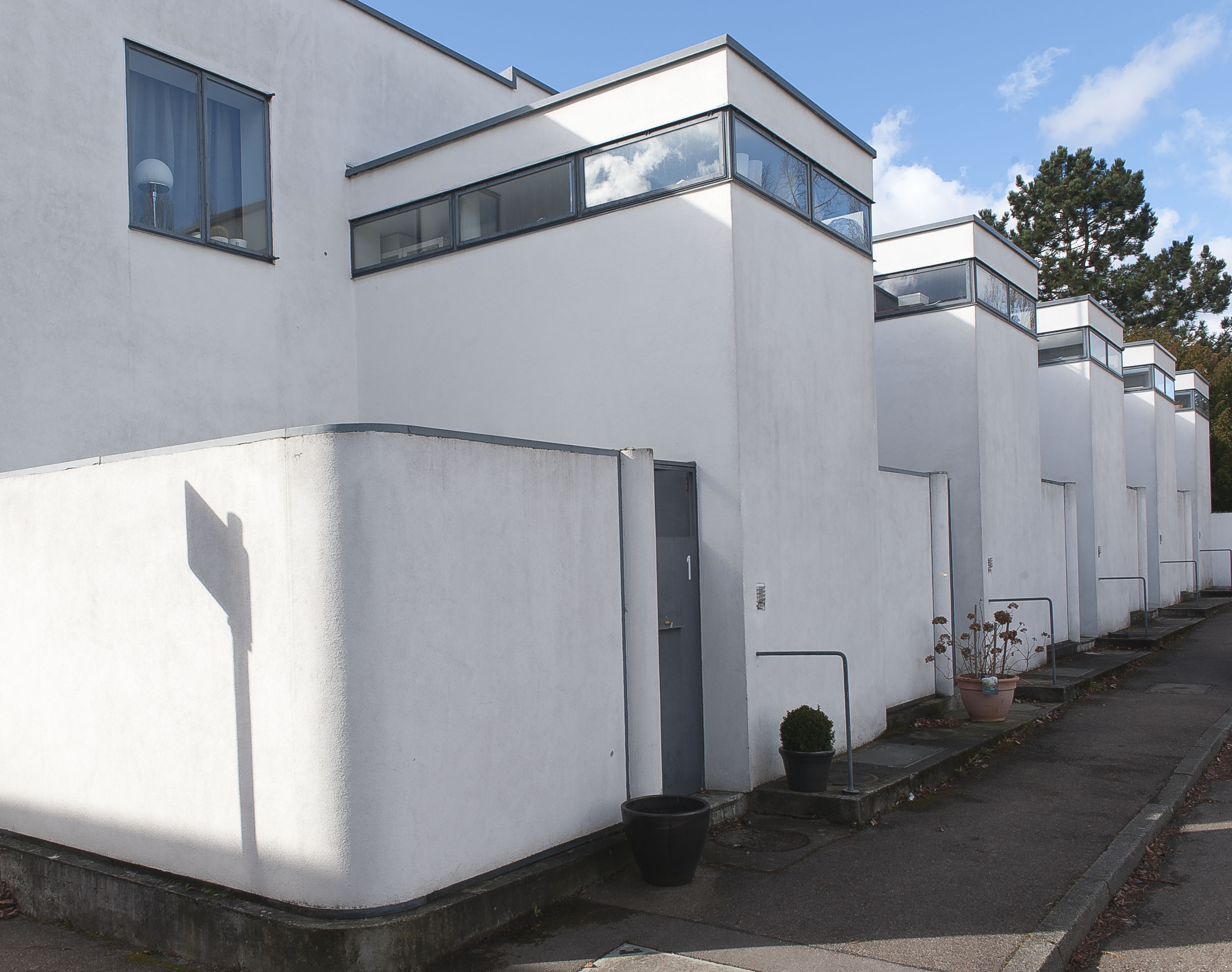
Homes 5-9: Terraced houses by J.J.P. Oud

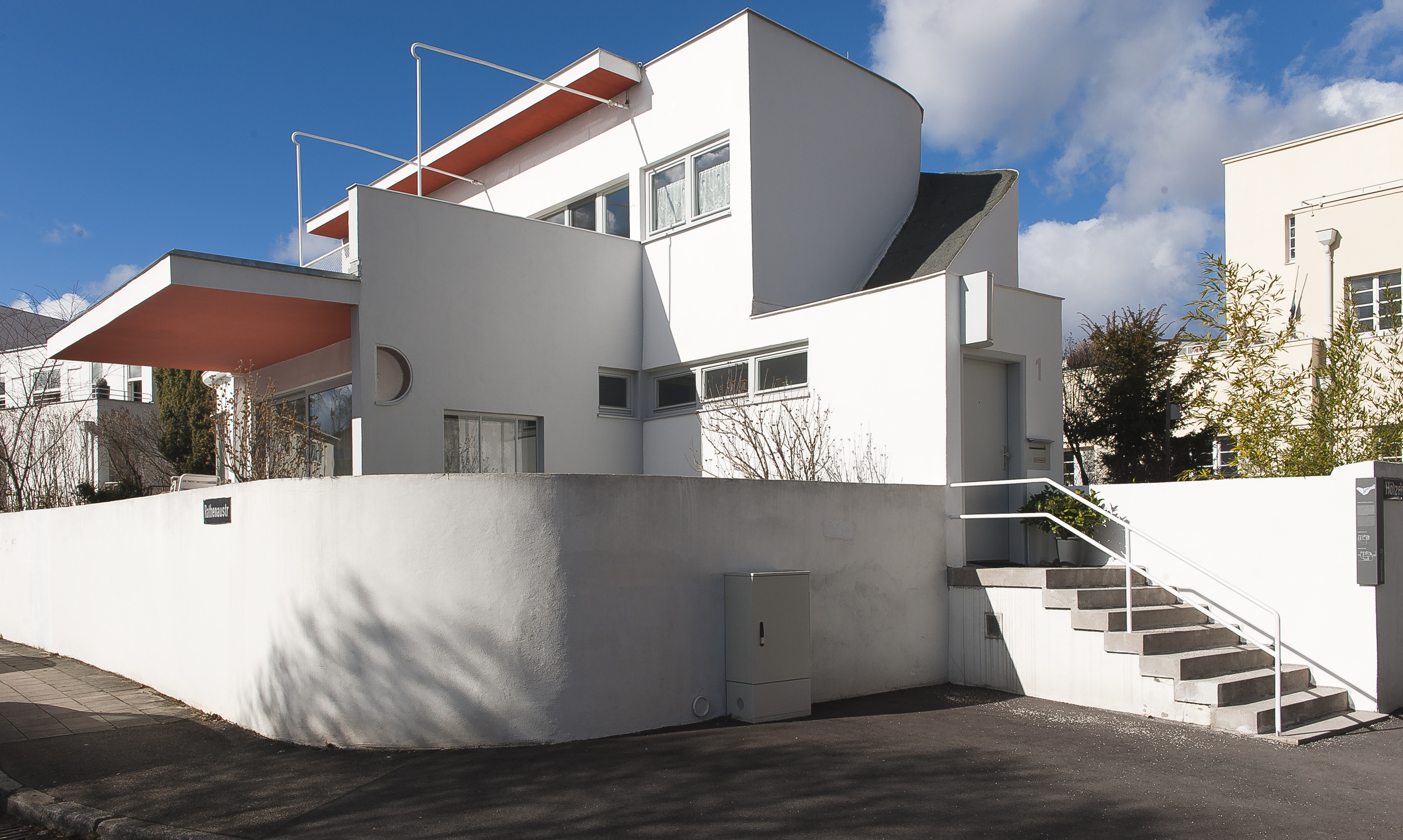
Home 33: The Scharoun residence

Of the original twenty-one buildings, eleven survive as of 2006. Bombing damage during World War II is responsible for the complete loss of the homes by Gropius, Hilberseimer, Bruno Taut, Poelzig, Max Taut (home 24), and Döcker. Another of Max Taut's homes (23) was demolished in the 1950s, as was Rading's.

=== List of homes ===
- 1-4: Ludwig Mies van der Rohe
- 5-9: J.J.P. Oud
- 10: Victor Bourgeois
  - Originally, the lot was to be built on by Adolf Loos, but he was scrapped from the list after run-ins with and criticism of the Werkbund. Instead, Bourgeois built a home that was more traditional than the planned design by Loos, which was to have an innovative relation between up and down. One unique feature is a wine cellar from gravel rather than concrete. The two-story family home was damaged during the war, and was turned into a two-family dwelling afterward.
- 11 and 12: Adolf Gustav Schneck
- 13-15: Le Corbusier and Pierre Jeanneret
- 16 and 17: Walter Gropius
- 18: Ludwig Hilberseimer
  - Designed for a family of six, painted in light gray. For reasons of economy, Hilberseimer's planned sliding windows were replaced with cheaper, conventional ones—when Hilberseimer visited the finished house, he did not recognize it. The building was destroyed in the war; a conventional home now occupies the plot.
- 19: Bruno Taut
  - Taut was part of the group on the recommendation of his older brother, Max Taut. House 19 is a single-family, two-story home with a basement, designed as a "proletarian's home." His house was painted red, blue, and yellow, and was destroyed in the war.
- 20: Hans Poelzig
  - Poelzig's contribution is a single-family, two-story home with a winter garden and a sun terrace as prominent features. It was destroyed in the war.
- 21 and 22: Richard Döcker
  - Döcker was assigned two lots in van der Rohe's plan, between Rathenaustraße and Bruckmannweg. He originally designed two connected homes, based on his belief in connections between buildings and spaces, but changed the plans after seeing that none of the other buildings on the estate were connected. Both were single-family homes, no. 22 with one and a half stories, including a garage (the only home on the estate with one). Döcker wanted brightly colored homes; what color they were painted can no longer be determined since both were destroyed completely in the war.
- 23 and 24: Max Taut
- 25: Adolf Rading
- 26 and 27: Josef Frank
- 28-30: Mart Stam
- 31 and 32: Peter Behrens
- 33: Hans Scharoun
  - A much more curved design than the other (angular) buildings, Scharoun's is a single-family home with two stories and a basement.

== See also ==
- New Frankfurt, Frankfurt 1925-32
- Berlin Modernism Housing Estates, Berlin 1926
- Bauhaus and its Sites in Weimar, Dessau and Bernau, 1923-1930
- Le Corbusier's Five Points of Architecture
