= Leendert van der Vlugt =

Dutch architect

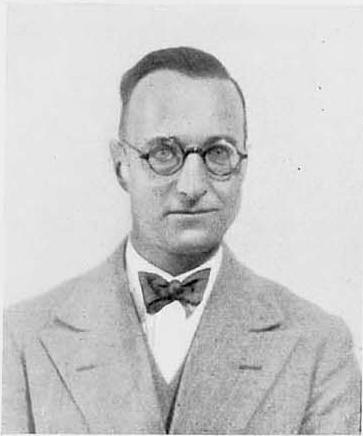
- Born: Leendert Cornelis van der Vlugt; 13 April 1894; The Netherlands
- Died: 25 April 1936 (aged 42)
- Occupation: Architect
- Buildings: Bergpolderflat; Feijenoord Stadium
- Projects: Van Nelle Factory
- Design: Weissenhof Estate

Leendert Cornelis van der Vlugt (Dutch pronunciation: [ˈleːndərt kɔrˈneːlɪs fɑn dər ˈvlʏxt]; 13 April 1894 – 25 April 1936) was a Dutch architect in Rotterdam. In the architects office Brinkman & Van der Vlugt he was responsible for the architecture of the Van Nelle Factory, a listed monument of the UNESCO World Heritage Site since 2014.

After the death of the Rotterdam architect Michiel Brinkman in 1925, his son Johannes Brinkman, a constructional engineer, took over the architectural office and made Leendert van der Vlugt co-director. The new practice was called J.A. Brinkman & L.C. van der Vlugt.

== Architect responsible for the Van Nelle Factory ==
The activities of the Brinkman & Van der Vlugt office lasted only about ten years because Leendert van der Vlugt has died in 1936 (Hodgkin's disease). Shortly after the death of Jan Duiker in 1935, the Netherlands lost with Leendert van der Vlugt a second young architectural talent. Both architects had created buildings of international rank: the Van Nelle Factory in Rotterdam by Leendert van der Vlugt and the Zonnestraal Sanatorium in Hilversum by Jan Duiker.

Since the death of Leendert van der Vlugt, there has been a misleading attribution of his work. In all books of architectural history, credit for the design of his buildings has gone to J.A. Brinkman & L.C. van der Vlugt, (sometimes together with Mart Stam). Attributions of this kind suggest that J.A. Brinkman was the creative mind in the practice. Jacob Bakema has dealt with this question in his small book "L.C. van der Vlugt". The fact that Leendert van der Vlugt was the creative architect and not Johannes Brinkman is indicated by the following quotations from Bakema's booklet:

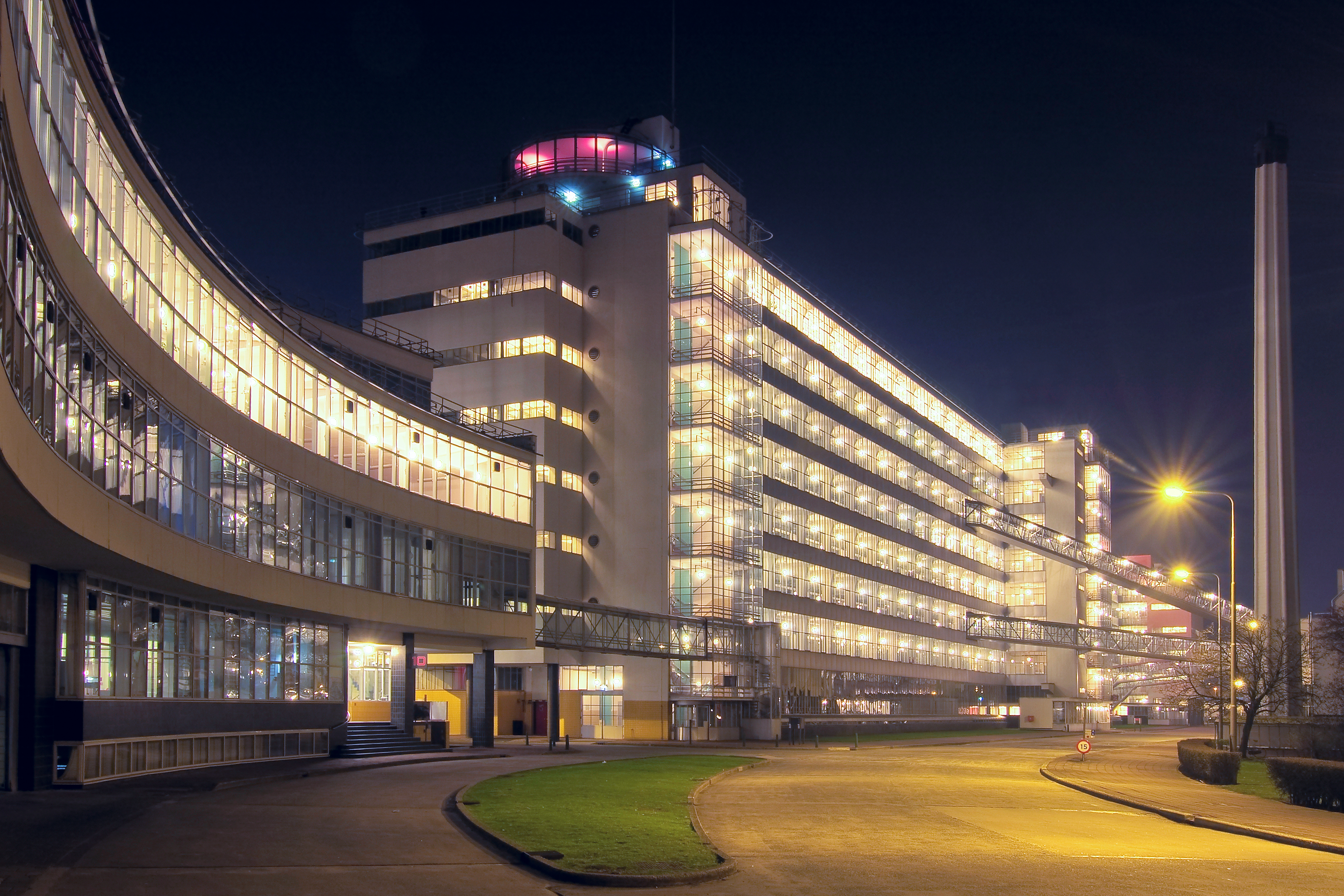
Van Nelle Factory in Rotterdam by Leendert van der Vlugt (and Mart Stam), 1927-30

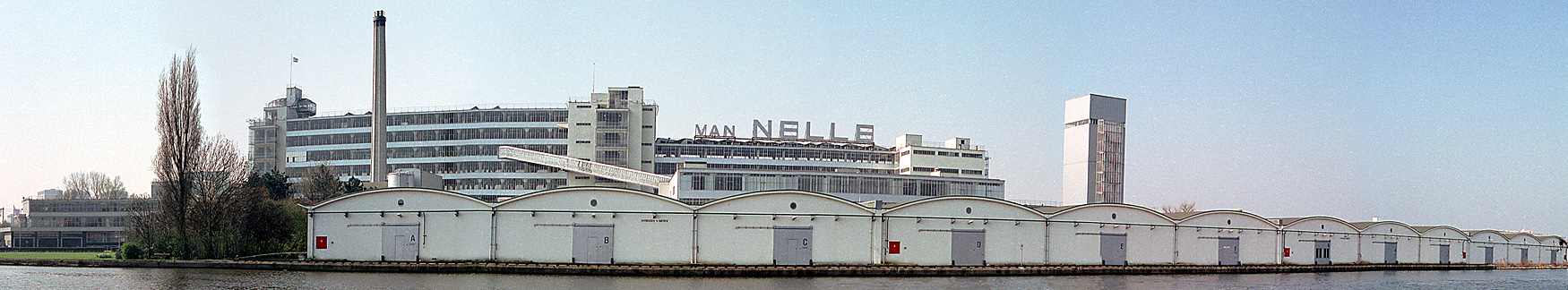

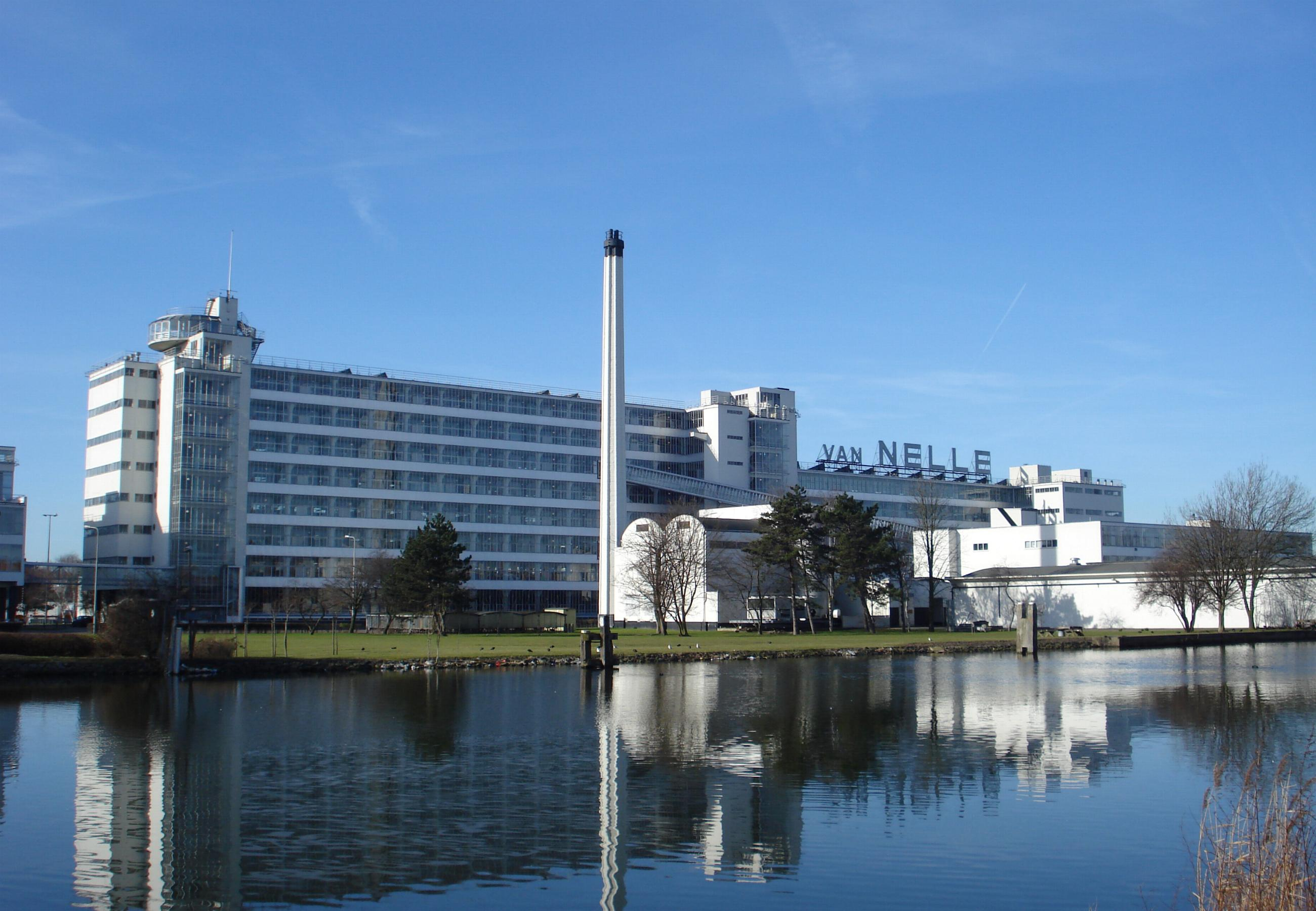

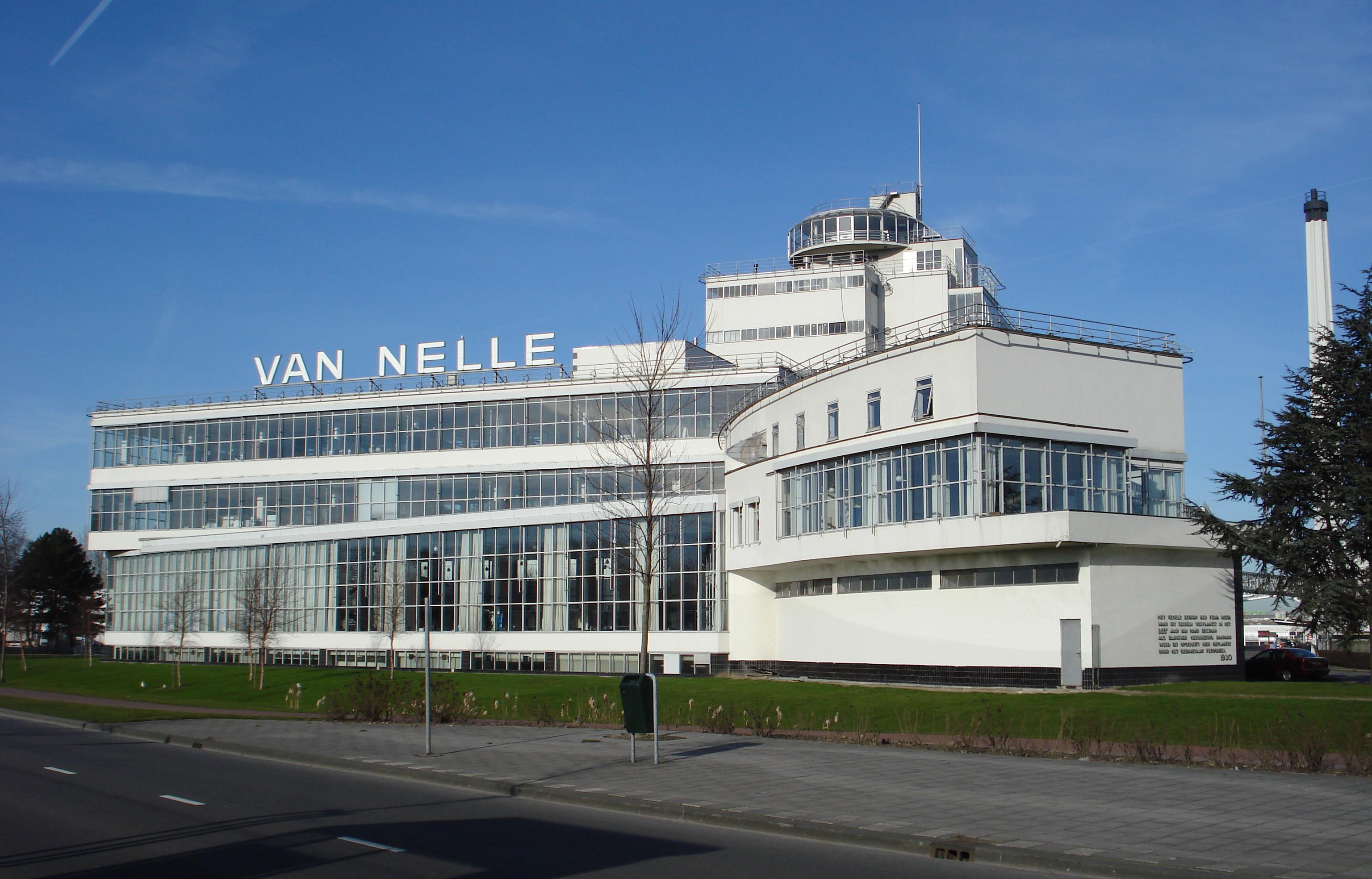

- Former Van Nelle director C.H. van der Leeuw: "Brinkman Jr. (Johannes Brinkman) played no part whatsoever in the design and construction of the Van Nelle Factory..." (p. 12). It is worth mentioning that Johannes Brinkman (b. 1902) finished his study at the Delft University of Technology in 1931, not as an architect, but as a civil engineer. He probably had less creative ability than his father Michiel Brinkman.
- Mart Stam: "I worked in the Brinkman & Van der Vlugt office as design draughtsman... I didn't much care for the curved building of the office section, but Van der Vlugt was in charge of the project... He gave the instructions..." (p. 16).
- Le Corbusier, 30 May 1936: "With the death of Van der Vlugt, modern architecture loses one of its best representatives. I am familiar with Van der Vlugt's outstanding achievement, the Van Nelle Factory in Rotterdam... A few years ago, I visited the Factory together with Mr van der Leeuw, the director. Later, I met Van der Vlugt at a luncheon... How many works are there in the modern world that can rival the Van Nelle Factory?... The fact that we shall not see him (Van der Vlugt) any more and shall no longer witness the development of his outstanding talent is extremely regrettable..." (p. 17).

To eliminate any misunderstandings about who was responsible for the design work, Leendert van der Vlugt's name should be placed first. The attribution of responsibility for the design of the Van Nelle Factory, for example, could be formulated as follows:

Leendert van der Vlugt (and Mart Stam) of Brinkman & Van der Vlugt Architects; or

Leendert van der Vlugt (Brinkman & Van der Vlugt)

== Constructivism ==
The influence of Constructivism is evident in the Van Nelle Factory. From 1926 to 1928, Mart Stam was an assistant in the office and was partly involved in the design of this project. Through his communicative skills and many connections, Mart Stam had made contact with the Russian avant-garde in Berlin in 1922. In 1926, during his first year of work for the Brinkman & Van der Vlugt office, he organized an architectural trip to the Netherlands for the Russian artist El Lissitzky and his wife Sophie Küppers, a collector of contemporary art. They visited the architects Jacobus Oud, Gerrit Rietveld, Cornelis van Eesteren and others. According to Sophie Küppers, Mart Stam told them about "his" factory in the course of the excursion. The aspect of Constructivism may possibly have come from Mart Stam. On the other hand, the fascinating rounded architectural forms (in the office tract and the roof structure) are attributable to Leendert van der Vlugt.

== Complications Authorship ==
The years 1926-28 were full of hectic activity for Mart Stam (b. 1899). In addition to his work for Leendert van der Vlugt, he was occupied with the houses for the Weissenhof Estate in Stuttgart, with a competition for a water tower and with the first steel cantilever chair, not to mention his contacts with his Russian friends and his participation at the first CIAM Congress. In retrospect, one can say that the works dating from this period are among Mart Stam's best. The question arises, whether Leendert van der Vlugt, the more experienced of the two architects, had any hand in the design of the houses in Stuttgart. The great elegance one finds in them is also evident in buildings by Leendert van der Vlugt, but not in the later works of Mart Stam. The question is justified, for in his history of architecture, Kenneth Frampton raised it in a reversed form. A lot of architects and historians have perhaps allowed themselves to be impressed too much by Mart Stam's brilliant perspective drawings. Another question would be why the well-known Dutch Forum Group did not undertake a reappraisal of Leendert van der Vlugt similar to that accorded to Jan Duiker. One explanation might be that the Forum editor, Jacob Bakema, the youngest member of an architectural practice with a long tradition and ongoing development (Michiel Brinkman / Johannes Brinkman / Leendert van der Vlugt / Johannes van den Broek / Jacob Bakema), was not really interested in a reassessment of Leendert van der Vlugt.

== Reinstatement of Leendert van der Vlugt ==
The architectural database archINFORM contains a short biography of Johannes Brinkman, which begins as follows: "Johannes Andreas Brinkman: Dutch architect, who rose to fame with the erection of the Van Nelle tobacco factory in Rotterdam, designed in collaboration with Mart Stam and one of the outstanding industrial buildings of the 20th century..." This is a commonly held view that can be found even on the internet site "Great Buildings Online". It would be a welcome addition for the history of architecture, if the Dutch Architectural Institute NAi in Rotterdam made an official declaration concerning the correct design attribution of the Van Nelle Factory. A further step would be a re-evaluation of Leendert van der Vlugt, which might also lead to an adequate monograph on that architect.

According to Graham Livesey, "the figure of L.C. van der Vlugt remains one of the most overlooked figures of 1920s European architecture."

== Buildings (selection) ==
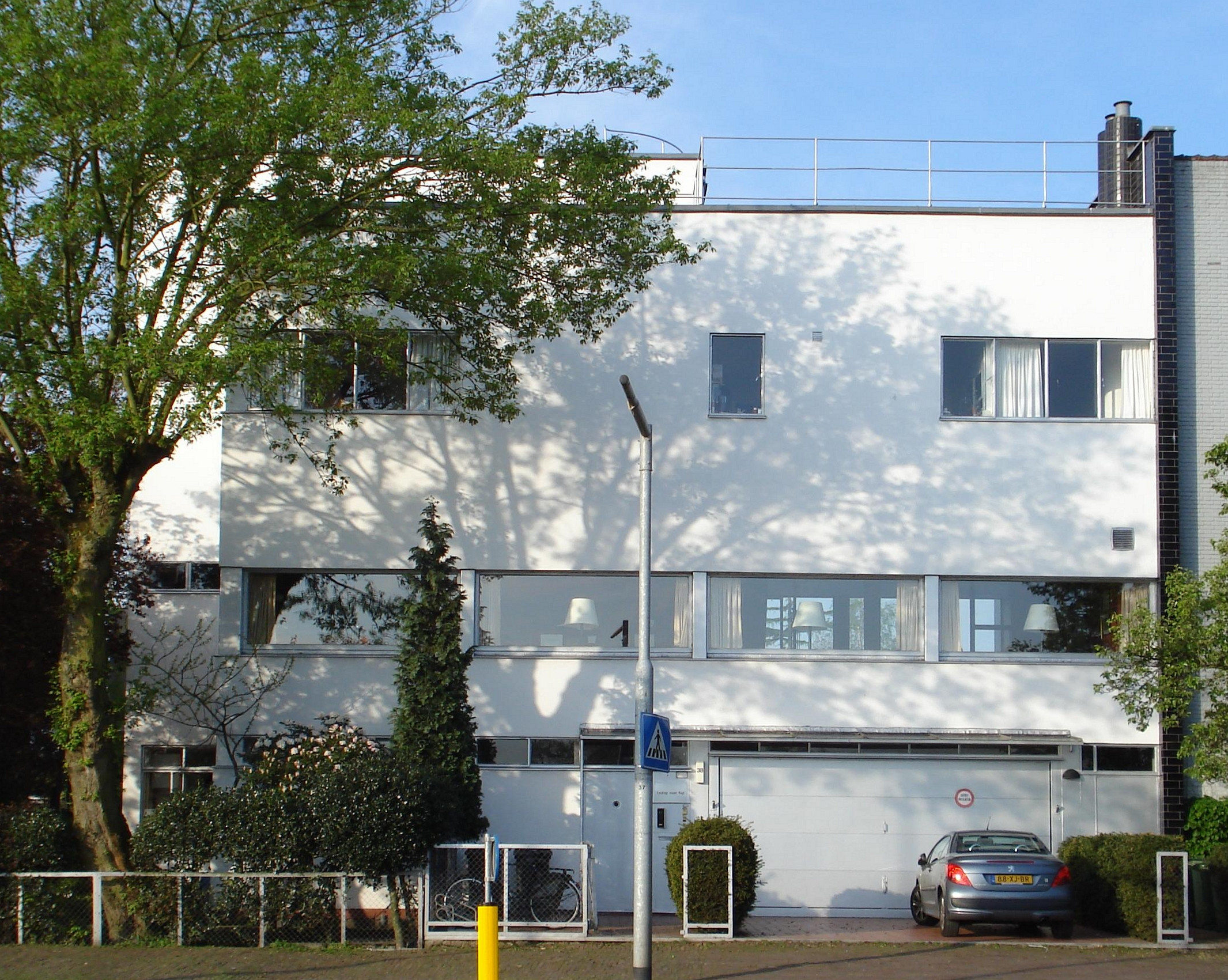
House C.H. van der Leeuw (director of the Van Nelle Factory) in Rotterdam by Leendert van der Vlugt, 1928-29

- School for Trade and Industry (nowadays Wiebengacomplex) in Groningen, 1922
- Linea Recta House in Zuidhorn (Groningen), 1924
- Buildings of the Theosophical Association in Amsterdam, 1925–26
- Van Nelle Factory in Rotterdam, 1927-30 (with Mart Stam / structural engineer: Jan Wiebenga)
- Van der Leeuw House in Rotterdam, 1928–29
- National Telephone Box, 1931
- Boevé House in Rotterdam, 1932–34
- Sonneveld House in Rotterdam, 1933–34
- Bergpolderflat in Rotterdam, 1933-35 (in collaboration with Willem van Tijen)
- Feijenoord Stadium in Rotterdam, 1935–36

Leendert van der Vlugt was responsible for the design of all these schemes. The Bergpolder Apartment Building achieved international recognition thanks to Van der Vlugt's personal style. From 1925 onwards, design responsibility can best be formulated as: Leendert van der Vlugt (Brinkman & Van der Vlugt).

== Bibliography ==
- J.B. Bakema, "L.C. van der Vlugt", Amsterdam 1968, (English edition).
- Sophie Lissitzky-Küppers, "El Lissitzky", Dresden 1976.
- Herman Hertzberger, "Lessons for Students in Architecture", Rotterdam 1991.
- Graham Livesey, "The Van der Leeuw House: Theosophical Connections with Early Modern Architecture", Calgary 1998.
- Anne Backer (ed.), "Van Nelle - Monument in Progress", Rotterdam 2005.
