= International Style =

Modernist architectural style

International Style architecture
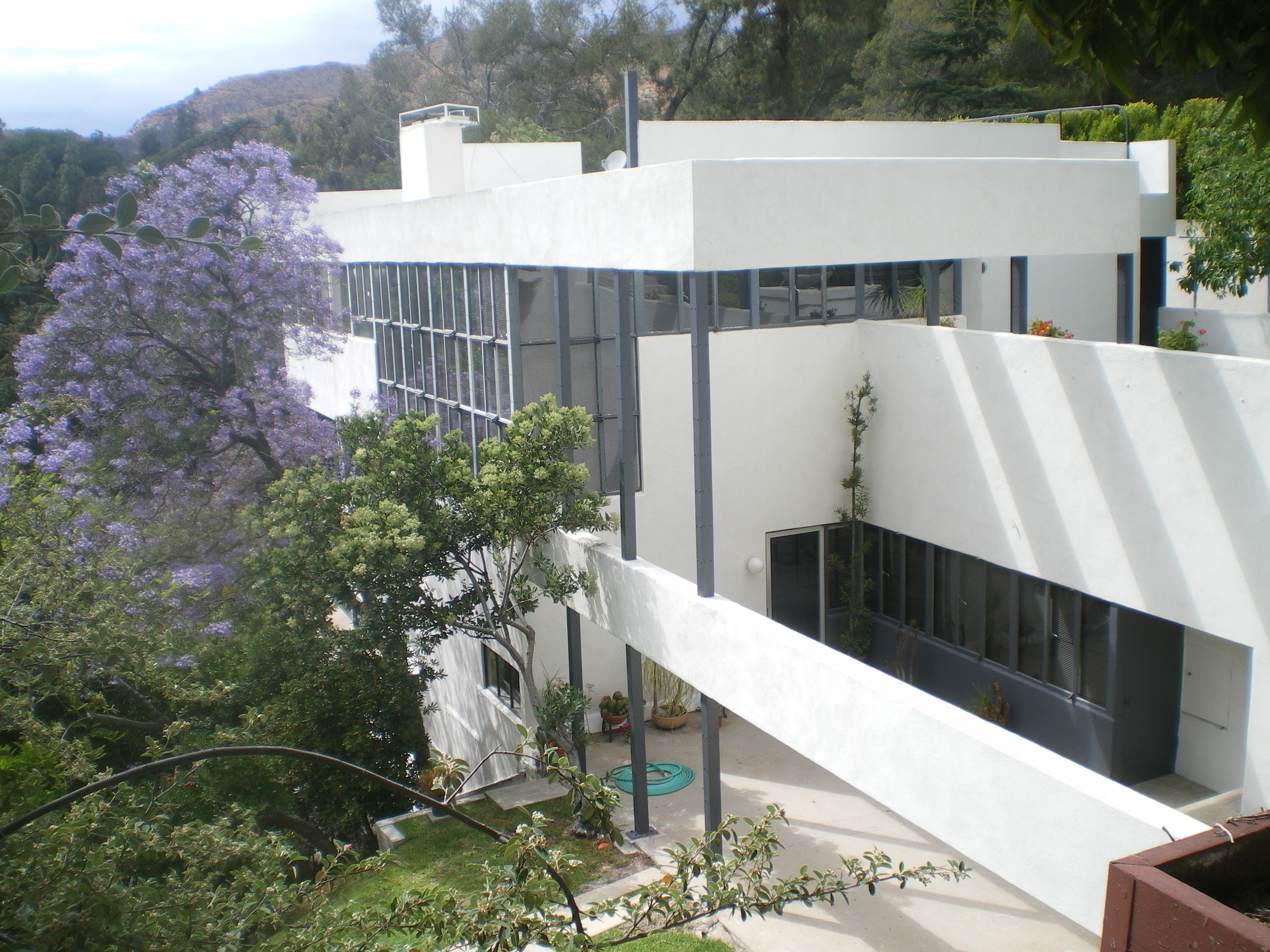
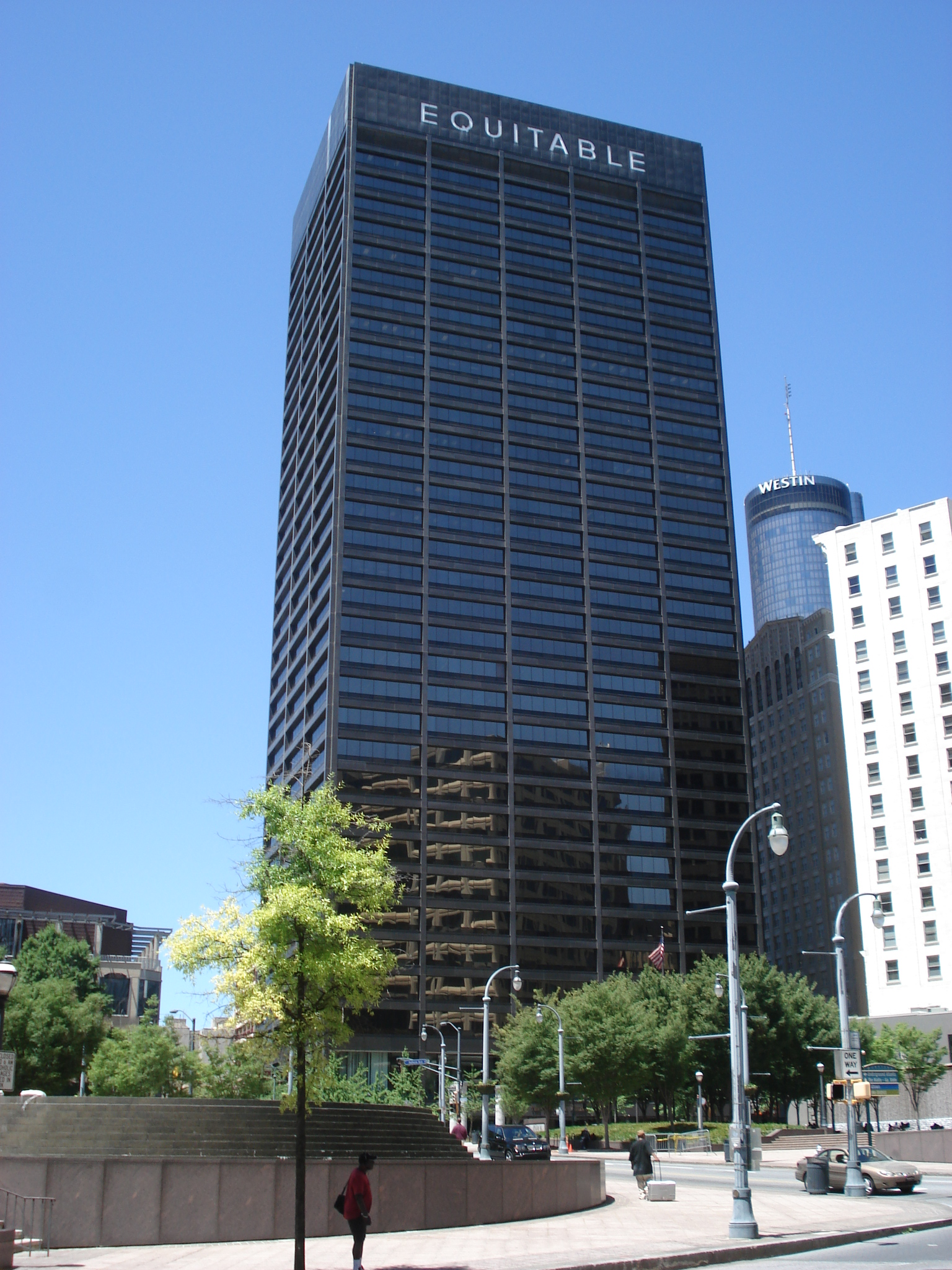
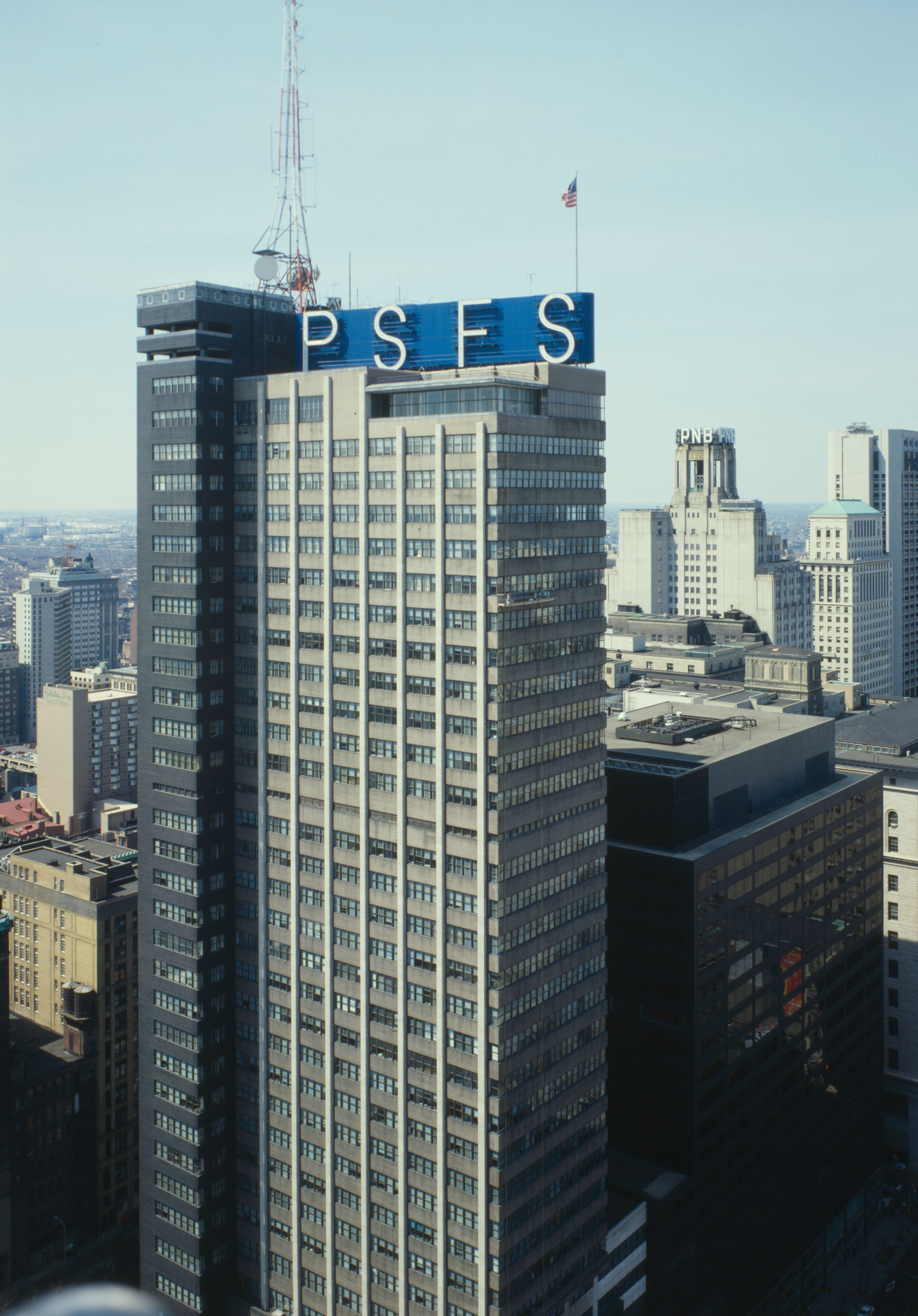
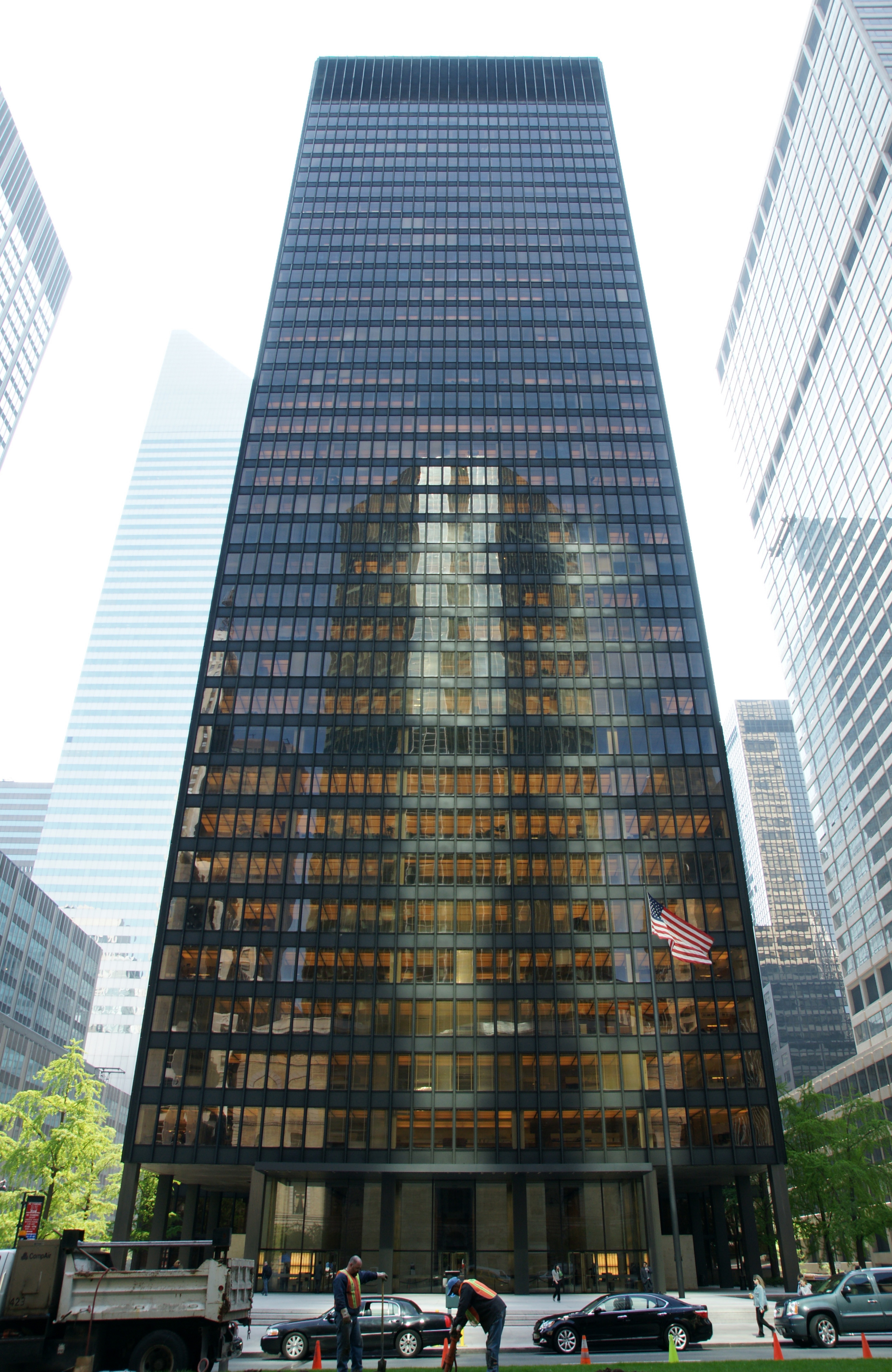
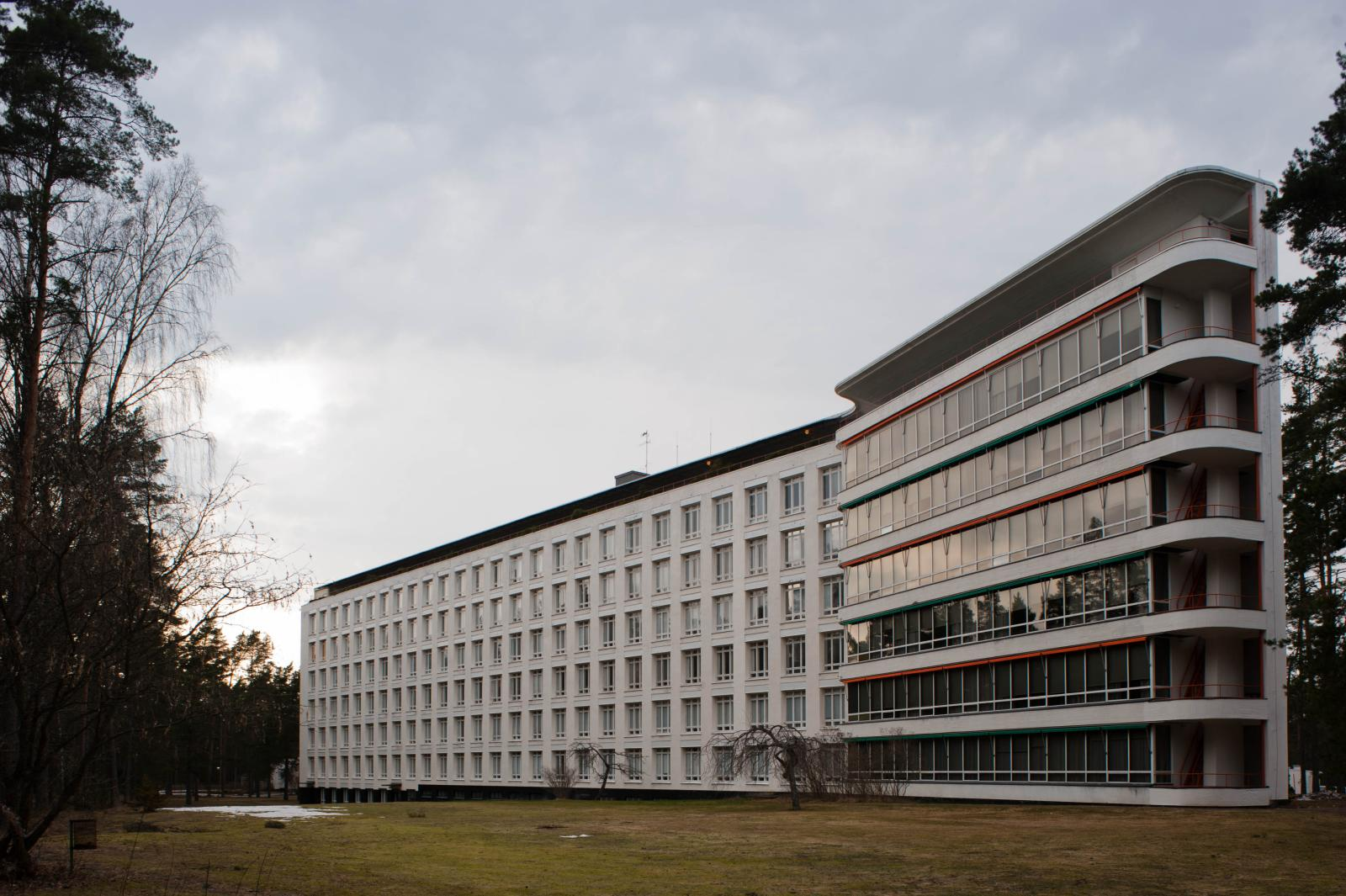
- Lovell House in Los Angeles (1927–29), by Richard Neutra Villa Savoye in Paris (1928–31), by Le Corbusier Equitable Building in Atlanta (1966–68), by Skidmore, Owings & Merrill PSFS Building in Philadelphia (completed 1932), by George Howe and William Lescaze Seagram Building in New York City (1955–58), by Mies van der Rohe Paimio Sanatorium in Finland, (1929–1930) by Alvar Aalto Istiqlal Mosque in Jakarta (1961–1978), by Friedrich Silaban

Additional media
- Years active: 1920s–1970s
- Location: Worldwide
- Major figures: Ludwig Mies van der Rohe, Jacobus Oud, Le Corbusier, Richard Neutra and Philip Johnson.

The International Style is a major architectural style and movement that began in western Europe in the 1920s and dominated modern architecture until the 1970s. It is defined by strict adherence to functional and utilitarian designs and construction methods, typically expressed through minimalism. The style is characterized by modular and rectilinear forms, flat surfaces devoid of ornamentation and decoration, open and airy interiors that blend with the exterior, and the use of glass, steel, and concrete.

The International Style is sometimes called rationalist architecture and the modern movement, although the former is mostly used in English to refer specifically to either Italian rationalism or the style that developed in 1920s Europe more broadly. In continental Europe, this and related styles are variably called Functionalism, Neue Sachlichkeit ("New Objectivity"), De Stijl ("The Style"), and Rationalism, all of which are contemporaneous movements and styles that share similar principles, origins, and proponents.

Rooted in the modernism movement, the International Style is closely related to modern architecture and likewise reflects several intersecting developments in culture, politics, and technology in the early 20th century. After being brought to the United States by European architects in the 1930s, it quickly became an "unofficial" North American style, particularly after World War II. The International Style reached its height in the 1950s and 1960s, when it was widely adopted worldwide for its practicality and as a symbol of industry, progress, and modernity. The style remained the prevailing design philosophy for urban development and reconstruction into the 1970s, especially in the Western world.

The International Style was one of the first architectural movements to receive critical renown and global popularity. Regarded as the high point of modernist architecture, it is sometimes described as the "architecture of the modern movement" and credited with "single-handedly transforming the skylines of every major city in the world with its simple cubic forms". These qualities provoked negative reactions against the style as monotonous, austere, and incongruent with existing landscapes. This critique was conveyed through various movements such as postmodernism, new classical architecture, and deconstructivism.

== Concept and definition ==
The term "International Style" was first used in 1932 by the historian Henry-Russell Hitchcock and architect Philip Johnson to describe a movement among European architects in the 1920s that was distinguished by three key design principles: (1) "Architecture as volume – thin planes or surfaces create the building's form, as opposed to a solid mass"; (2) "Regularity in the facade, as opposed to building symmetry"; and (3) "No applied ornament".

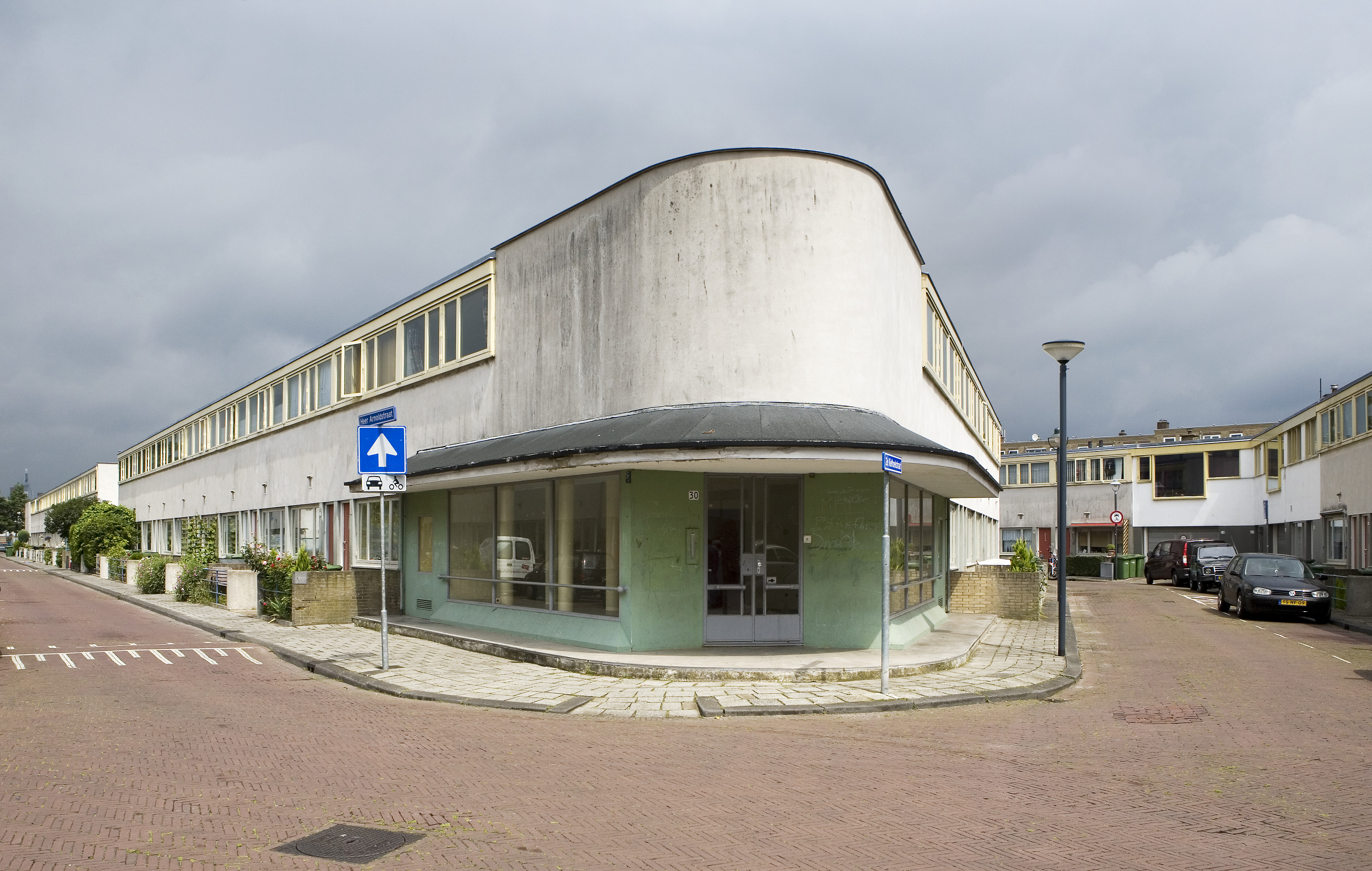
Kiefhoek Worker's Housing project, now a museum, Rotterdam, by Jacobus Oud (1930)

International style is an ambiguous term; the unity and integrity of this direction is deceptive. Its formal features were revealed differently in different countries. Despite the unconditional commonality, the International Style has never been a single phenomenon. However, International Style architecture demonstrates a unity of approach and general principles: lightweight structures, skeletal frames, new materials, a modular system, an open plan, and the use of simple geometric shapes.

The problem of the International Style is that it is not obvious what type of material the term should be applied to: at the same time, there are key monuments of the 20th century (Le Corbusier's Villa Savoye; Wright's Fallingwater House) and mass-produced architectural products of their time. Here it is appropriate to talk about the use of recognizable formal techniques and the creation of a standard architectural product, rather than iconic objects.

Cover of The International Style (1932, reprinted 1996) by Henry-Russell Hitchcock and Philip Johnson

Hitchcock and Johnson's 1932 MoMA exhibition catalog identified the principles of the style. Common characteristics of the International Style include: a radical simplification of form, a rejection of superfluous ornamentation, bold repetition and embracement of sleek glass, steel and efficient concrete as preferred materials. Accents were found to be suitably derived from natural design irregularities, such as the position of doors and fire escapes, stair towers, ventilators and even electric signs.

Further, the transparency of buildings, the honest expression of structure, and acceptance of industrialized mass-production techniques contributed to the International Style's design philosophy. Finally, the machine aesthetic, and logical design decisions leading to support building function were used by the International Style architect to create buildings reaching beyond historicism. The ideals of the style are commonly summed up in three slogans: ornament is a crime, truth to materials, form follows function; and Le Corbusier's description: "A house is a machine to live in".

Phenomena similar in nature also existed in other artistic fields, for example in graphics, such as the International Typographic Style and Swiss Style.

The Getty Research Institute defines it as "the style of architecture that emerged in The Netherlands, France, and Germany after World War I and spread throughout the world, becoming the dominant architectural style until the 1970s. The style is characterized by an emphasis on volume over mass, the use of lightweight, mass-produced, industrial materials, rejection of all ornament and colour, repetitive modular forms, and the use of flat surfaces, typically alternating with areas of glass." Some researchers consider the International Style as one of the attempts to create an ideal and utilitarian form.

== Background ==
Around the start of the 20th century, a number of architects around the world began developing new architectural solutions to integrate traditional precedents with new social demands and technological possibilities. The work of Victor Horta and Henry van de Velde in Brussels, Antoni Gaudí in Barcelona, Otto Wagner in Vienna and Charles Rennie Mackintosh in Glasgow, among many others, can be seen as a common struggle between old and new. These architects were not considered part of the International Style because they practiced in an "individualistic manner" and seen as the last representatives of Romanticism.

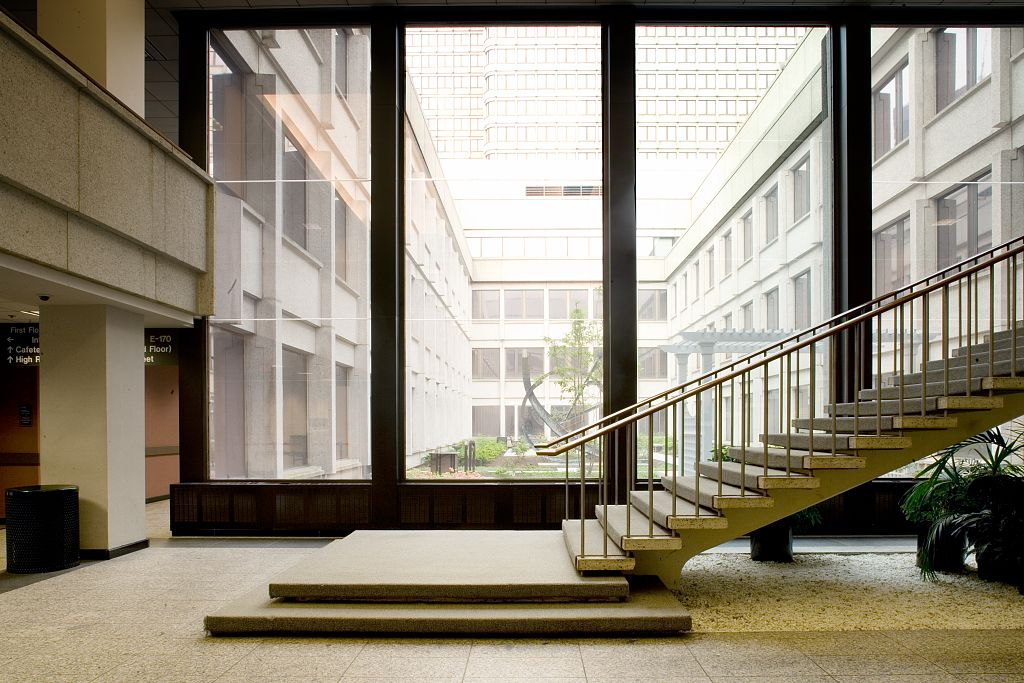
The John F. Kennedy Federal Building designed by Walter Gropius

The International Style can be traced to buildings designed by a small group of modernists, the major figures of which include Ludwig Mies van der Rohe, Jacobus Oud, Le Corbusier, Richard Neutra and Philip Johnson. The International Style of modern architecture emerged principally in Germany and France. This unadorned architecture was constructed with steel, reinforced concrete, and glass. The founder of the Bauhaus school, Walter Gropius, along with prominent Bauhaus instructor, Ludwig Mies van der Rohe, became known for steel frame structures employing glass curtain walls. One of the world's earliest modern buildings where this can be seen is a shoe factory designed by Gropius in 1911 in Alfeld, Germany, called the Fagus Works building. The first building built entirely on Bauhaus design principles was the concrete and steel Haus am Horn, built in 1923 in Weimar, Germany, designed by Georg Muche. The Gropius-designed Bauhaus school building in Dessau constructed 1925–1926, and the Harvard Graduate Center constructed 1949–1950, exhibit clean lines and a "concern for uncluttered interior spaces". Marcel Breuer, who after leaving the Bauhaus would later teach alongside Gropius at Harvard, is also an important contributor to the International Style.

Prior to use of the term 'International Style', some American architects, such as Louis Sullivan, Frank Lloyd Wright, and Irving Gill, exemplified qualities of simplification, honesty and clarity. Wright's Wasmuth Portfolio had been exhibited in Europe and influenced the work of European modernists, and his travels there probably influenced his own work, although he refused to be categorized with them. His buildings of the 1920s and 1930s clearly showed a change in the style of the architect, but in a different direction than the International Style.

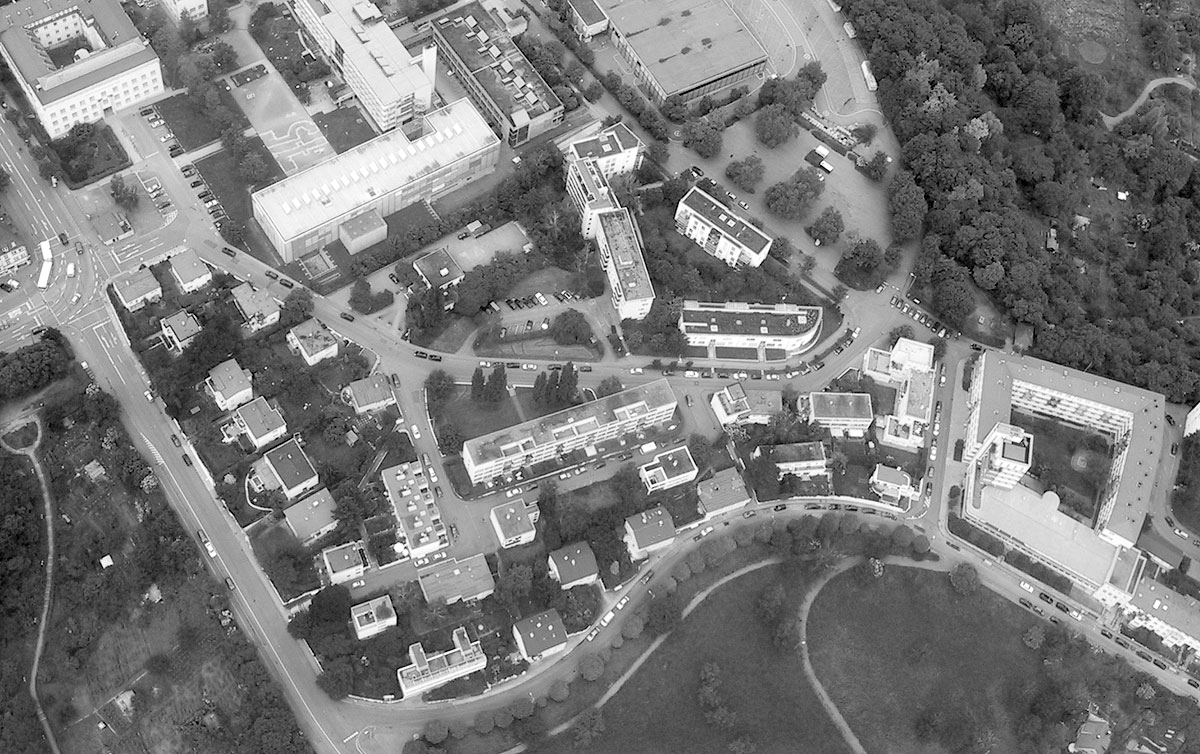
The Weissenhof Estate, Stuttgart, Germany (1927)

In Europe the modern movement in architecture had been called Functionalism or Neue Sachlichkeit (New Objectivity), L'Esprit Nouveau, or simply Modernism and was very much concerned with the coming together of a new architectural form and social reform, creating a more open and transparent society. The "International Style", as defined by Hitchcock and Johnson, was shaped by the activities of the Deutscher Werkbund. Le Corbusier had embraced Taylorist and Fordist strategies adopted from American industrial models in order to reorganize society. He contributed to a new journal called L'Esprit Nouveau that advocated the use of modern industrial techniques and strategies to create a higher standard of living on all socio-economic levels. In 1927, one of the first and most defining manifestations of the International Style was the Weissenhof Estate in Stuttgart, overseen by Mies van der Rohe. It was enormously popular, with thousands of daily visitors.

== 1932 MoMA exhibition ==
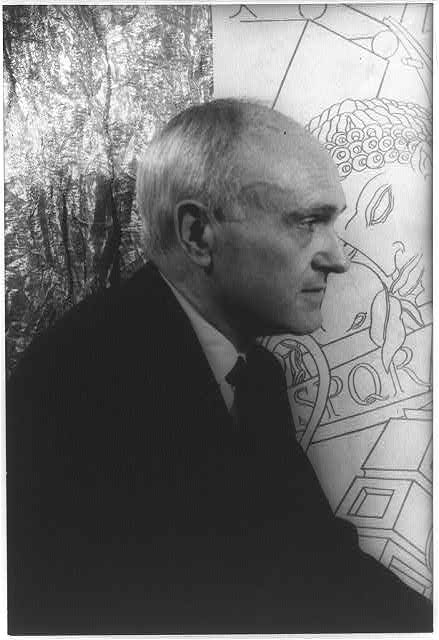
Philip Johnson co-defined the International Style with Henry-Russell Hitchcock as a young college graduate, and later became one of its practitioners.

The exhibition Modern Architecture: International Exhibition ran from February 9 to March 23, 1932, at the Museum of Modern Art (MoMA), in the Heckscher Building at Fifth Avenue and 56th Street in New York. Beyond a foyer and office, the exhibition was divided into six rooms: the "Modern Architects" section began in the entrance room, featuring a model of William Lescaze's Chrystie-Forsyth Street Housing Development in New York. From there visitors moved to the centrally placed Room A, featuring a model of a mid-rise housing development for Evanston, Illinois, by Chicago architect brothers Monroe Bengt Bowman and Irving Bowman, as well as a model and photos of Walter Gropius's Bauhaus building in Dessau. In the largest exhibition space, Room C, were works by Le Corbusier, Ludwig Mies van der Rohe, J. J. P. Oud and Frank Lloyd Wright (including a project for a house on the Mesa in Denver, 1932). Room B was a section titled "Housing", presenting "the need for a new domestic environment" as it had been identified by historian and critic Lewis Mumford. In Room D were works by Raymond Hood (including "Apartment Tower in the Country" and the McGraw-Hill Building) and Richard Neutra. In Room E was a section titled "The extent of modern architecture", added at the last minute, which included the works of thirty-seven modern architects from fifteen countries who were said to be influenced by the works of Europeans of the 1920s. Among these works was shown Alvar Aalto's Turun Sanomat newspaper offices building in Turku, Finland.

After a six-week run in New York City, the exhibition then toured the US – the first such "traveling-exhibition" of architecture in the US – for six years.

=== Curators ===
MoMA director Alfred H. Barr hired architectural historian and critic Henry-Russell Hitchcock and Philip Johnson to curate the museum's first architectural exhibition. The three of them toured Europe together in 1929 and had also discussed Hitchcock's book about modern art. By December 1930, the first written proposal for an exhibition of the "new architecture" was set down, yet the first draft of the book was not complete until some months later.

=== Publications ===
The 1932 exhibition led to two publications by Hitchcock and Johnson:

- The exhibition catalog Modern Architecture: International Exhibition
- The book The International Style: Architecture Since 1922, published by W. W. Norton & Co. in 1932.
  - reprinted in 1997 by W. W. Norton & Company

Previous to the 1932 exhibition and book, Hitchcock had concerned himself with the themes of modern architecture in his 1929 book Modern Architecture: Romanticism and Reintegration.

According to Terence Riley: "Ironically the (exhibition) catalogue, and to some extent, the book The International Style, published at the same time of the exhibition, have supplanted the actual historical event."

=== Exemplary uses of the International Style ===
The following architects and buildings were selected by Hitchcock and Johnson for display at the exhibition Modern Architecture: International Exhibition:

Architect	Building	Location	Date
Jacobus Oud	Workers Houses (house blocks Kiefhoek)	Rotterdam, The Netherlands	1924–1927
Otto Eisler	Semi-detached Villa	Brno, Czech Republic	1926–1927
Walter Gropius	Fagus Factory	Alfeld, Germany	1911
Walter Gropius	Bauhaus School	Dessau, Germany	1926
Walter Gropius	City Employment Office	Dessau, Germany	1928
Ludwig Mies van der Rohe	Apartment House, Weissenhof Estate	Stuttgart, Germany	1927
Ludwig Mies van der Rohe	German pavilion at the Barcelona Expo	Barcelona, Spain	1929
Ludwig Mies van der Rohe	Villa Tugendhat	Brno, Czech Republic	1930
Le Corbusier	Villa Stein	Garches, France	1927
Le Corbusier	Villa Savoye	Poissy, France	1930
Le Corbusier	Carlos de Beistegui Champs-Élysées Penthouse	Paris, France	1931
Erich Mendelsohn	Schocken Department Store	Chemnitz, Germany	1928–1930
Frederick John Kiesler	Film Guild Cinema	(United States) New York City, US	1929
Raymond Hood	McGraw-Hill Building	(United States) New York City, US	1931
George Howe & William Lescaze	Loews Philadelphia Hotel	(United States) Philadelphia, US	1932
Monroe Bengt Bowman & Irving Bowman	Lux apartment block	(United States) Evanston, US	1931
Richard Neutra	Lovell House	(United States) Los Angeles, US	1929
Otto Haesler	Rothenberg Siedlung	Kassel, Germany	1930
Karl Schneider	Kunstverein	Hamburg, Germany	1930
Alvar Aalto	Turun Sanomat building	Turku, Finland	1930

Villa Savoye, Paris, Le Corbusier

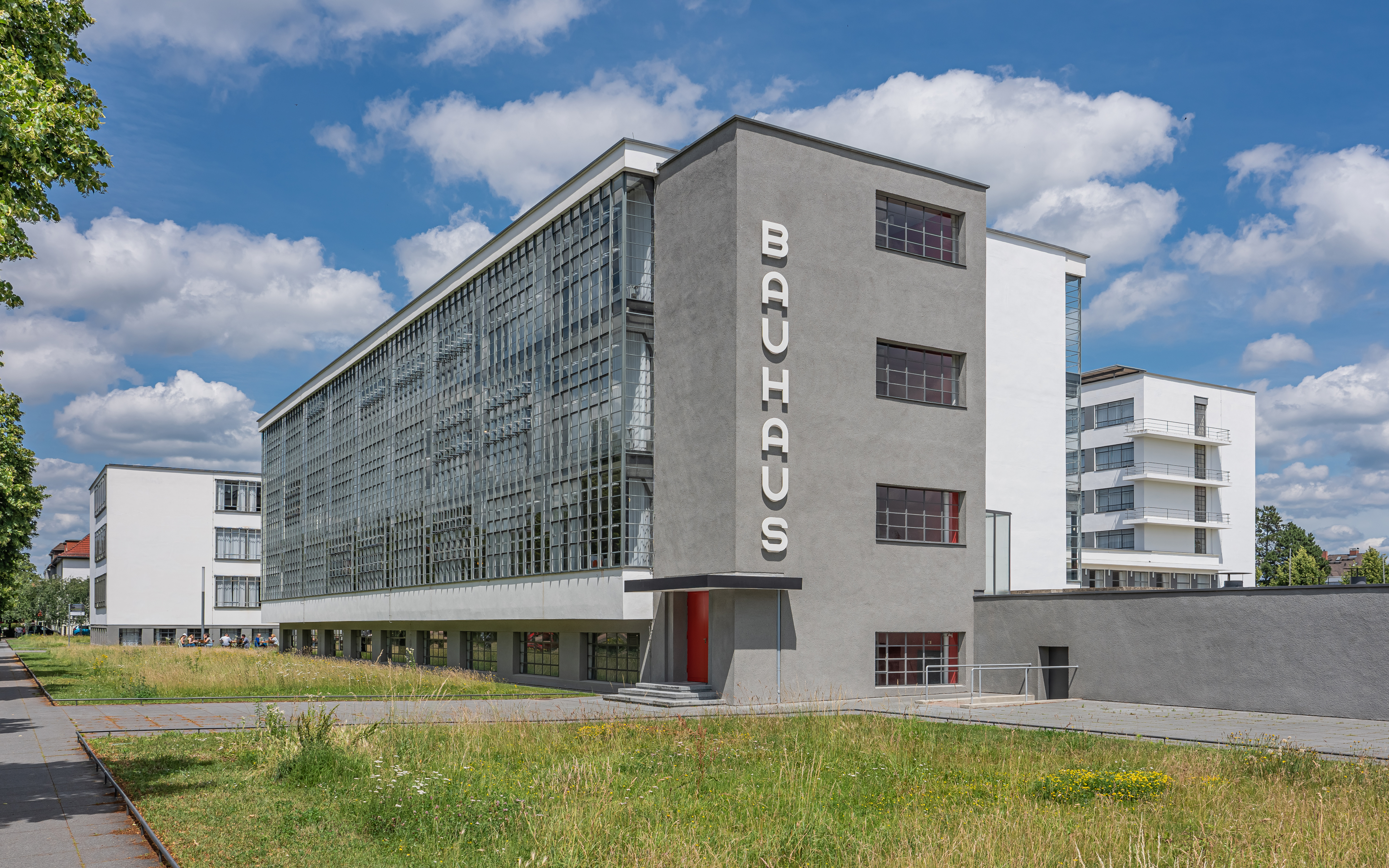
Bauhaus School, Dessau, Walter Gropius

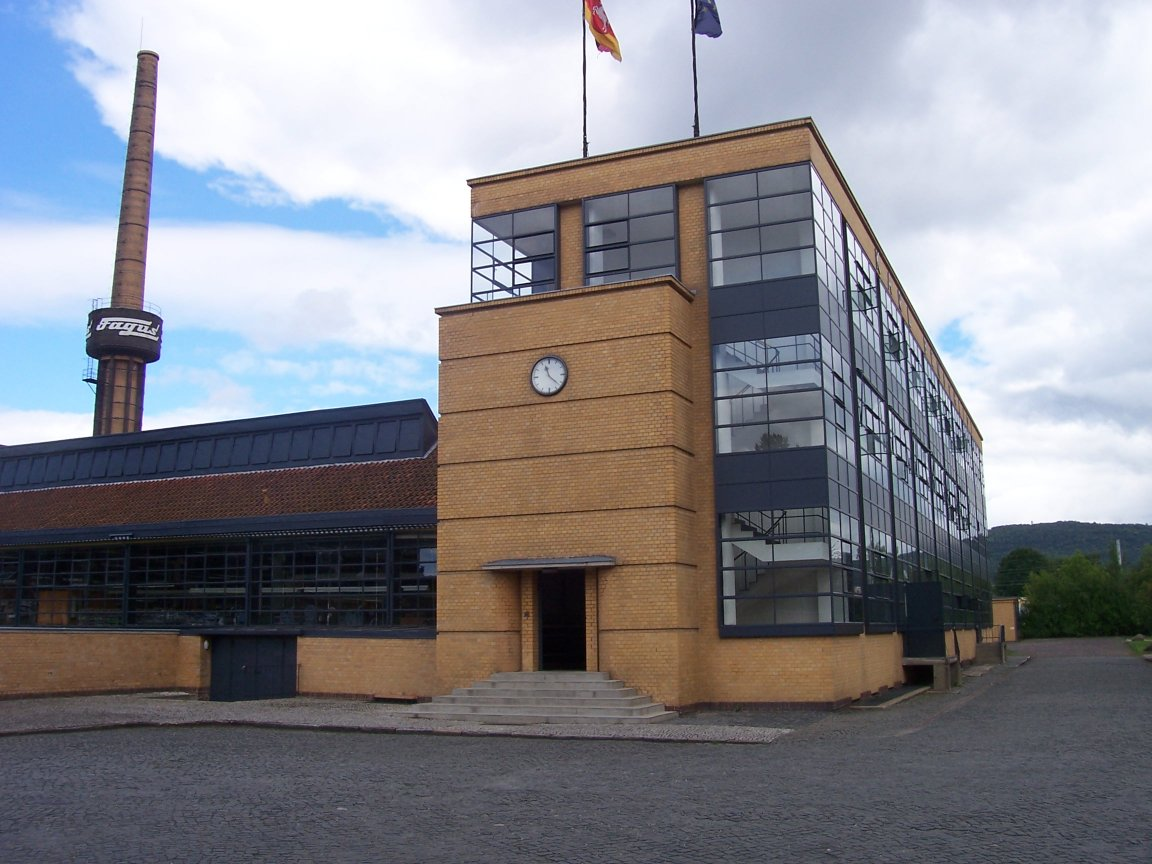
Fagus Factory, Alfeld, Walter Gropius

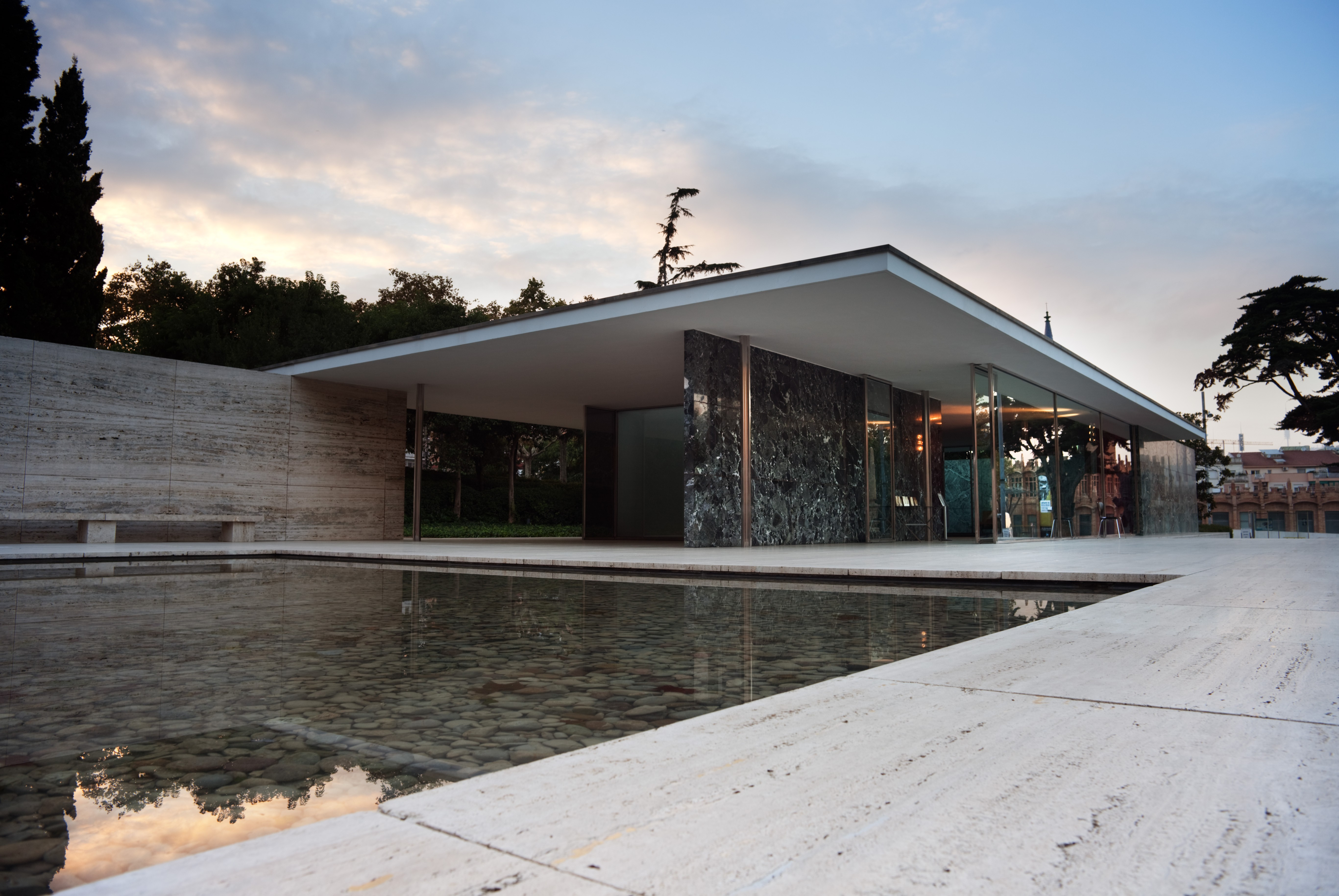
German Pavilion, Barcelona, Mies van der Rohe

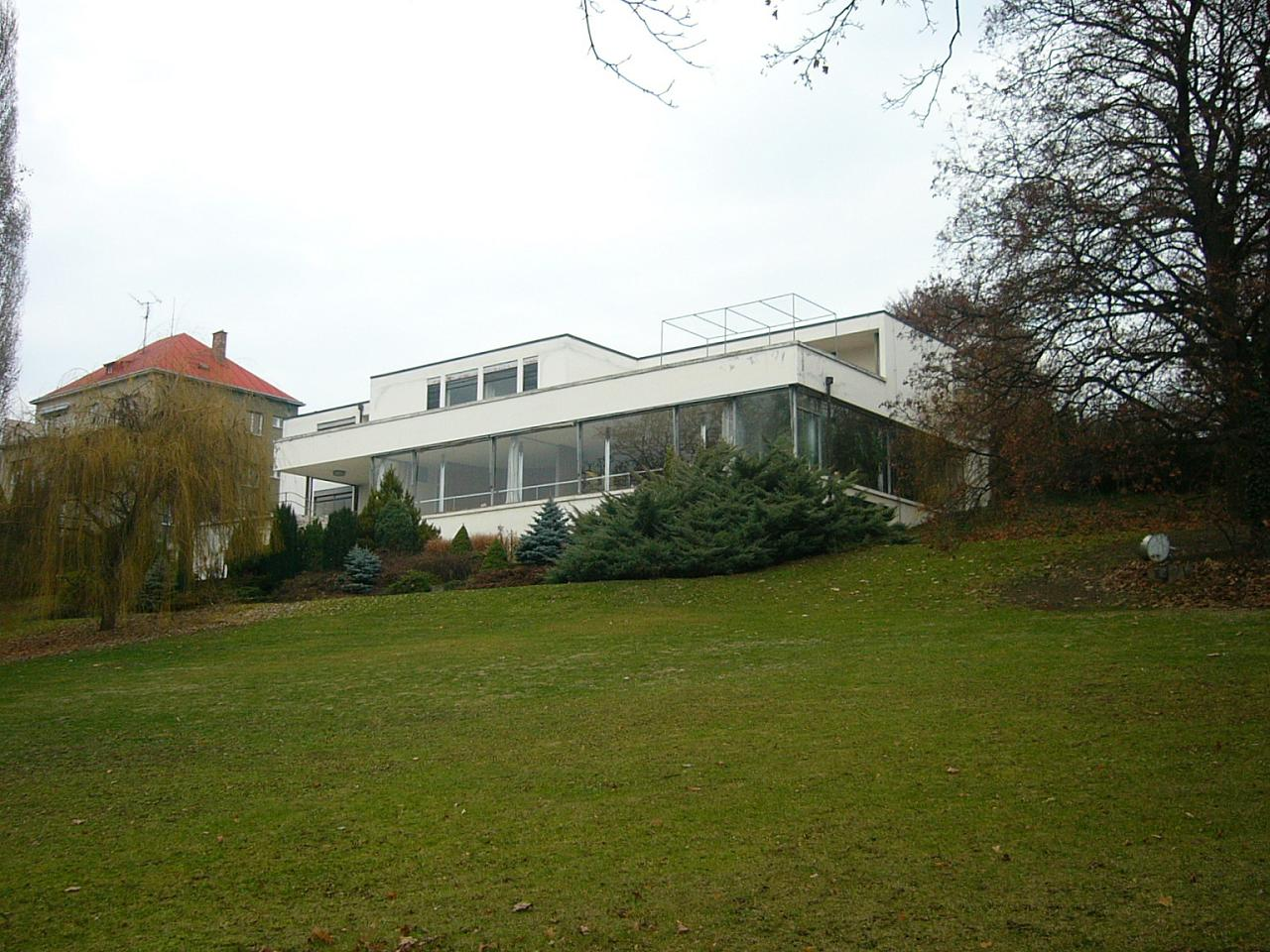
Villa Tugendhat, Brno, Mies van der Rohe

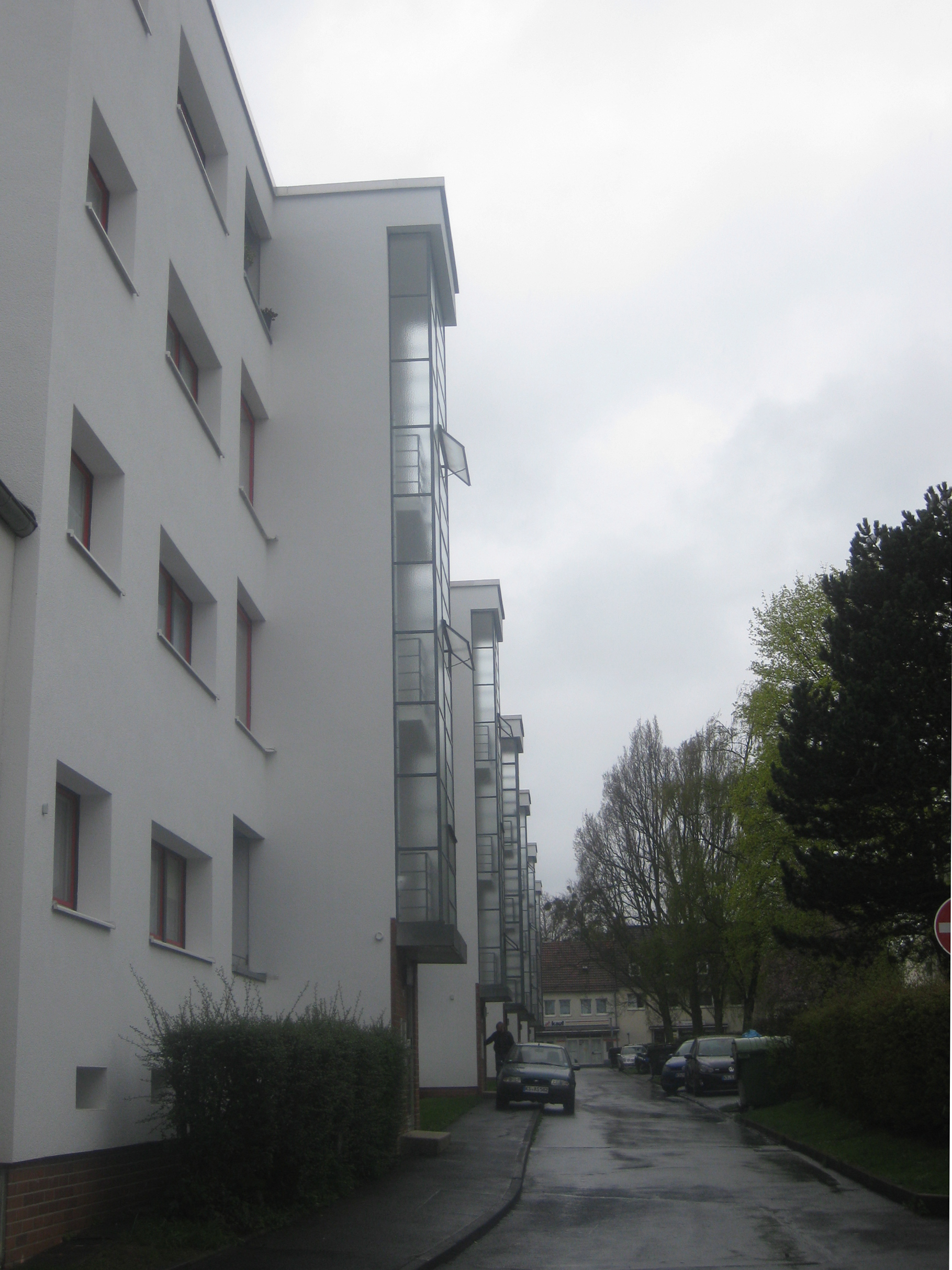
Rothenberg Siedlung, Kassel, Otto Haesler

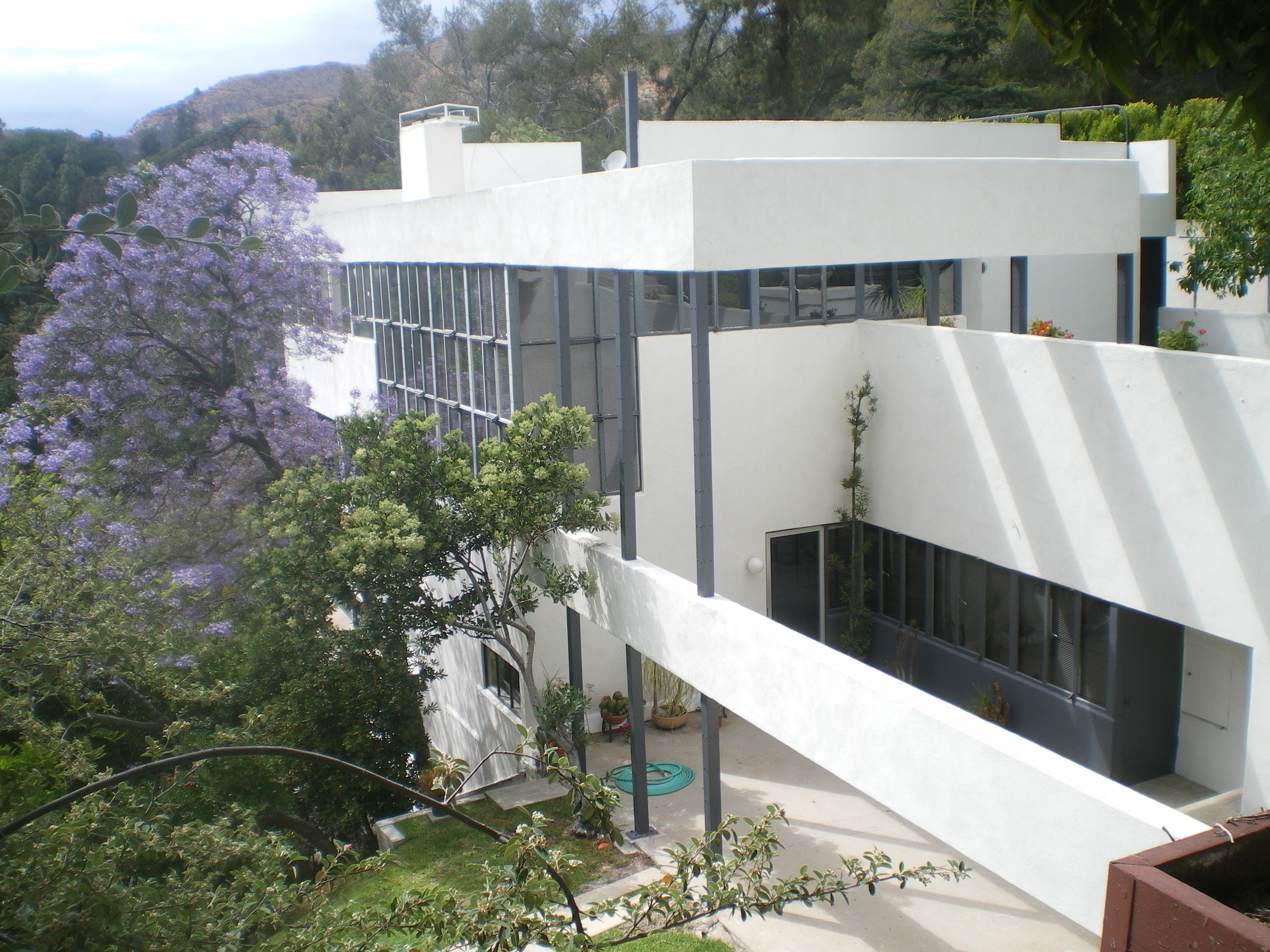
Lovell House, Los Angeles, Rudolph Schindler (garden by Richard Neutra)

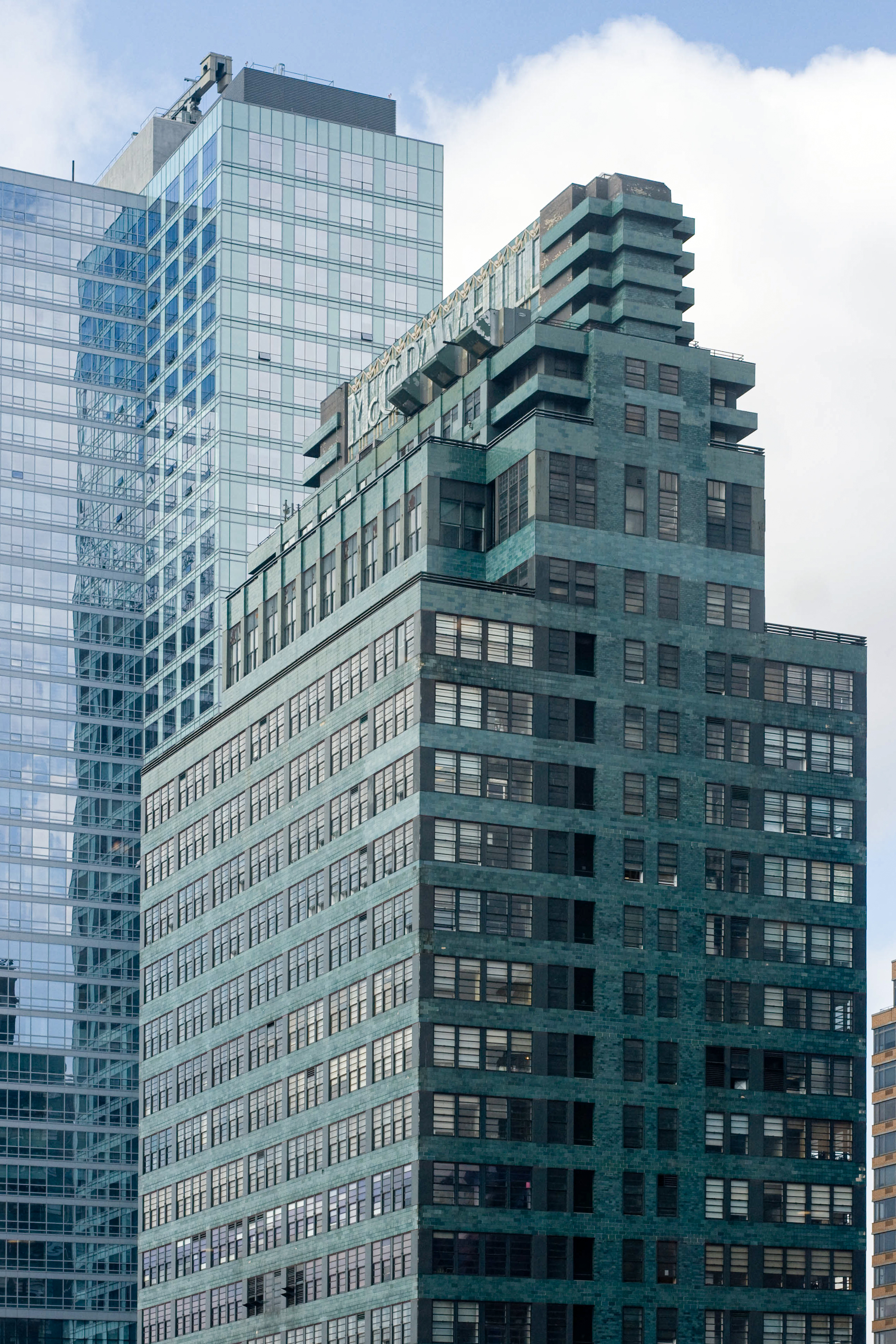
McGraw-Hill Building, New York City, Raymond Hood

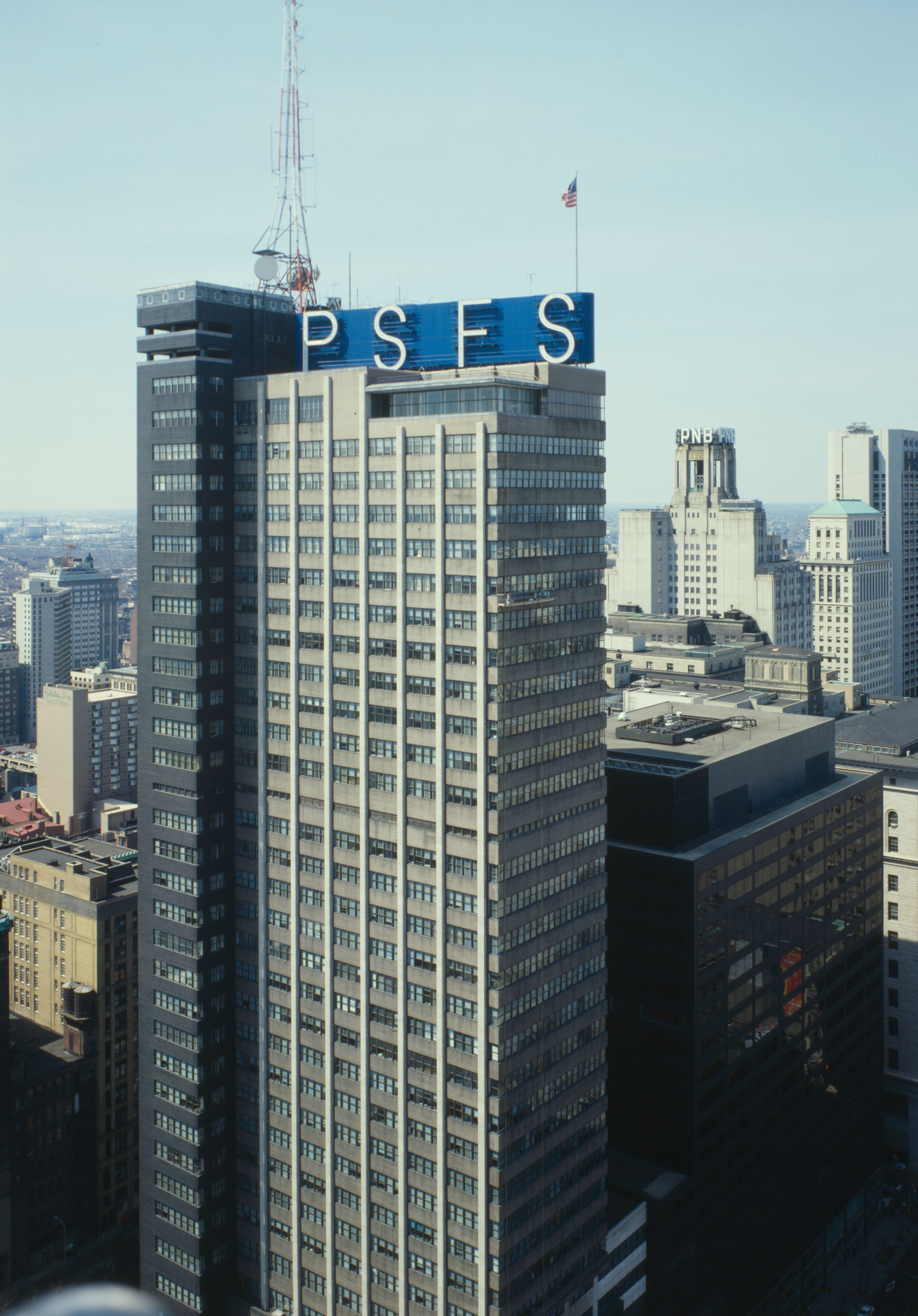
Loews Philadelphia Hotel, Philadelphia, George Howe and William Lescaze

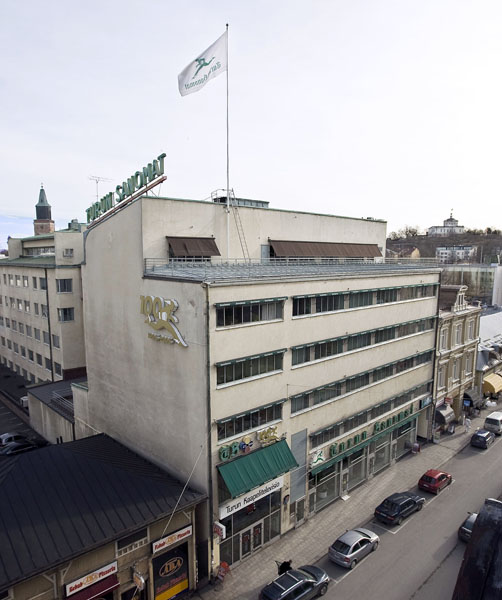
Turun Sanomat, Turku, Alvar Aalto

=== Notable omissions ===
The exhibition excluded other contemporary styles that were exploring the boundaries of architecture at the time, including: Art Deco; German Expressionism, for instance the works of Hermann Finsterlin; and the organicist movement, popularized in the work of Antoni Gaudí. As a result of the 1932 exhibition, the principles of the International Style were endorsed, while other styles were classed less significant.

In 1922, the competition for the Tribune Tower and its famous second-place entry by Eliel Saarinen gave some indication of what was to come, though these works would not have been accepted by Hitchcock and Johnson as representing the "International Style". Similarly, Johnson, writing about Joseph Urban's recently completed New School for Social Research in New York, stated: "In the New School we have an anomaly of a building supposed to be in a style of architecture based on the development of the plan from function and facade from plan but which is a formally and pretentiously conceived as a Renaissance palace. Urban's admiration for the New Style is more complete than his understanding."

California architect Rudolph Schindler's work was not a part of the exhibit, though Schindler had pleaded with Hitchcock and Johnson to be included. Then, "[f]or more than 20 years, Schindler had intermittently launched a series of spirited, cantankerous exchanges with the museum."

== Before 1932 ==
Architect	Building	Location	Date
Johannes Duiker and Bernard Bijvoet	Zonnestraal Sanatorium	Hilversum, Netherlands	1926–1928
Robert Mallet-Stevens	houses on Rue Mallet-Stevens	Paris, France	1927
Robert Mallet-Stevens	Villa Cavrois	Croix, France	1929
Eileen Gray	E-1027	Cap Martin, France	1929
Alejandro Bustillo	Victoria Ocampo House	Buenos Aires, Argentina	1929
Sergio Larraín García-Moreno and Jorge Arteaga	Oberpaur Building	Santiago, Chile	1929–1930
Alvar Aalto	Paimio Sanatorium	Turku, Finland	1930
Leendert van der Vlugt	Van Nelle Factory	Rotterdam, Netherlands	1926–1930
Joseph Emberton	Royal Corinthian Yacht Club	(United Kingdom) Essex, England	1931

== 1932–1944 ==
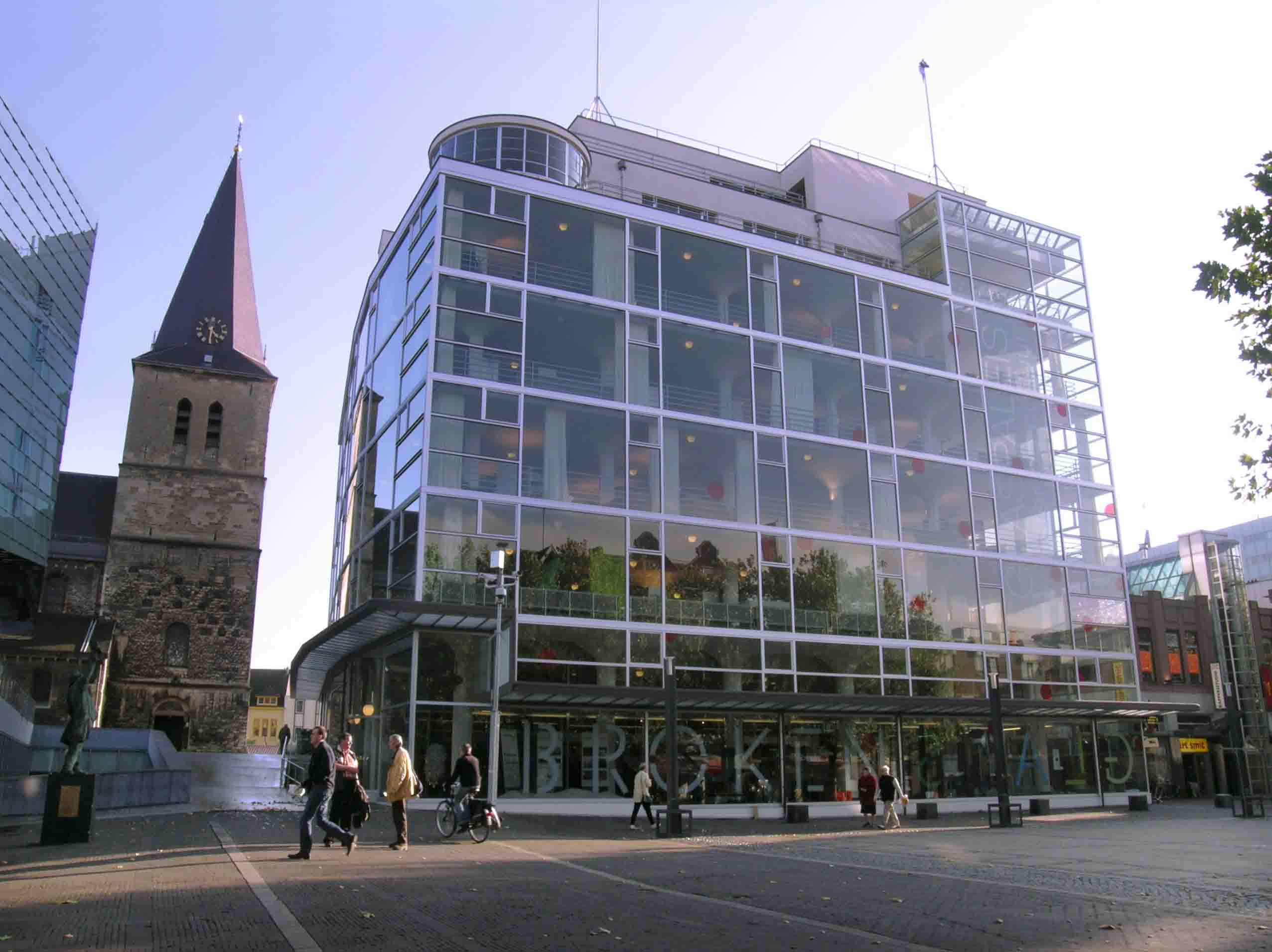
The Glass Palace, Heerlen, Netherlands, Frits Peutz (1935)

The gradual rise of the Nazi regime in Weimar Germany in the 1930s, and the Nazis' rejection of modern architecture, meant that an entire generation of avant-gardist architects, many of them Jews, were forced out of continental Europe. Some, such as Mendelsohn, found shelter in England, while a considerable number of the Jewish architects made their way to Palestine, and others to the US. However, American anti-Communist politics after the war and Philip Johnson's influential rejection of functionalism have tended to mask the fact that many of the important architects, including contributors to the original Weissenhof project, fled to the Soviet Union.

This group also tended to be far more concerned with functionalism and its social agenda. Bruno Taut, Mart Stam, the second Bauhaus director Hannes Meyer, Ernst May and other important figures of the International Style went to the Soviet Union in 1930 to undertake huge, ambitious, idealistic urban planning projects, building entire cities from scratch. In 1936, when Stalin ordered them out of the country, many of these architects became stateless and sought refuge elsewhere; for example, Ernst May moved to Kenya.

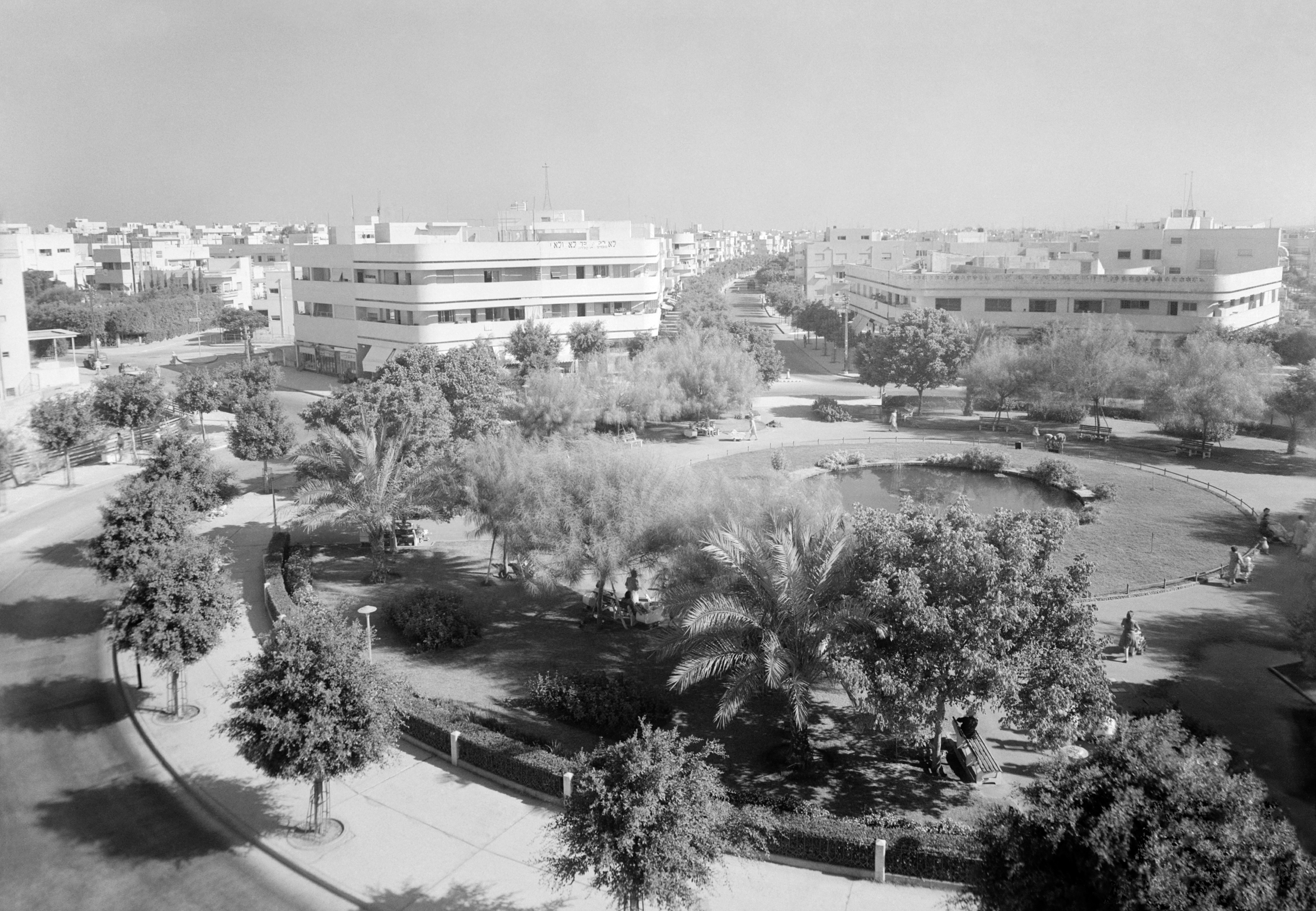
Dizengoff Circle, White City, Tel Aviv, by Genia Averbuch (1934)

The White City of Tel Aviv is a collection of over 4,000 buildings built in the International Style in the 1930s. Many Jewish architects who had studied at the German Bauhaus school designed significant buildings here. A large proportion of the buildings built in the International Style can be found in the area planned by Patrick Geddes, north of Tel Aviv's main historical commercial center. In 1994, UNESCO proclaimed the White City a World Heritage Site, describing the city as "a synthesis of outstanding significance of the various trends of the Modern Movement in architecture and town planning in the early part of the 20th century". In 1996, Tel Aviv's White City was listed as a World Monuments Fund endangered site.

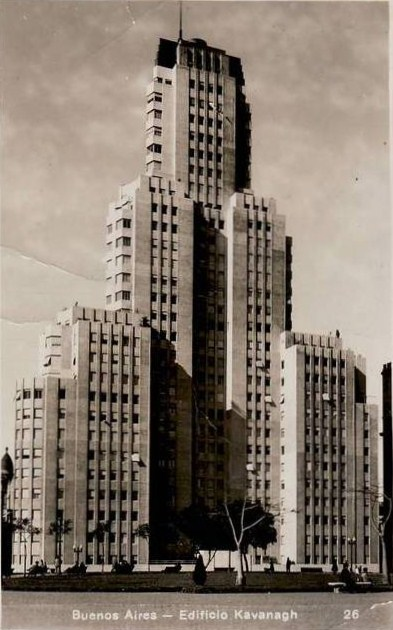
The Kavanagh Building in Buenos Aires, by Sánchez, Lagos & de la Torre (1936)

The residential area of Södra Ängby in western Stockholm, Sweden, blended an international or functionalist style with garden city ideals. Encompassing more than 500 buildings, most of them designed by Edvin Engström, it remains the largest coherent functionalist or "International Style" villa area in Sweden and possibly the world, still well-preserved more than a half-century after its construction in 1933–40 and protected as a national cultural heritage.

Zlín is a city in the Czech Republic which was in the 1930s completely reconstructed on principles of functionalism. In that time the city was a headquarters of Bata Shoes company and Tomáš Baťa initiated a complex reconstruction of the city which was inspired by functionalism and the Garden city movement. Tomas Bata Memorial is the most valuable monument of the Zlín functionalism. It is a modern paraphrase of the constructions of high gothic style period: the supporting system and colourful stained glass and the reinforced concrete skeleton and glass.

With the rise of Nazism, a number of key European modern architects fled to the US. When Walter Gropius and Marcel Breuer fled Germany they both arrived at the Harvard Graduate School of Design, in an excellent position to extend their influence and promote the Bauhaus as the primary source of architectural modernism. When Mies fled in 1938, he first fled to England, but on emigrating to the US he went to Chicago, founded the Second School of Chicago at IIT and solidified his reputation as a prototypical modern architect.

Architect	Building	Location	Date
Ove Arup	Labworth Café	(United Kingdom) Essex, England	1932–1933
Jorge Kálnay	Luna Park	Buenos Aires, Argentina	1932
Leendert van der Vlugt	Sonneveld House	Rotterdam, Netherlands	1932–1933
Carlos Ramos	Radio Pavilion of the Oncology Institute	Lisbon, Portugal	1933
Hans Scharoun	Schminke House	Löbau, Germany	1933
Frits Peutz	Glaspaleis	Heerlen, Netherlands	1933
František Lydie Gahura	Tomas Bata Memorial	Zlín, Czech Republic	1933
Oscar Stonorov and Alfred Kastner	Carl Mackley Houses	(United States) Philadelphia, US	1933–1934
Edvin Engström	Södra Ängby	Stockholm, Sweden	1933–1939
Genia Averbuch	Dizengoff Square	Tel Aviv, Israel	1934–1938
Dov Karmi	Max-Liebling House	Tel Aviv, Israel	1936
Yehuda Lulka	Thermometer House	Tel Aviv, Israel	1935
Erich Mendelsohn	Weizmann House	Rehovot, Israel	1936
Wells Coates	Isokon building	(United Kingdom) London, England	1934
Berthold Lubetkin	Highpoint I	(United Kingdom) London, England	1935
Maxwell Fry	Sun House	(United Kingdom) London, England	1935
Neil & Hurd	Ravelston Garden	(United Kingdom) Edinburgh, Scotland	1936
Sánchez, Lagos & de la Torre	Kavanagh Building	Buenos Aires, Argentina	1936
Paul Thiry	Thiry House	(United States) Seattle, Washington, US	1936
Walter Gropius	Gropius House	(United States) Lincoln, Massachusetts, US	1937–1938
Hamilton Beatty and Allen Strang	Willard and Fern Tompkins House	(United States) Monona, Wisconsin, US	1937
William Ganster and William Pereira	Lake County Tuberculosis Sanatorium	(United States) Waukegan, Illinois, US	1938–1939

== 1945–present ==
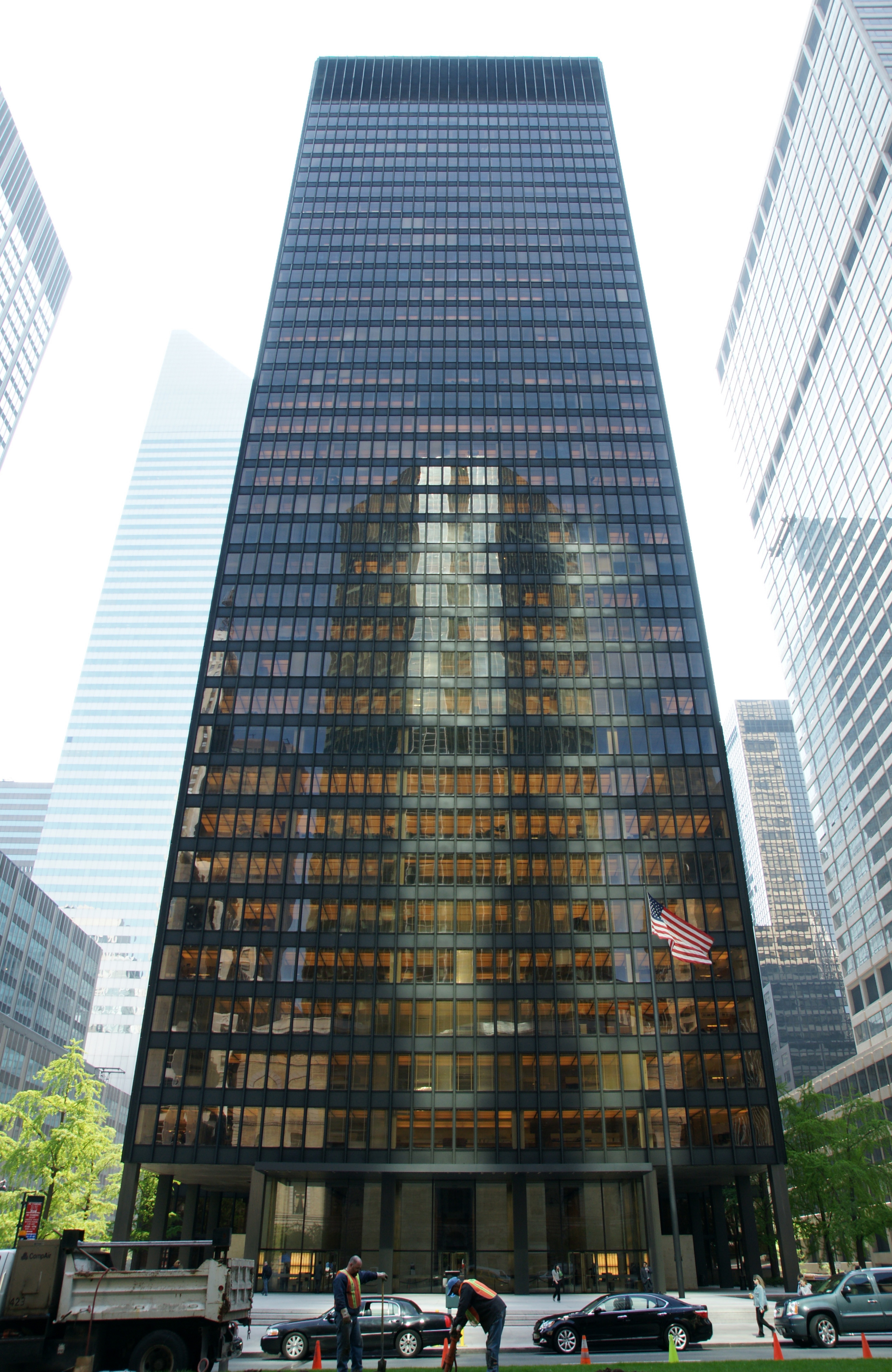
Seagram Building, New York, Ludwig Mies van der Rohe (1958)

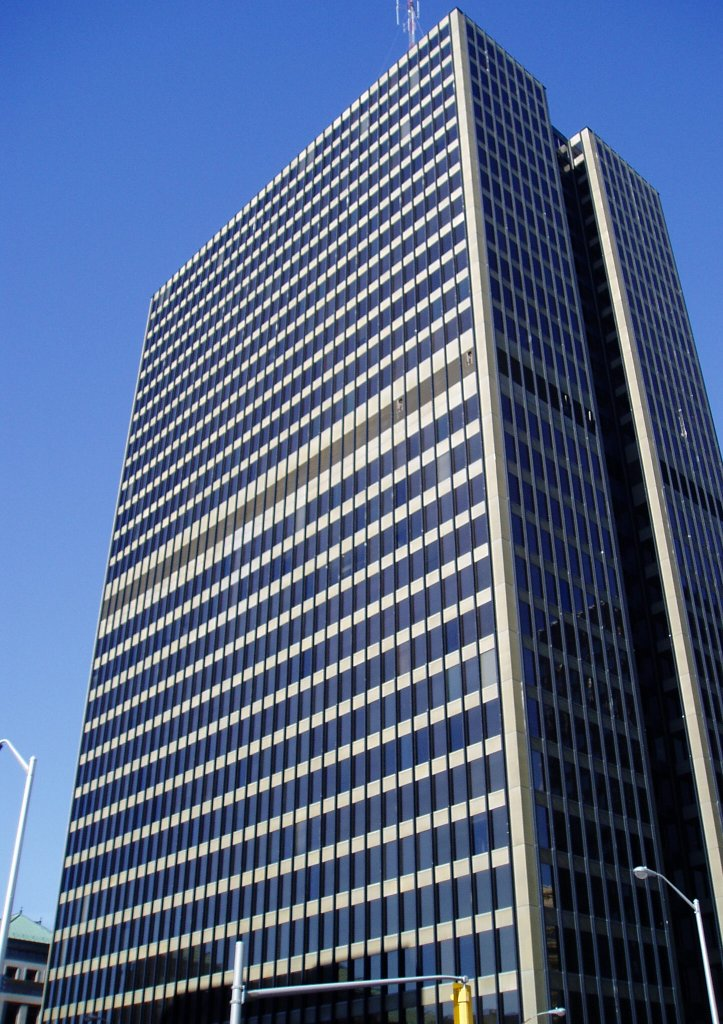
Tower C of Place de Ville

After World War II, the International Style matured; Hellmuth, Obata & Kassabaum (later renamed HOK) and Skidmore, Owings & Merrill (SOM) perfected the corporate practice, and it became the dominant approach for decades in the US and Canada. Beginning with the initial technical and formal inventions of 860-880 Lake Shore Drive Apartments in Chicago, its most famous examples include the United Nations headquarters, the Lever House, the Seagram Building in New York City, and the campus of the United States Air Force Academy in Colorado Springs, Colorado, as well as the Toronto-Dominion Centre in Toronto. Further examples can be found in mid-century institutional buildings throughout North America and the "corporate architecture" spread from there, especially to Europe.

In Canada, this period coincided with a major building boom and few restrictions on massive building projects. International Style skyscrapers came to dominate many of Canada's major cities, especially Ottawa, Montreal, Vancouver, Calgary, Edmonton, Hamilton, and Toronto. While these glass boxes were at first unique and interesting, the idea was soon repeated to the point of ubiquity. A typical example is the development of so-called Place de Ville, a conglomeration of three glass skyscrapers in downtown Ottawa, where the plans of the property developer Robert Campeau in the mid-1960s and early 1970s—in the words of historian Robert W. Collier, were "forceful and abrasive[;] he was not well-loved at City Hall"—had no regard for existing city plans, and "built with contempt for the existing city and for city responsibilities in the key areas of transportation and land use". Architects attempted to put new twists into such towers, such as the Toronto City Hall by Finnish architect Viljo Revell. By the late 1970s a backlash was under way against modernism—prominent anti-modernists such as Jane Jacobs and George Baird were partly based in Toronto.

The typical International Style or "corporate architecture" high-rise usually consists of the following:

1. Square or rectangular footprint
2. Simple cubic "extruded rectangle" form
3. Windows running in broken horizontal rows forming a grid
4. All facade angles are 90 degrees.

In 2000 UNESCO proclaimed University City of Caracas in Caracas, Venezuela, as a World Heritage Site, describing it as "a masterpiece of modern city planning, architecture and art, created by the Venezuelan architect Carlos Raúl Villanueva and a group of distinguished avant-garde artists".

In June 2007 UNESCO proclaimed Ciudad Universitaria of the Universidad Nacional Autónoma de México (UNAM), in Mexico City, a World Heritage Site due to its relevance and contribution in terms of international style movement. It was designed in the late 1940s and built in the mid-1950s based upon a masterplan created by architect Enrique del Moral. His original idea was enriched by other students, teachers, and diverse professionals of several disciplines. The university houses murals by Diego Rivera, Juan O'Gorman and others. The university also features Olympic Stadium (1968). In his first years of practice, Pritzker Prize winner and Mexican architect Luis Barragán designed buildings in the International Style. But later he evolved to a more traditional local architecture. Other notable Mexican architects of the International Style or modern period are Carlos Obregón Santacilia, Augusto H. Alvarez, Mario Pani, Federico Mariscal, Vladimir Kaspé, Enrique del Moral, Juan Sordo Madaleno, Max Cetto, among many others.

In Brazil Oscar Niemeyer proposed a more organic and sensual International Style. He designed the political landmarks (headquarters of the three state powers) of the new, planned capital Brasília. The masterplan for the city was proposed by Lúcio Costa.

In Iran, Dariush Borbor innitiated the free-flowing curvilinear architecture. He designed the House Arjomand in Kerman, 1961, the restaurant, Persian Pavillion, Los Angeles 1964, and House Nahavandi, Tehran 1965, and Women's Organization Centre, Ahwaz, 1966.

Architect	Building	Location	Date
Ludwig Mies van der Rohe	Illinois Institute of Technology campus (including S. R. Crown Hall)	(United States) Chicago, US	1945–1960
Ludwig Mies van der Rohe	860–880 Lake Shore Drive Apartments	(United States) Chicago, US	1949
Pietro Belluschi	Commonwealth Building	(United States) Portland, Oregon, US	1948
Oscar Niemeyer, Le Corbusier, Harrison & Abramovitz	Headquarters of the United Nations	(United States) New York City, US	1950s
Michael Scott	Busaras	(Republic of Ireland) Dublin, Ireland	1945–1953
Kemp, Bunch & Jackson	Eight Forty One	(United States) Jacksonville, US	1955
Ron Phillips and Alan Fitch	City Hall, Hong Kong	Central, Hong Kong, China	1956
Alberto Belgrano Blanco, José A. Hortal and Marcelo Martínez de Hoz	Alas Building	Buenos Aires, Argentina	1957
John Bland	Old City Hall	Ottawa, Canada	1958
Emery Roth & Sons	10 Lafayette Square	(United States) Buffalo, New York, US	1958–1959
Kelly & Gruzen	High School of Graphic Communication Arts	(United States) Manhattan, New York City, US	1959
Arne Jacobsen	SAS Royal Hotel	Copenhagen, Denmark	1958–60
Stanley Roscoe	Hamilton City Hall	Hamilton, Canada	1960
John Lautner	Chemosphere	(United States) Los Angeles, US	1960
Emilio Duhart	ECLAC Headquarters	Santiago, Chile	1960–66
Carlos Arguelles	Philamlife Building	Manila, Philippines	1961
Dariush Borbor	House Arjomand	Kerman, Iran	1961
I. M. Pei	Place Ville-Marie	Montreal, Canada	1962
Charles Luckman	Prudential Tower	(United States) Boston, US	1964
Carlos Arguelles	Philippine National Bank Head Office (Escolta)	Manila, Philippines	1965-2015
George Dahl	First National Bank Tower	(United States) Dallas, US	1965
Abugov & Sunderland	CN Tower	Edmonton, Canada	1966
Various architects	Montreal Metro, initial network	Montreal, Canada	1966
Ludwig Mies van der Rohe	Toronto-Dominion Centre	Toronto, Canada	1967
Ludwig Mies van der Rohe	Westmount Square	Montreal, Canada	1967
Skidmore, Owings & Merrill	Equitable Building	(United States) Atlanta, US	1968
Hermann Henselmann et al.	Berlin TV Tower	Berlin, Germany	1969
Michael Manser	Capel Manor House	(United Kingdom) Horsmonden, UK	1971
Campeau Corporation	Place de Ville	Ottawa, Canada	1967–1972
Arthur C.F. Lau	Stelco Tower	Hamilton, Canada	1973
Crang & Boake	Hudson's Bay Centre	Toronto, Canada	1974
Jerzy Skrzypczak	Chałubińskiego 8	Warsaw, Poland	1975–1978
Friedrich Silaban	Borobudur Hotel	Jakarta, Indonesia	1974
Friedrich Silaban	Istiqlal Mosque	Jakarta, Indonesia	1978
Pedro Moctezuma Díaz Infante	Torre Ejecutiva Pemex	Mexico City, Mexico	1982

== Criticism ==
In 1930, Frank Lloyd Wright wrote: "Human houses should not be like boxes, blazing in the sun, nor should we outrage the Machine by trying to make dwelling-places too complementary to Machinery."

In Elizabeth Gordon's well-known 1953 essay, "The Threat to the Next America", she criticized the style as non-practical, citing many instances where "glass houses" are too hot in summer and too cold in winter, empty, take away private space, lack beauty and generally are not livable. Moreover, she accused this style's proponents of taking away a sense of beauty from people and thus covertly pushing for a totalitarian society.

In 1966, architect Robert Venturi published Complexity and Contradiction in Architecture, essentially a book-length critique of the International Style. Architectural historian Vincent Scully regarded Venturi's book as 'probably the most important writing on the making of architecture since Le Corbusier's Vers une Architecture. It helped to define postmodernism.

Best-selling American author Tom Wolfe wrote a book-length critique, From Bauhaus to Our House, portraying the style as elitist.

One of the supposed strengths of the International Style has been said to be that the design solutions were indifferent to location, site, and climate; the solutions were supposed to be universally applicable; the style made no reference to local history or national vernacular. This was soon identified as one of the style's primary weaknesses.

In 2006, Hugh Pearman, the British architectural critic of The Times, observed that those using the style today are simply "another species of revivalist", noting the irony. The negative reaction to internationalist modernism has been linked to public antipathy to overall development.

In the preface to the fourth edition of his book Modern Architecture: A Critical History (2007), Kenneth Frampton argued that there had been a "disturbing Eurocentric bias" in histories of modern architecture. This "Eurocentrism" included the US.

== Architects ==
- Alvar Aalto
- Max Abramovitz
- The Architects Collaborative
- Luis Barragán
- Geoffrey Bazeley
- Welton Becket
- Pietro Belluschi
- Max Bill
- Dariush Borbor
- Marcel Breuer
- Gordon Bunshaft
- Roberto Burle Marx
- Henry N. Cobb
- George Dahl
- Natalie de Blois
- Emilio Duhart
- Charles and Ray Eames
- Otto Eisler
- Arieh El-Hanani
- Joseph Emberton
- Bohuslav Fuchs
- Heydar Ghiai
- Sir Frederick Gibberd
- Landis Gores
- Bruce Graham
- Eileen Gray
- Walter Gropius
- Otto Haesler
- Wallace Harrison
- Hermann Henselmann
- Raymond Hood
- George Howe
- Muzharul Islam
- Toyo Ito
- Arne Jacobsen
- Marcel Janco
- John M. Johansen
- Philip Johnson
- Roger Johnson
- Louis Kahn
- Dov Karmi
- Richard Kauffmann
- Oskar Kaufmann
- Fazlur Khan
- Frederick John Kiesler
- Sergio Larraín García-Moreno
- Le Corbusier
- William Lescaze
- Charles Luckman
- Yehuda Magidovitch
- Michael Manser
- Alfred Mansfeld
- Erich Mendelsohn
- John O. Merrill
- Hannes Meyer
- Ludwig Mies van der Rohe
- Richard Neutra
- Oscar Niemeyer
- Eliot Noyes
- Gyo Obata
- Jacobus Oud
- Nathaniel A. Owings
- Mario Pani
- I. M. Pei
- Frits Peutz
- Ernst Plischke
- Ralph Rapson
- Zeev Rechter
- Viljo Revell
- Gerrit Rietveld
- Carl Rubin
- Eero Saarinen
- Rudolph Schindler
- Michael Scott
- Arieh Sharon
- Ben-Ami Shulman
- Friedrich Silaban
- Louis Skidmore
- Jerzy Sołtan
- Raphael Soriano
- Edward Durell Stone
- Paul Thiry
- Carlos Raúl Villanueva
- Leendert van der Vlugt
- Munio Weinraub
- Lloyd Wright
- Minoru Yamasaki

== See also ==
- Critical regionalism – Approach to architecture
- Expressionist architecture – Architectural style
- Functionalism (architecture) – Principle that defines a type of architecture
- High-tech architecture – Architectural style that emerged in the 1970s
- International Typographic Style – 20th-century European graphic design style
- Modern architecture – 20th-century movement and style
- Northwest Regional style – Mid-20th century American architectural style
- Organic architecture – Philosophy of architecture
- Swiss Style (design) – Trend in graphic design
