= Emilio Duhart =

Chilean architect

Emilio Duhart Harosteguy
- Born: 1917; Temuco
- Died: January 2, 2006 (aged 88–89); Ustaritz, Labort
- Education: Universidad Católica de Chile; Harvard University
- Occupation: Architect
- Spouse: Raquel Echeverría
- Children: Michelle, Solange, Emilio and Violaine
- Awards: National Architecture Award of Chile (1977); National Order of Merit (France) (1982)
- Buildings: Edificio de la CEPAL; Aeropuerto Arturo Merino Benítez; Ampliación del campus UdeC; Centro urbano y Parque Antigua Aduana; Edificio Arauco; Colegio Suizo de Santiago; Colegio del Verbo Divino
- Projects: Ciudad Universitaria de Concepción

Emilio Duhart Harosteguy (1917 in Temuco – January 2, 2006 in Ustaritz, Labort) was a Chilean architect, representative of modern architecture and considered to be one of the most relevant urbanists of the 20th century.

Duhart's work was profoundly influenced by Le Corbusier's and Walter Gropius' theories, with whom he collaborated in several projects.

== Biography ==
=== Youth ===
Emilio Duhart's family immigrated from the French province of Labort, in the French Basque Country, to southern Chile. He lived in France during his infancy and basic education.

He started a relationship with Raquel Echeverría, who would later become his wife; they had four children and several grandchildren.

=== Professional career ===
In 1935, Duhart started his Architecture studies at the Pontifical Catholic University of Chile (PCUC), and graduated in 1941. In the same year, he started working on rural populations in Chillán, affected by the 1939 earthquake.

In 1942, he moved to the United States, where he studied Architecture at Harvard University. In 1943, he graduated under the supervision of architects Walter Gropius and John M. Gauss. He later served as Gropius' assistant and as Konrad Waschmann's assistant at General Panel Corporation Prefabricated Housing. During this stay at Harvard, Duhart became acquainted with the Modern Architecture movement that would become a cornerstone in his career.

=== Career in Chile ===
Duhart returned to Chile at some point in the 40s, he worked along Sergio Larraín García-Moreno— founder of the Chilean Museum of Precolumbian Art,— in several architectural projects: housing, industrial buildings, and urban planning, among others.

Besides his work as an architect, Duhart also worked in academia and union matters. In 1946, he was elected counselor at the National College of Architects in Chile, and in 1951, he returned to the PCUC to work as a teacher where he would later become director of the Urbanism, Housing and Planning department.

In 1952, Duhart received a scholarship at the Institut d'Urbanisme in the Sorbonne University, and during his stay he worked with Le Corbusier in several architectural projects at the Indian cities of Ahmedabad and Chandigarh. Duhart also studied at the Centre Technique du Bâtiment, in Paris.

== Bibliography ==
- Camplá Lehmann, José R. (2013). Modernidad y contextualidad regional: el caso de Emilio Duhart [Modernity and regional contextuality: the Emilio Duhart case]. UPM Digital Archive (phd). E.T.S. Arquitectura (UPM).
- Caralt, David, y Verónica Esparza (2025). Emilio Duhart: escritos, conversaciones y entrevistas 1947-1999. Concepción: Dostercios. ISBN 978-956-420-871-8
- Esparza Saavedra, Verónica (19 de enero de 2016). Emilio Duhart Harosteguy, un arquitecto integral : 1935-1992. Universitat Politècnica de Catalunya.
- Montealegre Klenner, Alberto (1994). Emilio Duhart arquitecto. Santiago: Ediciones ARQ.
