= J. J. P. Oud =

Dutch architect (1890–1963)

Jacobus Johannes Pieter Oud
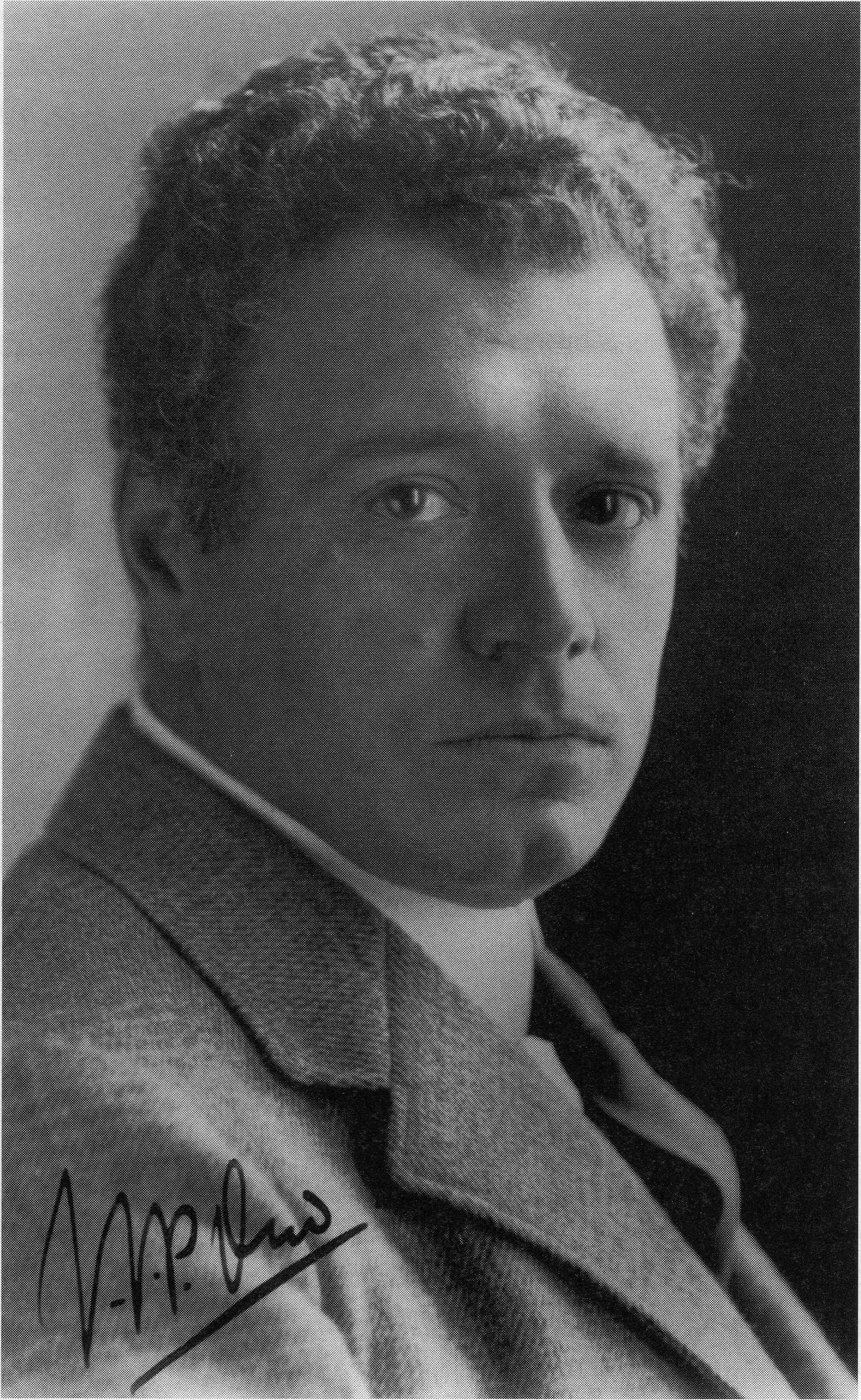
- Born: 9 February 1890; Purmerend, Netherlands
- Died: 5 April 1963 (aged 73); Wassenaar, Netherlands
- Occupation: Architect
- Buildings: Weissenhof Estate; Kiefhoek Housing Development

Jacobus Johannes Pieter Oud (9 February 1890 – 5 April 1963) was a Dutch architect. His fame began as a follower of the De Stijl movement.

== Biography ==
Oud was born in Purmerend, the son of a tobacco and wine merchant. As a young architect, he was influenced by Berlage, and studied under Theodor Fischer in Munich for a time. He worked together with W.M. Dudok in Leiden, which is where he also met Theo van Doesburg and became involved with the movement De Stijl.

Between 1918 and 1933, Oud became Municipal Housing Architect for Rotterdam. During this period when many laborers were coming to the city, he mostly worked on socially progressive residential projects. This included projects in the areas of Spangen, Kiefhoek and the Witte Dorp. Oud was one of a number of Dutch architects who attempted to reconcile strict, rational, 'scientific' cost-effective construction technique against the psychological needs and aesthetic expectations of the users. His own answer was to practice 'poetic functionalism'.

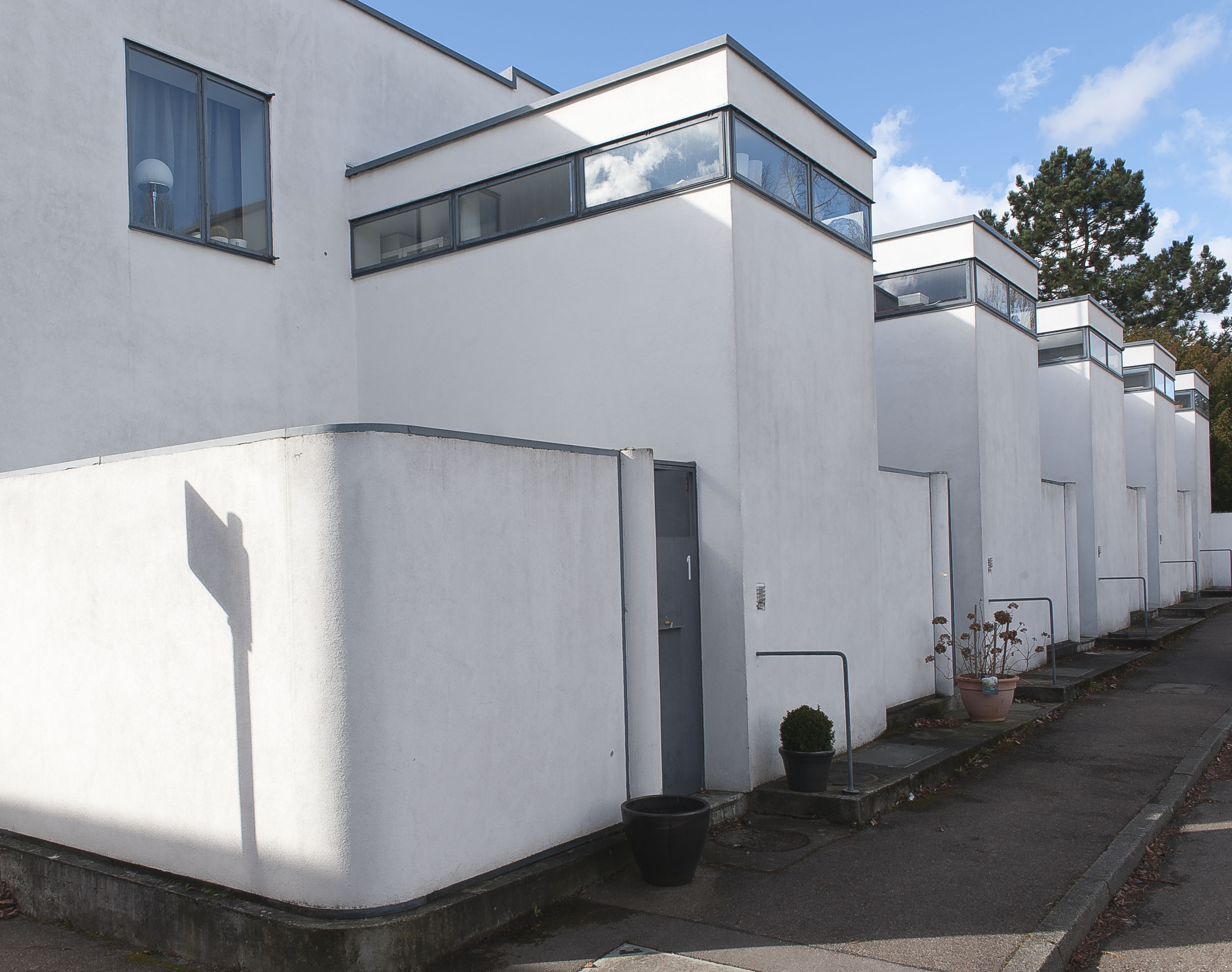
Gallery house at Weissenhof Estate designed by J. Oud

In 1927, he was one of the fifteen architects who contributed to the influential modernist Weissenhof Estate exhibition. In America Oud is perhaps best known for being lauded and adopted by the mainstream modernist movement, then summarily kicked out on stylistic grounds. As of 1932, he was considered one of the four greatest modern architects (along with Ludwig Mies van der Rohe, Walter Gropius and Le Corbusier), and was prominently featured in Philip Johnson's International Style exhibition. Johnson maintained a correspondence with Oud, tried to help him get work, commissioned a house for his mother (never built), and sent him socks and bicycle tires. In 1945, after the end of World War II allowed photographs of Oud's 1941 Shell Headquarters building in The Hague to be published in America, the architectural press sarcastically condemned his use of ornament ("embroidery") as contrary to the spirit of modernism.

After World War II, Oud designed the Dutch National War Monument in Amsterdam and the monument of the Military War Cemetery Grebbeberg. By then, he had mostly let go of any Stijl influences. He continued to take a highly individualistic stance against mainstream modernism. He designed projects such as the Spaarbank in Rotterdam, office-building De Utrecht in Rotterdam and the Children's health-centre in Arnhem (Bio-herstellingsoord).

Oud's brother, Pieter Oud was mayor of Rotterdam.

Oud died in 1963 at the age of 73 in Wassenaar.

== Chronology of works ==
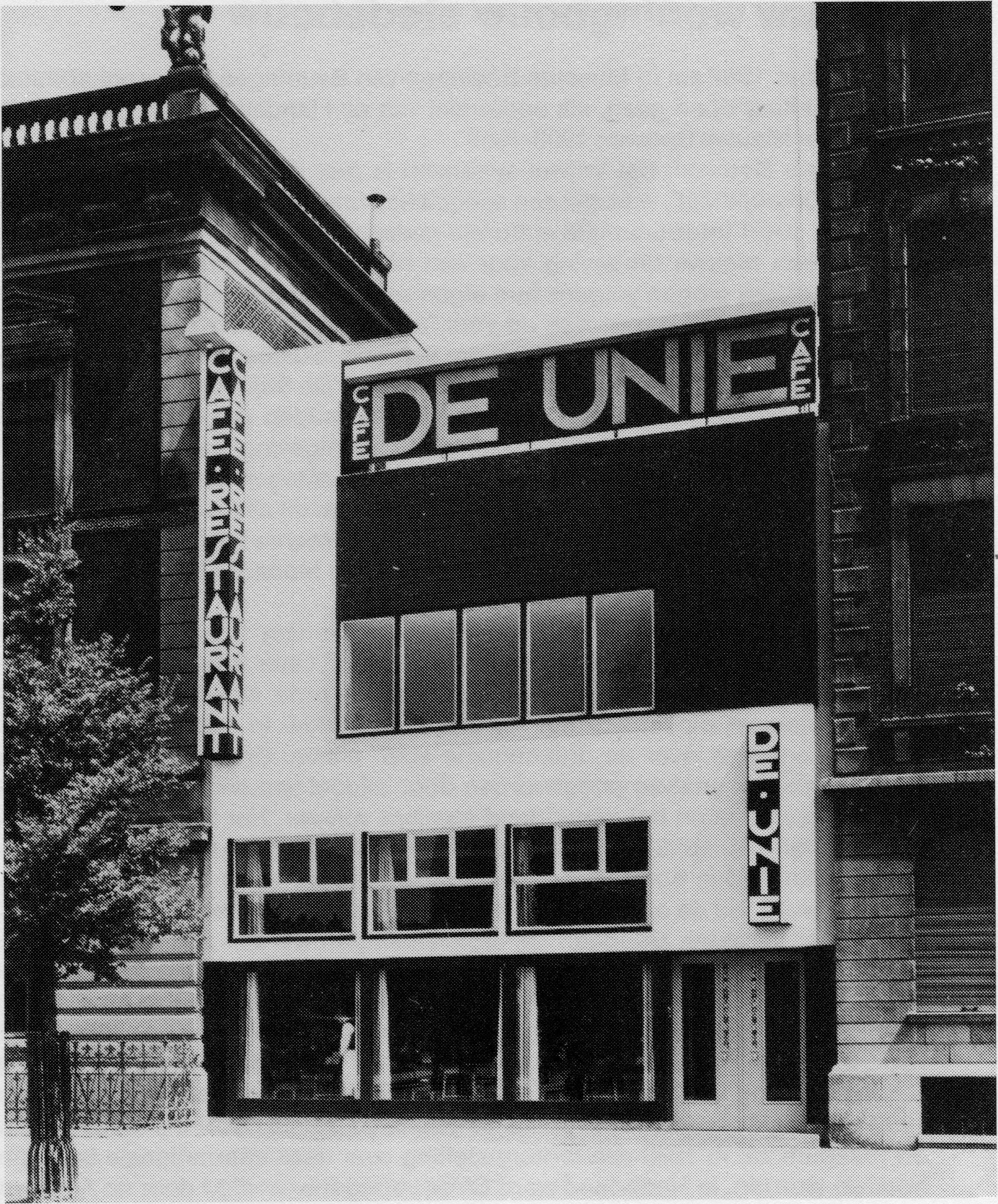
Café de Unie, Rotterdam (1925)

- 1906 House in Purmerend.
- 1912 Movie theatre, block of worker housing and small individual houses in Purmerend.
- 1913–1914 Small houses in and about Leiden.
- 1915 Project for a municipal bath house, unexecuted.
- 1917 House in Katwijk-aan-Zee (collaboration with Kamerlingh Onnes). House in Noordwijkerhout (collaboration with Theo van Doesburg). Project for a row of seaside houses, unexcecuted.
- 1918 Spangen, Blocks I and V, Worker housing in Rotterdam.
- 1919 Spangen, Blocks VIII and IX. Projects for a factory and a bonded Warehouse, unexcecuted.
- 1920–1921 Tuschendijken, Blocks I to IV and VI in Rotterdam.
- 1921 Project for a house in Berlin, unexecuted.
- 1922 Garden Village in Rotterdam at Oud-Mathenesse.
- 1923 Superintendent's office at Oud-Mathenesse, temporary.
- 1925 Café de Unie in Rotterdam
- 1926 Project for Hotel Stiassni in Brno, Czechoslovakia, unexcecuted. Competition project for Rotterdam Exchange, unexcecuted.
- 1926–1927 Worker's Houses at the Hoek of Holland
- 1927 Row of 5 houses, Weissenhof Housing Exposition, Stuttgart.
- 1927 Additions to the villa Allegonda at Katwijk-aan-Zee.
- 1928–1930 Kiefhoek Housing Development in Rotterdam.
- 1931 Project for steel apartments in Rotterdam, unexecuted. Project for house in Pinehurst, unexecuted.
- 1933 Chair, Museum de Fundatie in Heino, Netherlands
- 1938–1948 Shell Headquarters, The Hague
- 1942–1957 Spaarbank, Rotterdam
- 1952–1960 Bio-herstellingsoord, Arnhem
- 1954–1961 Officebuilding De Utrecht, Rotterdam
- 1956, National Monument (with sculptor John Raedecker), Dam Square, Amsterdam
