= Palacio de los Tribunales de Justicia de Santiago =

Coordinates: 33°26′20.93″S 70°39′11.14″W

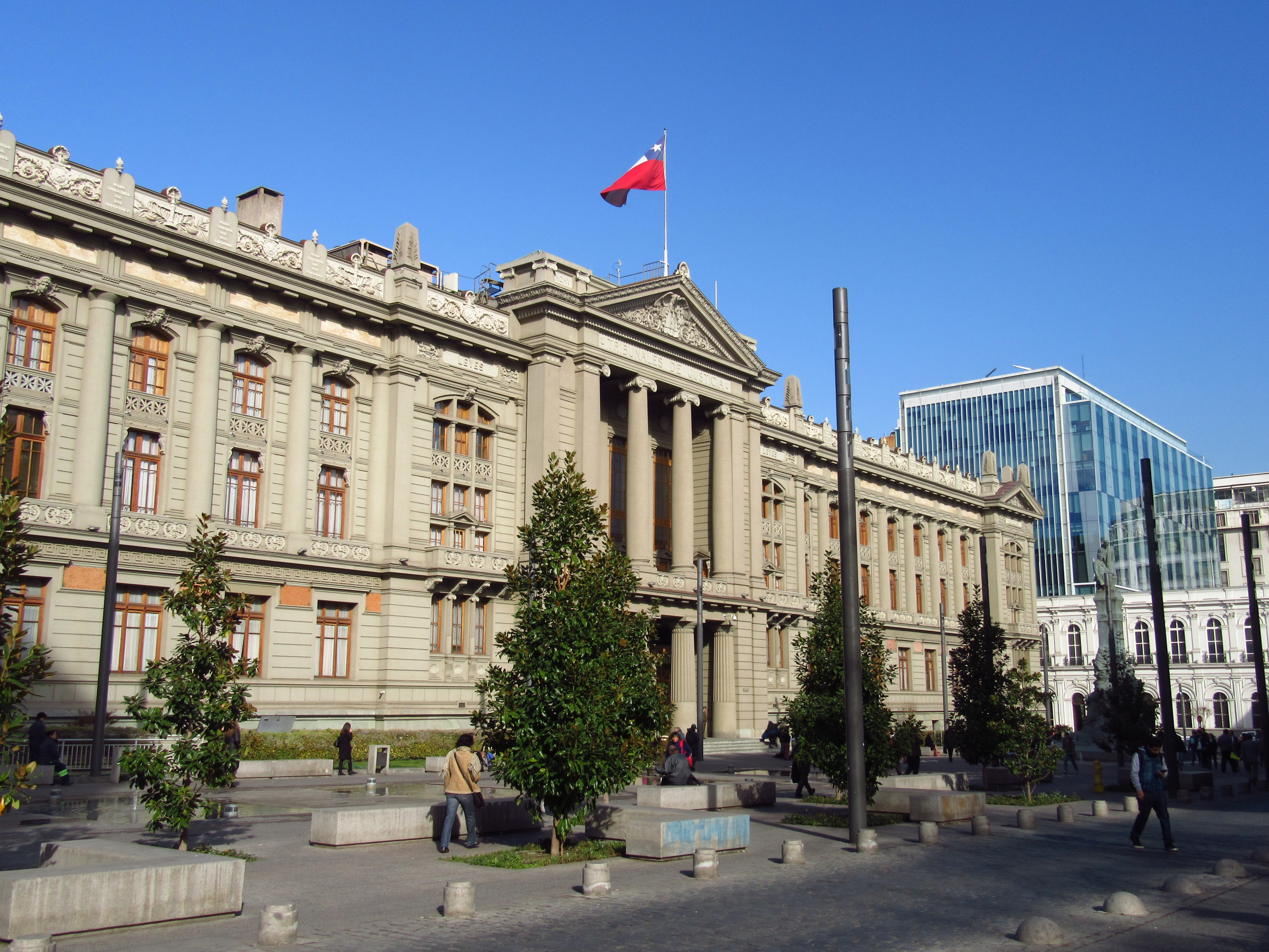
Palacio de los Tribunales de Justicia de Santiago.

The Palacio de los Tribunales de Justicia de Santiago (English: Courts of Justice Palace of Santiago) is the building housing the Supreme Court of Chile, the Court of Appeals of Santiago, and the Court-martial Court of the Chilean Army, Chilean Air Force and Carabineros de Chile. It occupies a full block-front of Compañía Street between Bandera and Morandé Streets. The building diagonally faces the Palacio de la Real Aduana, which houses the Museo Chileno de Arte Precolombino, and Montt Varas Square sits in front.

The building, which is opposite the Ex Congreso Nacional, was built in two phases between 1905 and 1930 in the neoclassical style. The earlier, the western portion of the building, was completed in 1911. The main entrance to the building is framed by a two-tiered portico that is supported by one-story-high Doric columns on the lower level and two-story-high Ionic columns on the upper level. The portico is crowned by a triangular pediment containing the figure of a condor standing on an open book with the word LEX (Latin for law) sculpted over it.

The building has a three-story arcade, which is parallel to the main facade and features a glass skylight. Ornamental details include caryatids holding bronze swords made by the sculptor Coll y Pi and a stained glass window made in Munich, Germany by Franz Mayer & Co.
