= Former National Congress of Chile building =

National monument of Chile

Coordinates: 33°26′16″S 70°39′11″W

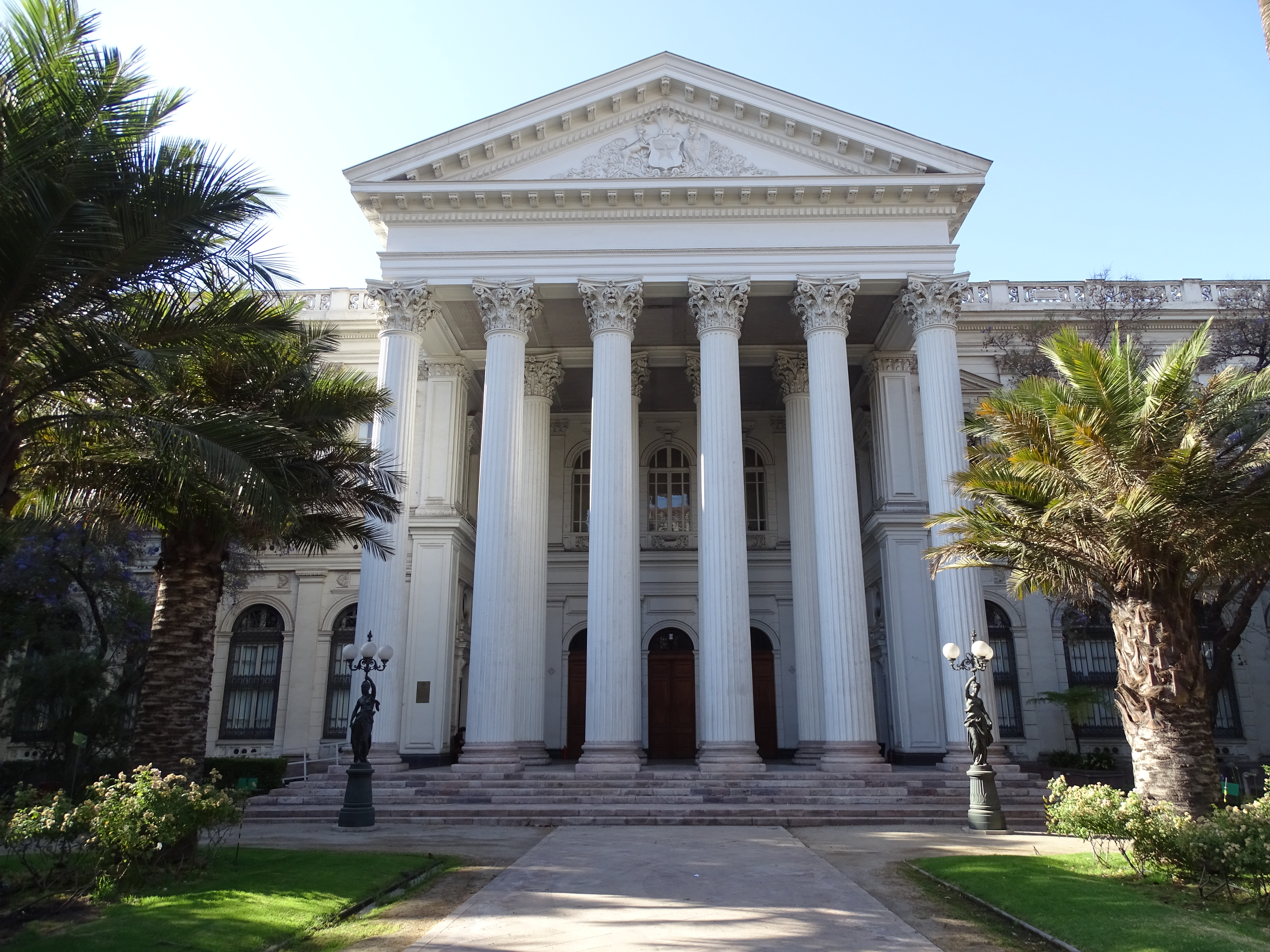
Front of Former National Congress Building, Santiago

The Former National Congress Building (ex Congreso Nacional) is the former home of the Chilean Congress. Congress met in this building in central Santiago until Salvador Allende's socialist government was overthrown by Augusto Pinochet's military coup d'état on September 11, 1973.

== History ==
During the Pinochet dictatorship, Congress was moved to new premises in Valparaíso; the old building was declared a national monument in 1976 and between 1990 and 2006 housed the ministry of foreign affairs. The Senate moved its offices in Santiago to this building in December 2000. On January 26, 2006, the Chamber of Deputies recovered its old offices.

Work began on the original building under President Manuel Montt Torres (1851–1861), but the construction was not completed until 1876, during the presidency of Federico Errázuriz Zañartu. The building was destroyed by fire in 1895, rebuilt, and reopened in 1901, during the Parliamentary Era. It stands on Morandé 441 near the Blvd. Liberador Bernardo O'Higgins, partially surrounded by gardens that contain a variety of exotic trees and plant life. The eastern portion of the gardens was the former site of the Church of the Company.

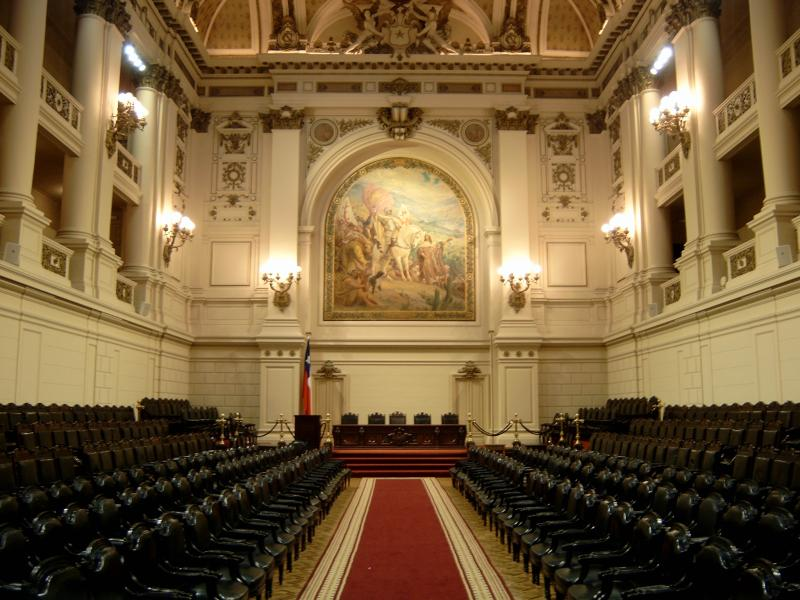
Former Congress Chamber

== Architecture ==
The building has a cross within a square plan, which creates four courtyards. It also features classical pedimented porticos with Corinthian columns on the north and east facades. The building and its gardens occupy a complete city block, which is adjacent to city blocks containing other nationally significant buildings such as the Santiago Metropolitan Cathedral, the Palacio de los Tribunales de Justicia de Santiago and the building that currently houses the Museo Chileno de Arte Precolombino.

The building is open to the public on a limited basis.

== See also ==
- List of Jesuit sites
