= Museo Chileno de Arte Precolombino =

Coordinates: 33°26′20″S 70°39′08″W

Chilean Museum of Pre-Columbian Art
- Museo Chileno de Arte Precolombino

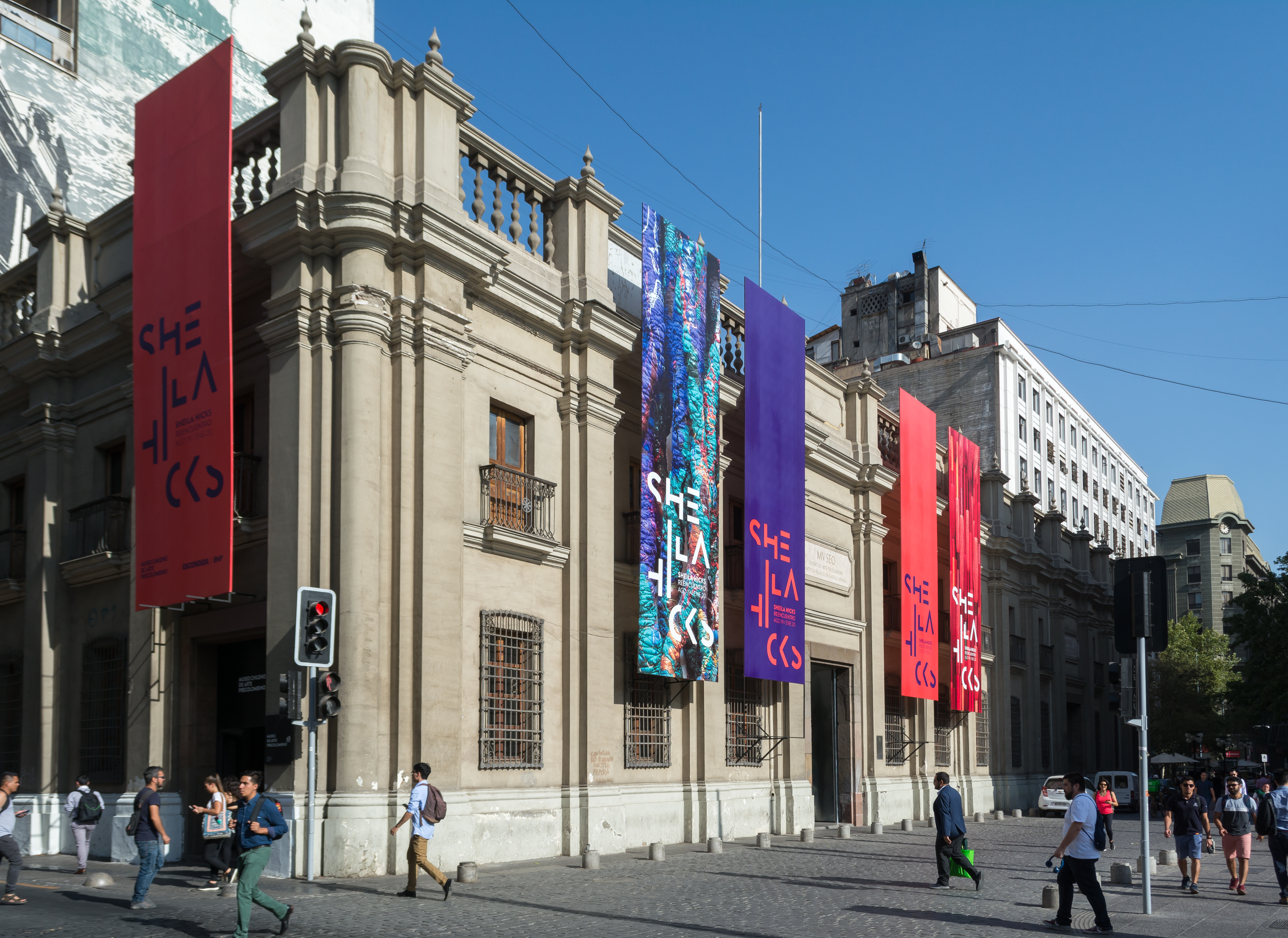
- Facade of the Museum in 2020.
- Established: December 1981
- Location: Bandera 361; Santiago, Chile
- Type: Art museum
- Director: Cecilia Puga
- Curator: José Berenguer Rodríguez
- Public transit access: Metro station: Plaza de Armas
- Website: www.precolombino.cl

The Chilean Museum of Pre-Columbian Art (Spanish: Museo Chileno de Arte Precolombino) is an art museum dedicated to the study and display of pre-Columbian artworks and artifacts from Central and South America.

The museum is located in the city centre of Santiago, the capital of Chile. The museum was founded by the Chilean architect and antiquities collector Sergio Larraín García-Moreno, who had sought premises for the display and preservation of his private collection of pre-Columbian artefacts acquired over the course of nearly fifty years.

With the support of Santiago's municipal government at the time, García-Moreno secured the building and established the museum's curatorial institution. The museum first opened in December 1981.

== Building ==
The museum is housed in the Palacio de la Real Aduana, which was constructed between 1805 and 1807. It is located a block west of the Plaza de Armas and close to the Palacio de los Tribunales de Justicia de Santiago and the Former National Congress Building.

In January 2014, as a result of a partnership with Minera Escondida and BHP Billiton, the museum inaugurated a new phase designed by Chilean architect Smiljan Radić Clarke which involved a 70% expansion of the area, increasing exhibition spaces, storage, and the conservation laboratory.

== Collection ==
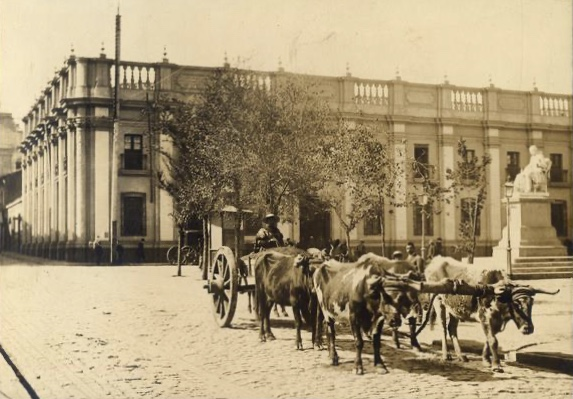
Photo taken in 1900 of the museum's building, the Palacio de la Real Aduana.

Items in the museum's collections are drawn from the major pre-Columbian culture areas of Mesoamerica, Intermediate / Isthmo-Colombian, Pan-Caribbean, Amazonia and the Andean. The museum has over 3,000 pieces representing almost 100 different groups of people. The collection ranges from about 10,000 years. The original collection was acquired based on the aesthetic quality of the objects, instead of their scientific or historical context. The collection is broken up into four areas:

- Area mesoamerica: Includes a statue of Xipe Totec, an incense burner from the Teotihuacan culture, and a Mayan bas-relief.
- Area Intermedia: Showcase pieces include pottery from the Valdivia people, and Capuli figures chewing coca leaf. Gold objects from the Veraguas and Diquis cultures are also represented.
- Area Andes Centrales: Features masks and copper figures, of which many were confiscated from graves. Examples include those from the Moche and textiles. The oldest textile in the museum is in this area, a painted cloth almost 3,000 years old from the Chavín culture.
- Area Andes del Sur: This collection features modern Chilean and Argentinian pieces. Ceramic urns from the Aguada culture, snuff trays from the San Pedro culture, and an Incan quipu.
