= Sergio Larraín García-Moreno =

Chilean architect (1905–1999)

Sergio Larraín
- Born: November 17, 1905; Santiago, Chile
- Died: June 27, 1999; Santiago, Chile
- Education: Pontifical Catholic University
- Espionage activity
- Service branch: Secret Intelligence Service

Sergio Larraín García-Moreno (Santiago, November 17, 1905 — June 27, 1999) was a Chilean architect, founder of the Chilean Museum of Pre-Columbian Art. He is considered among the most important exponents of the generation of architects who traveled to Europe and came into contact with Le Corbusier, the Bauhaus design school and the artistic trends of the modern movement. This experience definitively marked his professional career, which stood out for his innovative and avant-garde nature.

== Biography ==
He studied at the School of Architecture of the Pontifical Catholic University of Chile, from which he graduated in 1928.

The following year, Larraín, together with his colleague Jorge Arteaga, completed the Oberpaur Building, considered the first modern building in Chile. This work was inspired by the Schocken warehouse in Stuttgart, completed by Erich Mendelsohn a year earlier. The Oberpaur influenced, in turn, the building of the National Council of Culture and the Arts—current headquarters in Valparaíso—of the Ministry of Cultures, Arts and Heritage, designed in 1936 by the architect Marcelo Deglin Samson (since its inauguration in 1942 it housed the port's Post Office and Telegraph Office until 2001. Two years later it passed into the hands of the CNCA until this institution became a ministry in 2017).

While he carried out his teaching work at the Catholic University, he was linked to important changes in the School of Architecture, of which he became dean in 1952, a position he held for 15 years. Among his most important achievements are the creation of a visiting professor program and the signing of scholarships for the training of Chilean professors abroad. Under his administration, the purchase of the Casa Lo Contador that houses the Faculty of Architecture was completed. His academic management led to the founding of the Interdisciplinary Center for Urban Development.

In 1972 he obtained the National Architecture Award of Chile and in 1984 he received an honorary doctorate from his alma mater. Scholar and collector of American archaeological pieces, he was founder of the Chilean Museum of Pre-Columbian Art of Santiago in 1981.

In the municipal elections of 1938 he won, supported by the Conservative Party, a councilor seat in the municipality of Santiago, a position he held until 1941.

During World War II he was an agent of the British Intelligence Service in Chile to investigate German activities in the country. He was later decorated by Queen Elizabeth II.

On August 16, 1968, he was appointed Chilean ambassador to Peru by President Eduardo Frei Montalva. He remained in that position until 1971.

Political offices
Preceded by Horacio Walker	Ambassador of Chile to Peru; 1968–1971	Succeeded by Luis Jerez Ramírez
