= Kiefhoek =

Coordinates: 51°53′36″N 4°30′22″E

- Neighborhood of Rotterdam
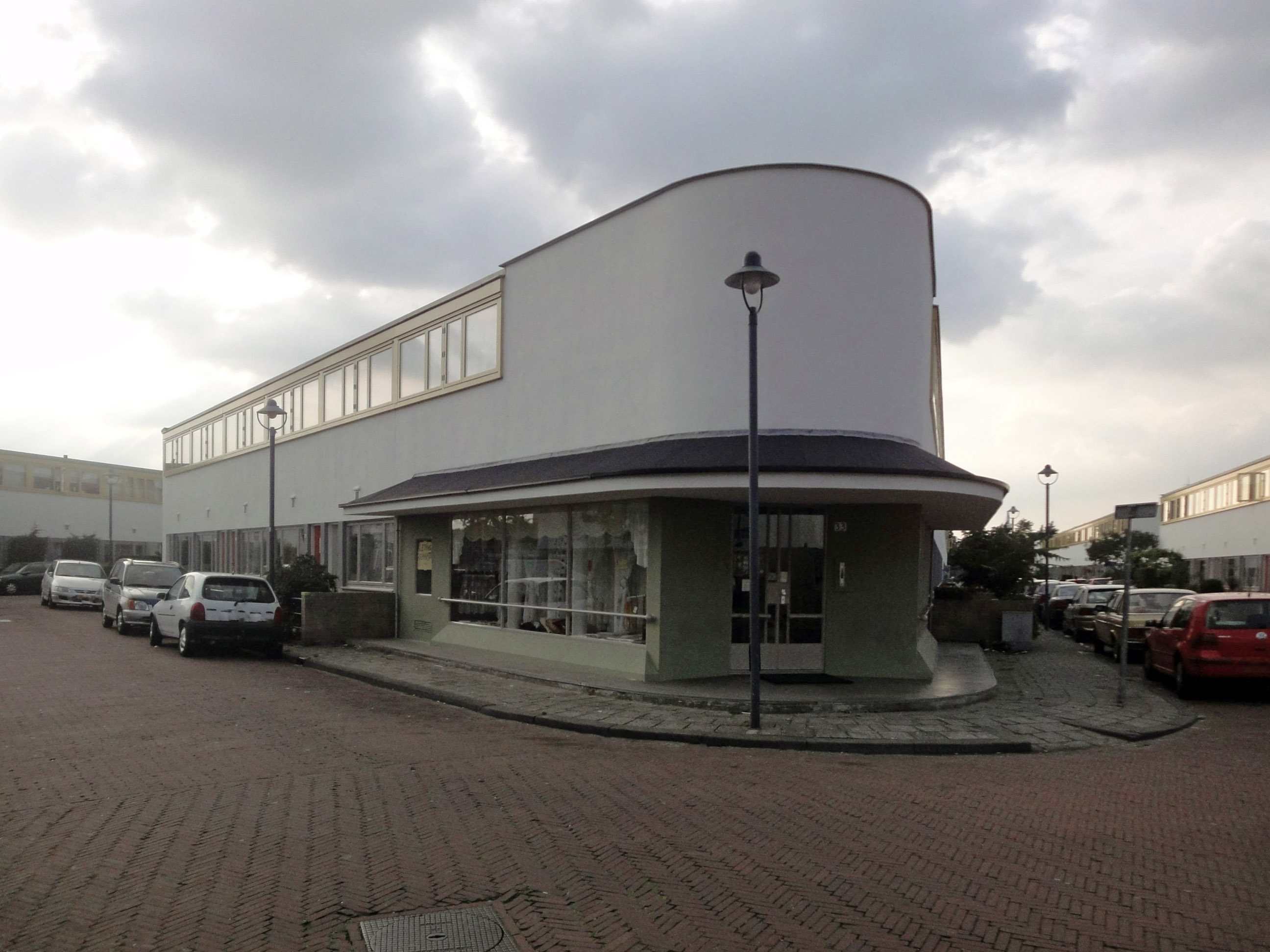
- Kiefhoek complex in Rotterdam
- Interactive map of Kiefhoek
- Country: Netherlands
- Province: South Holland
- COROP: Rotterdam
- Borough: Feijenoord
- Time zone: UTC+1 (CET)

Kiefhoek is a neighborhood of Rotterdam, Netherlands.
