= Ferdinand Kramer =

German architect (1898–1985)

- Born: 22 January 1898
- Died: 4 November 1985 (aged 87)
- Alma mater: Bauhaus
- Occupation: Architect

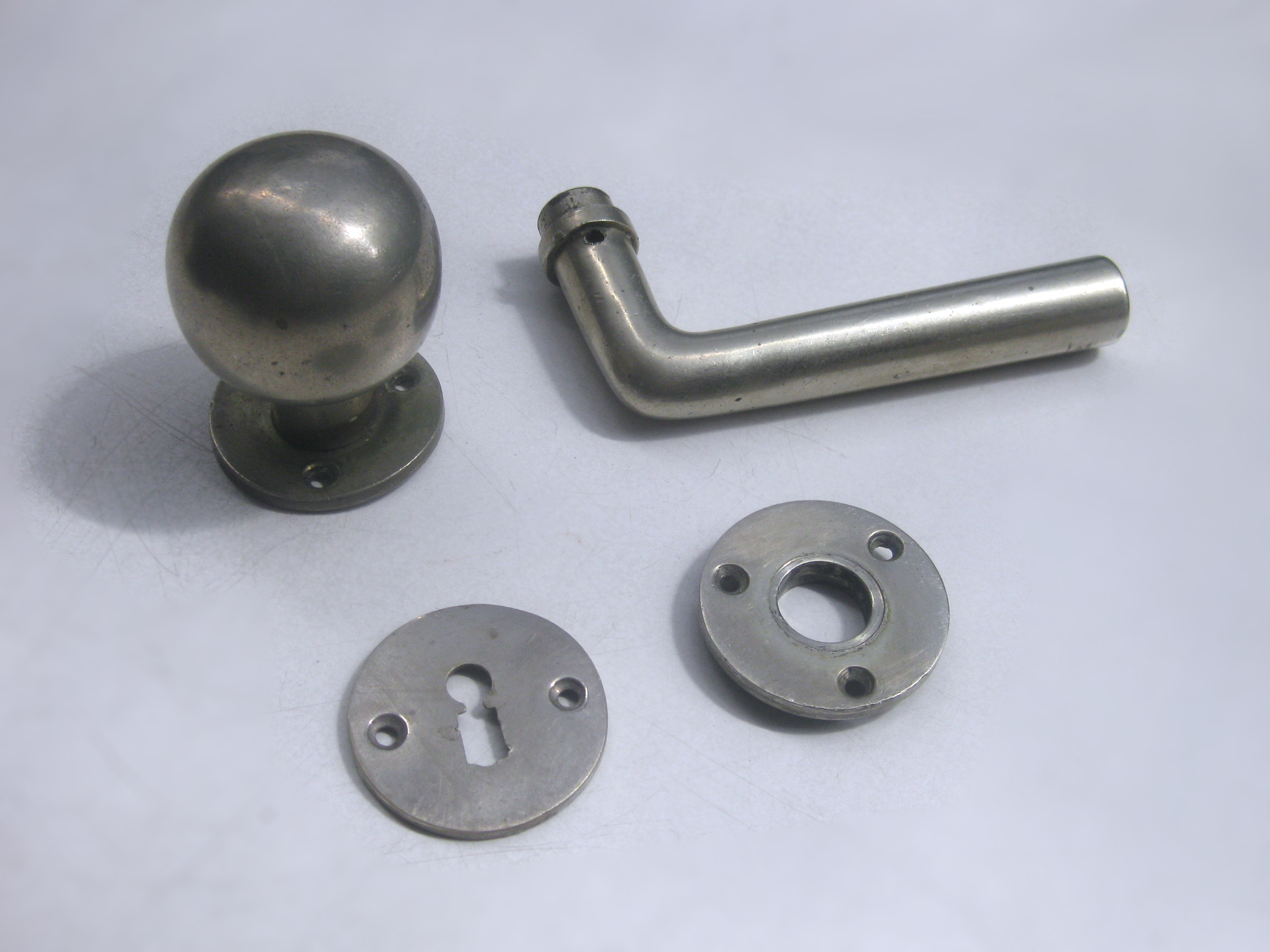
Doorhandle designed in 1925 by Kramer for the New Frankfurt Project

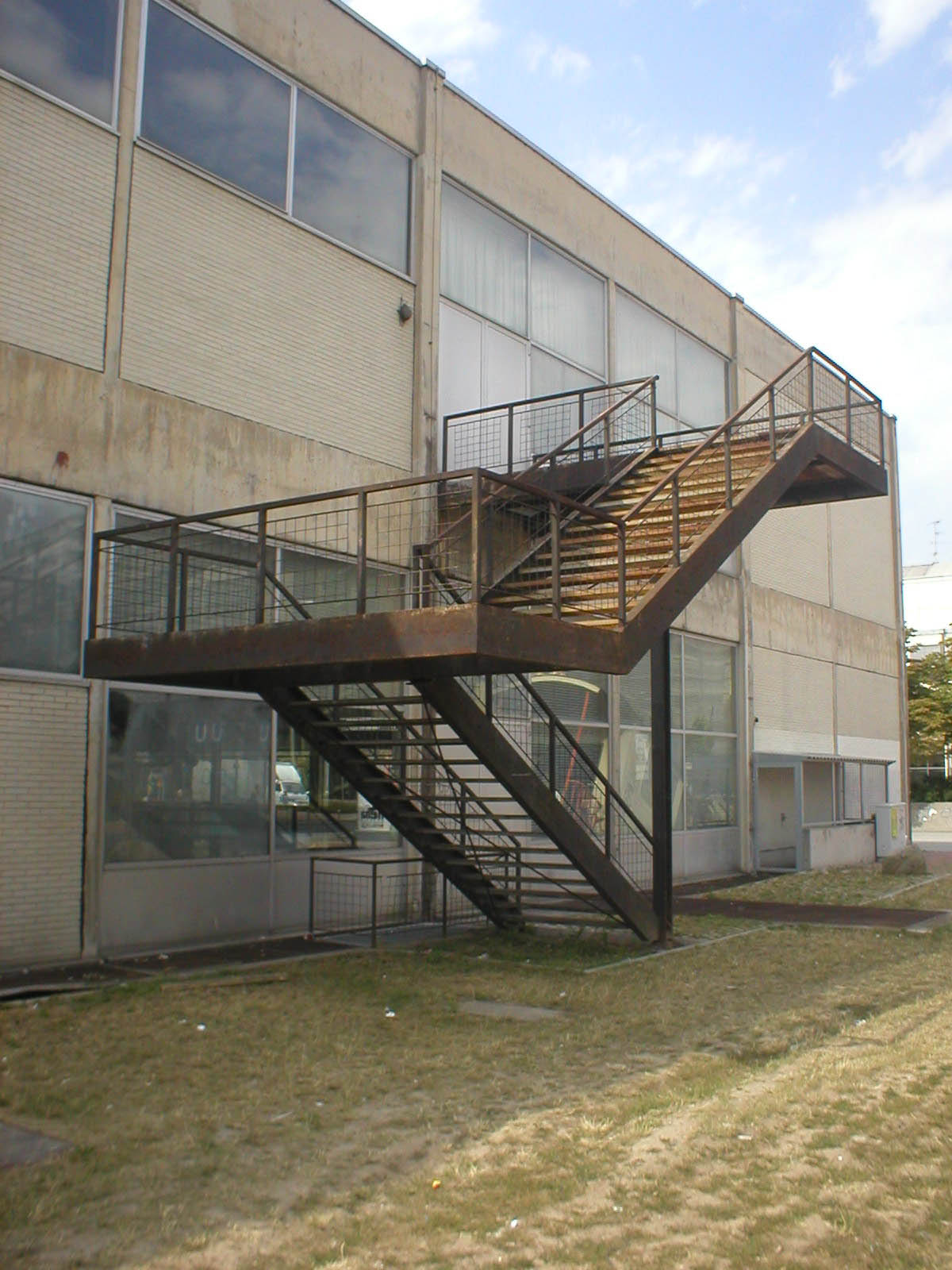
Canteen on Bockenheim Campus

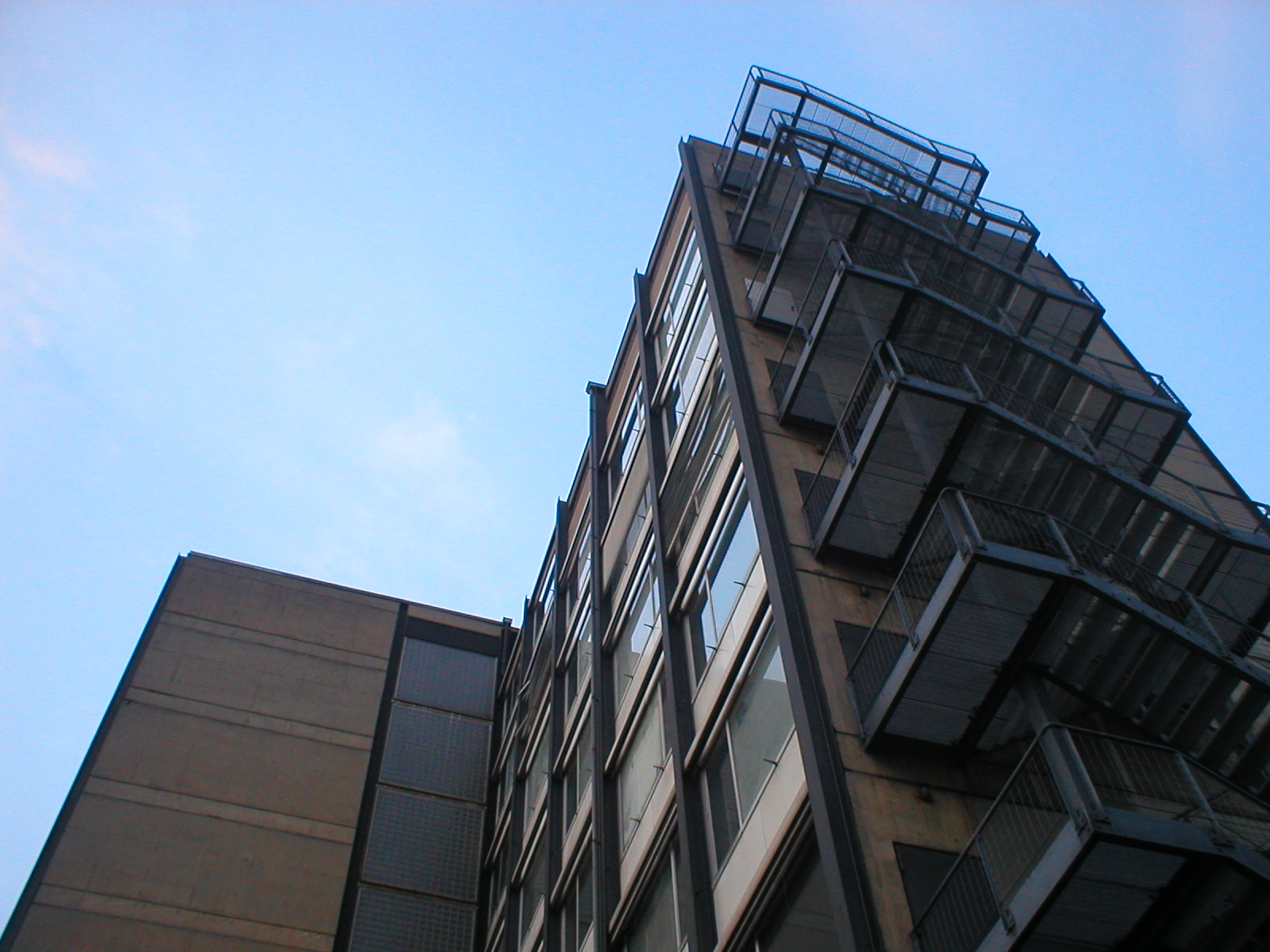
Building on Bockenheim Campus

Ferdinand Kramer (22 January 1898, Frankfurt, Germany – 4 November 1985, Frankfurt) was a German architect and functionalist designer.

== Biography ==
Kramer's father was owner of the most well-known of Frankfurt hat shops. In 1916, immediately after conclusion of school, Kramer was drawn into military service and remained a soldier through the end of the First World War. The following year he trained at the Bauhaus for a few months before quitting, disillusioned with the technical level of the training, then began a three-year architectural study in Munich with Theodor Fischer. Kramer returned to Frankfurt in 1922. With the lack of architectural commissions during this period of inflation, he concentrated on furniture designs for Thonet and metal utensils, for example his "Kramer Oven", a sheet-metal furnace.

From 1925 through 1930, Kramer worked for architect and civic planner Ernst May building and furnishing the housing projects of New Frankfurt, and was a contributor to the second CIAM conference. After disputes with the Nazi regime and professional disqualification, Kramer emigrated to the United States in 1938 and worked on a variety of projects, including work with Norman bel Geddes on designs for the New York World's Fair of 1939, designs for inexpensive "knock-down" furniture which anticipate today's commercial "flat-pack" furniture, and commissions from his friend Theodor Adorno for the Institute for Social Research during its New York years. Kramer became a naturalized US citizen in 1945.

On his return to Germany in 1952, Kramer taught and served as the director of building at the Goethe University Frankfurt until his retirement into private practice in 1964. Paul Friedrich Posenenske followed the architectural language introduced by Ferdinand Kramer at the university buildings. The university moves step by step to the new Poelzig/Westend and Nieder-Eschbach campuses, so many of the old buildings in Bockenheim will be sold or even torn down although they are landmark buildings.

Ferdinand Kramer was married to Beate Kramers and later to Lore Kramer, who still cares for his legacy. They have three daughters.

== Legacy ==
From 9 December 1982, to 23 January 1983, a retrospective of Kramer's work was shown at Bauhaus Archive in Berlin, and at Amerikahaus in Frankfurt. From 5 June to 4 August 1991, the Museum of Design, Zürich put on the retrospective exhibition "Ferdinand Kramer – Der Charme des Systematischen" which was also shown in Frankfurt at the Deutscher Werkbund (in cooperation with the DAM, Deutsches Architekturmuseum) and later at the Bauhaus Dessau. The Frankfurt University archive keeps examples of furniture Kramer designed specifically for the university. Other museums such as the Museum für Angewandte Kunst, Frankfurt, the Thonet Museum in Frankenberg as well as the Vitra Design Museum, in Weil am Rhein, the Victoria and Albert Museum in London, the Museum für Gestaltung in Zurich, have examples of Kramer's furniture.

Kramer's door handle design and designs for several pieces of furniture have been re-released.

== See also ==
- Frankfurt University Library
