= Munich kitchen =

1920s fitted kitchen concept

The Munich kitchen (German: Münchener Küche) is a 1920s kitchen designed by the home economist Erna Meyer and the architects Hanna Löw and Walther Schmidt. It was designed for the municipal dwellings of the Bavarian Post Office and first presented at the Heim und Technik exhibition in Munich in 1928.

The Munich Kitchen was developed in response to widespread criticism of earlier models such as the Frankfurt and Stuttgart kitchens, which did not allow for children to be minded while cooking. Designed with user comfort and family dynamics in mind, it featured a much-reduced square layout of 6 square metres (65 sq ft) for cooking, separated from the living space by a glass wall. This transparent partition allowed mothers to keep an eye on their children in the adjacent room while blocking the spread of odors. Compared to the narrow rectangular form of the Frankfurt kitchen, the square configuration was seen as an improvement. All components were arranged as a single unit along one wall. It also introduced adjustable shelving inside cabinets and a freestanding sink that enabled seated work.

Unlike the enclosed layout of the Frankfurt kitchen or the Stuttgart model's serving hatch, the Munich design used a movable glass wall to connect the kitchen and living area. This allowed for a clear view between the two spaces—enabling the person cooking to keep an eye on children in the dining room, while making kitchen activities visible from the adjoining space. Although the Munich kitchen reflected a conceptual shift, incorporating features closer to a traditional live-in kitchen, it still belonged to the lineage of functionalist modernist kitchens. Like its predecessors, it was shaped by the same core principles of efficiency and rationalization. What distinguished it was its effort to present these ideas in a more accessible, softened form—a "light version" of the functional work kitchen, intended to appeal to a wider audience.
