= Frankfurt kitchen =

Early fitted kitchen concept, 1926

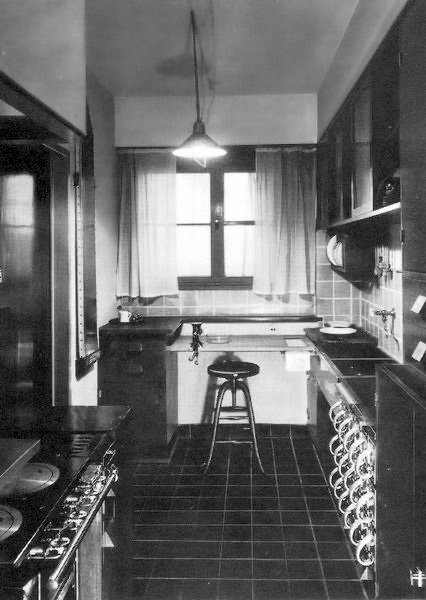
The Frankfurt kitchen (view from the entrance)

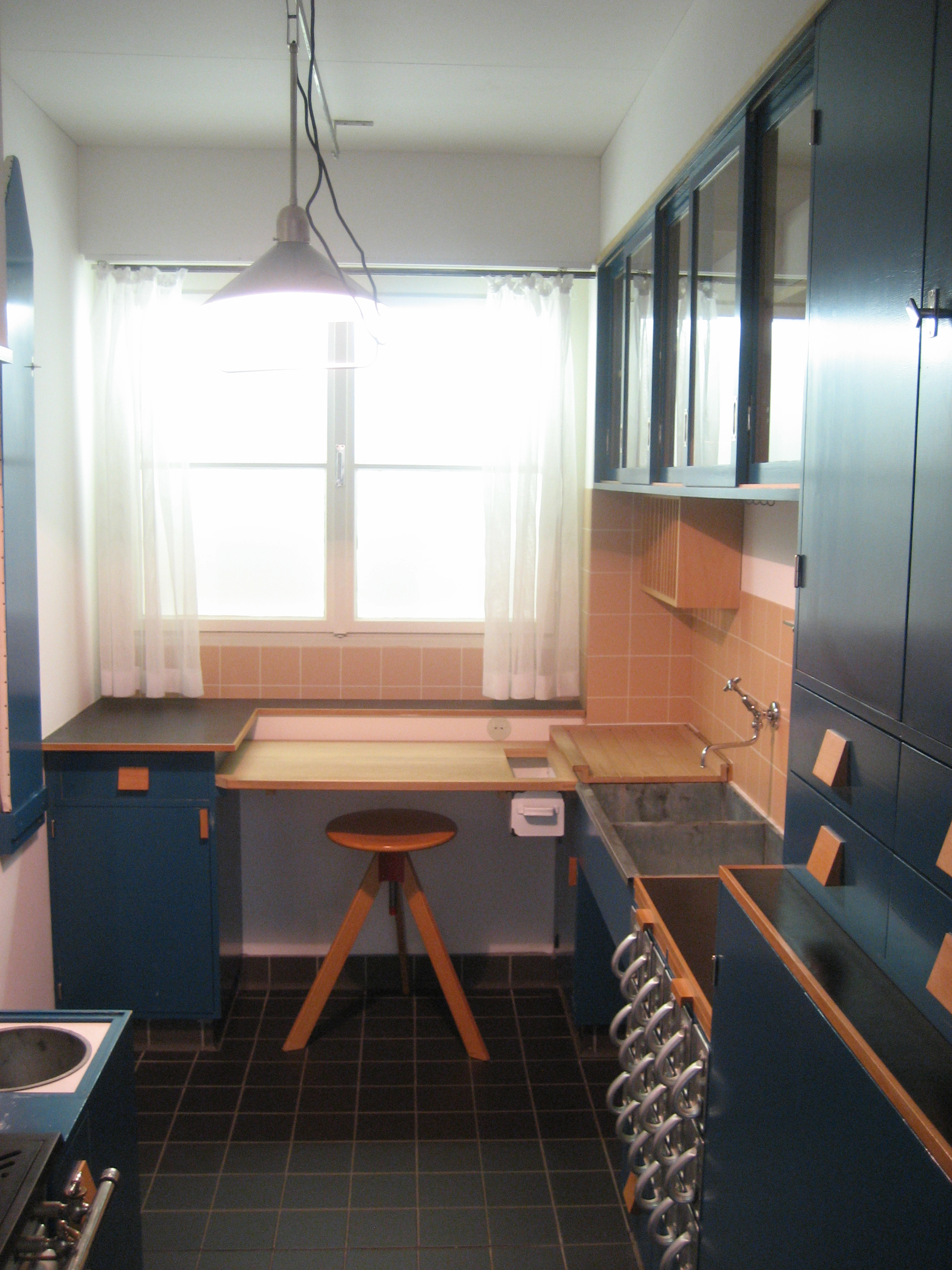
The reconstruction shown at MAK Vienna

The Frankfurt kitchen (German: Frankfurter Küche) is a compact, standardized, built‑in kitchen designed in 1926 by Austrian architect Margarete Schütte-Lihotzky for New Frankfurt, Ernst May's social housing project. It is considered an important point in domestic architecture and the forerunner of modern fitted kitchens. It was the first kitchen in history built after a unified concept: low-cost design that would enable efficient work.

Some 10,000 units were built in the late 1920s in Frankfurt, Germany. In 1930, the USSR government asked May to lead a "building brigade" and implement the Frankfurt model when planning new industrial towns in the Soviet Union.

== Motivation and influences ==
Margarete Schütte-Lihotzky, alongside Bruno Taut and Ernst May, was among the leading housing development architects during the Weimar Republic. The housing designed by these German- speaking architects attracted the labels Neues Bauen (New Building), Neues Wohnen (New Living Style), and Neues Frankfurt (New Frankfurt). In the late 1920s, Neues Bauen became a forerunner for a progressive German architecture.

The Neues Bauen architects were motivated by the desire to build healthy human settlements with access to clean air and light. Purely decorative architecture was rejected and the technology used to build industrial buildings was deployed for the construction of housing estates. The kitchen design of Schütte-Lihotzky was first installed in housing estates that were built in Frankfurt between 1926 and 1932. The Frankfurt kitchen was part of a new layout for apartments with gas stoves and central heating.

The small kitchen of the Bauhaus-designed Haus am Horn, built 1923, with specific storage and drawers for specific items, was also a source of inspiration for Schütte-Lihotzky.

== Influence on built-in kitchen design ==
Margarete Schütte-Lihotzky continued to design kitchens. Her mid-20th century designs incorporated electrical appliances while continuing to rely on methods for efficiency advanced by Frederick Winslow Taylor and Christine Frederick.

To this day in Germany, Schütte-Lihotzky's elaborate kitchen unit workplaces have remained the model for built-in kitchens in public housing.

== Kitchen plan ==
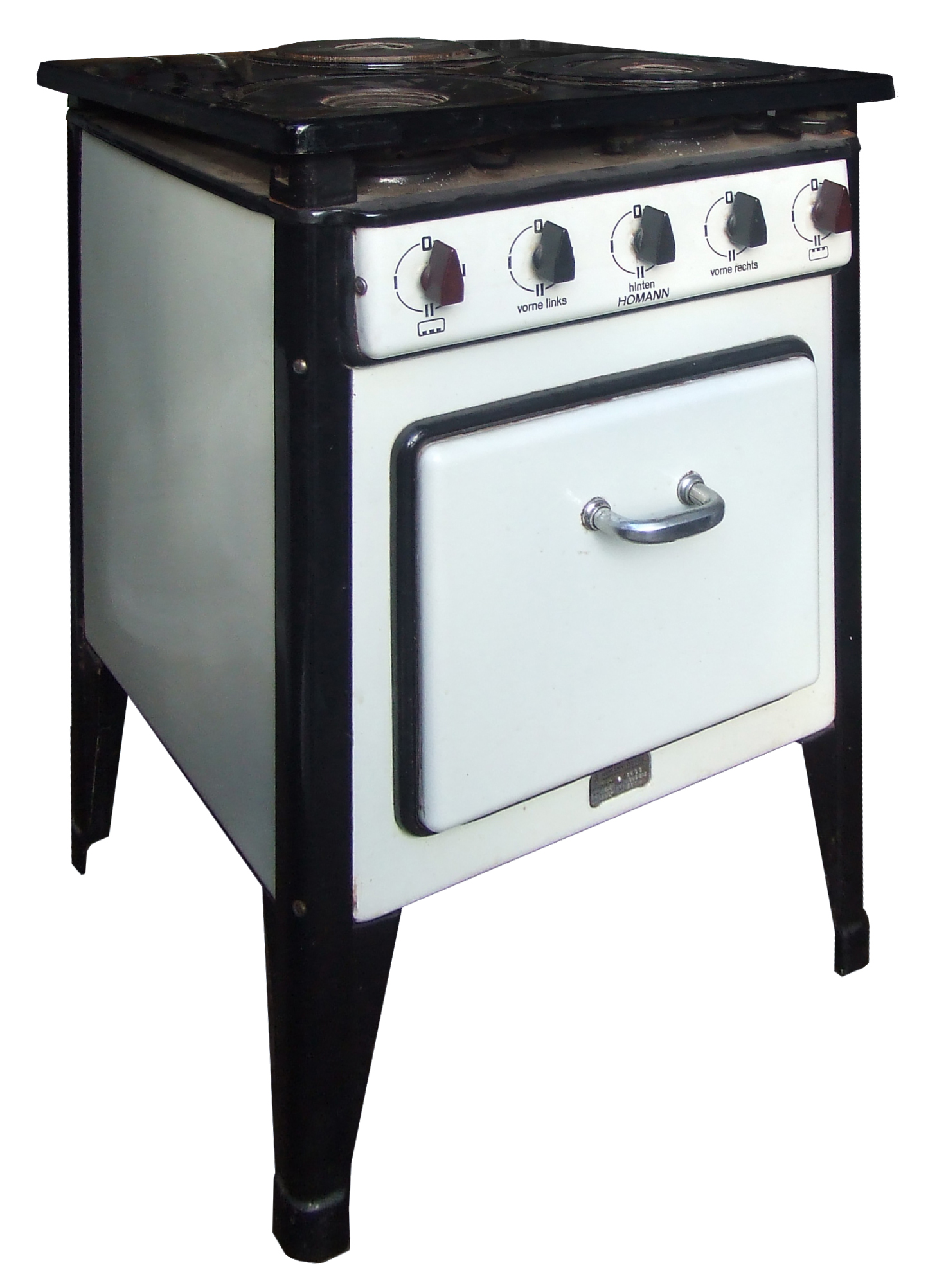
The electric stove.

The Frankfurt kitchen was a narrow double-file kitchen measuring 1.9 m × 3.4 m (6.2 ft × 11.2 ft). The entrance was located in one of the short walls, opposite which was the window. Along the left side, the stove was placed, followed by a sliding door connecting the kitchen to the dining and living room. On the right wall were cabinets and the sink, in front of the window a workspace. There was no refrigerator, but a foldable ironing board is visible in the image folded against the left wall.

The narrow layout of the kitchen was not due solely to the space constraints mentioned above. It was equally a conscious design decision in a Taylorist attempt to reduce the number of steps needed when working in the kitchen as well as reduce the walking distance between the kitchen and the table in the adjacent room via the addition of a sliding door.

Dedicated storage bins for common ingredients such as flour, sugar, rice and others were intended to keep the kitchen tidy and well-organized; the workspace even had an integrated, removable "waste drawer" such that scraps could just be shoved into it while working and the whole thing emptied at once afterwards.

Because conventional kitchen furniture of the time fit neither the new workflows nor the narrow space, the Frankfurt kitchen was installed complete with furniture and major appliances such as the stove, a novelty at that time in Germany. It was the first fitted kitchen. The wooden door and drawer fronts were painted blue because researchers had found that flies avoided blue surfaces. Lihotzky used oak wood for flour containers, because it repelled mealworms, and beech for table tops because beech is resistant to staining, acids, and scratching. The seating was a revolving stool on casters for maximum flexibility.

There are three different variations of the Frankfurt kitchen. Type 1 was adaptable to both the future users' needs and different room shapes.

== User acceptance and influences ==
Schütte-Lihotzky's Frankfurt kitchen was installed in some 10,000 units in Frankfurt and as such was a commercial success. The cost of a single kitchen, fully equipped, was moderate (a few hundred Reichsmarks); the costs were passed on to the rent (which reportedly increased the rents by 1 ℛ︁ℳ︁ per month).

However, the users of these kitchens often had difficulties with them. Unaccustomed to Schütte-Lihotzky's custom-designed workflow-centered kitchens, they often were at a loss as to how to use the kitchen. It was frequently described as not flexible enough— the dedicated storage bins often were used for other things than their labels said. Another problem with these bins was that they were easily reachable by small children. Schütte-Lihotzky had designed the kitchen for one adult person only; children or even a second adult had not entered the picture. In fact, the kitchen was too small for two people to work in. Most contemporary criticism concentrated on such rather technical aspects. Nevertheless, the Frankfurt kitchen subsequently became a model for a modern work kitchen. For the rest of the 20th century, the compact yet rationalized "Frankfurt kitchen" became the standard of tenement buildings throughout Europe.

In the 1970s and 1980s, feminist criticism found that the emancipatory intentions that had in part motivated the development of the work kitchen had actually backfired: precisely because of the design's "specialized rationalization" and its small size that allows only one person to work in them comfortably, housewives tended to become isolated from the life in the rest of the home. What had started as an emancipatory attempt by all proponents (such as Beecher, Frederick, or Meyer, who had always implicitly assumed that the kitchen was the woman's domain) to optimize and revalue work in the home was now seen as a confinement of the woman to the kitchen.

Kitchens from the 1930s until the 1960s in Germany were often smaller and less comfortable than later. Housing societies thought that the Frankfurt kitchen was too luxurious.

But the principles of this kitchen were adapted in other countries such as Sweden and Switzerland and reimported to Germany, where they were recognized to be the same as the earlier Frankfurt kitchen. The major difference of most of the later kitchens was that the Frankfurt kitchen had used relatively expensive wood materials and not particle boards.

== Preserved historic Frankfurt kitchens ==
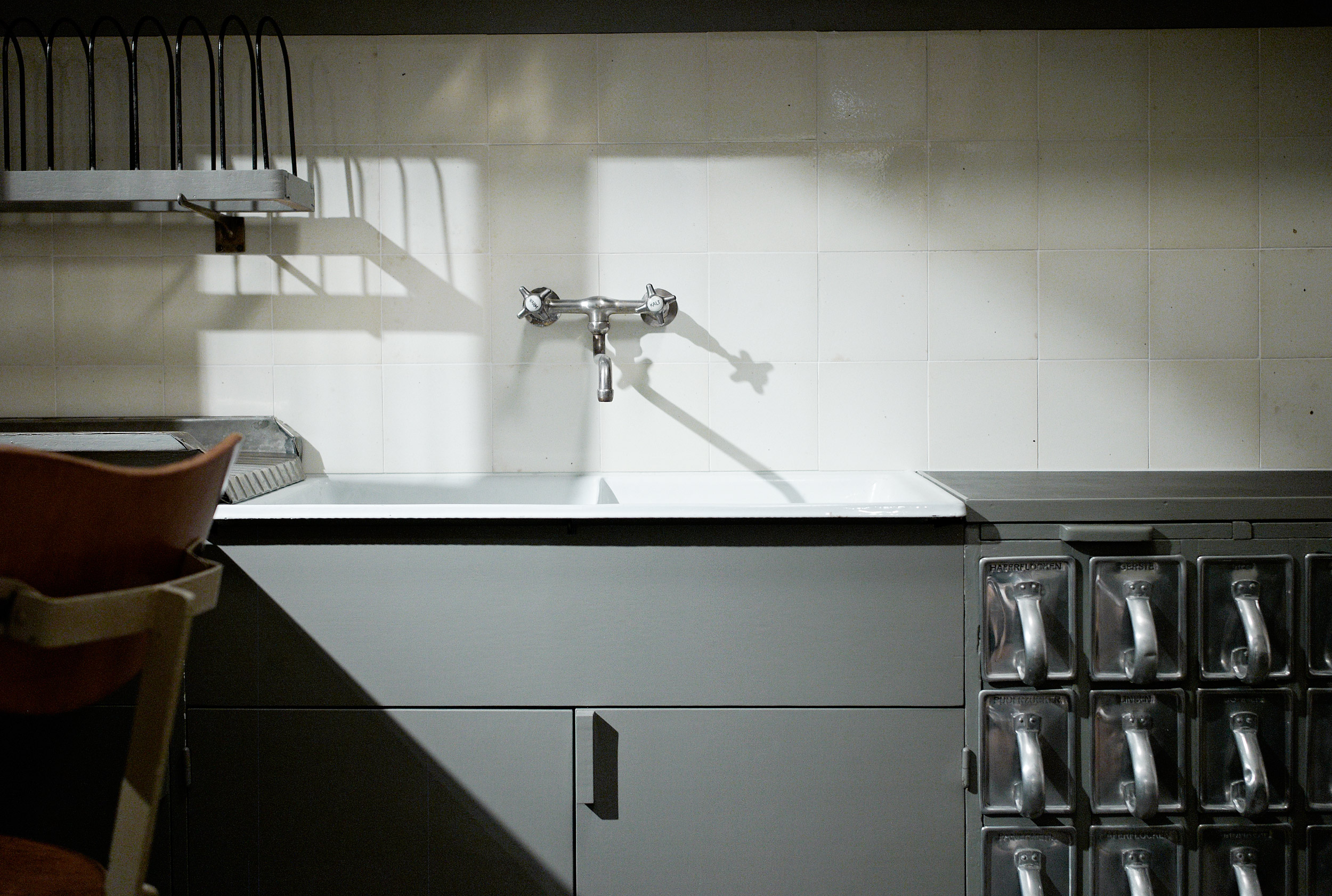
As seen at the MOMA, New York (2010).

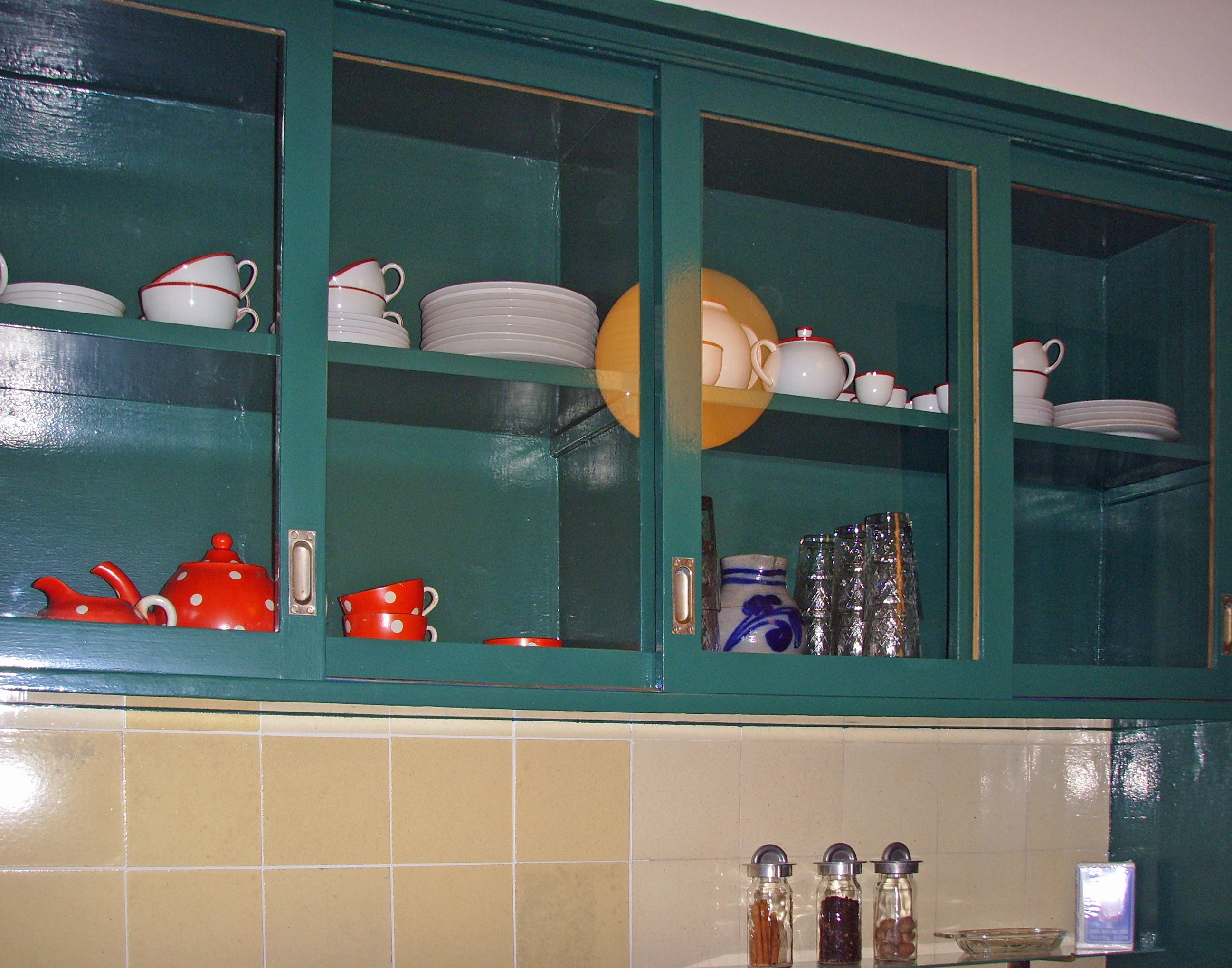
The cupboard of the surviving and refurbished kitchen in the house Im Burgfeld 136.

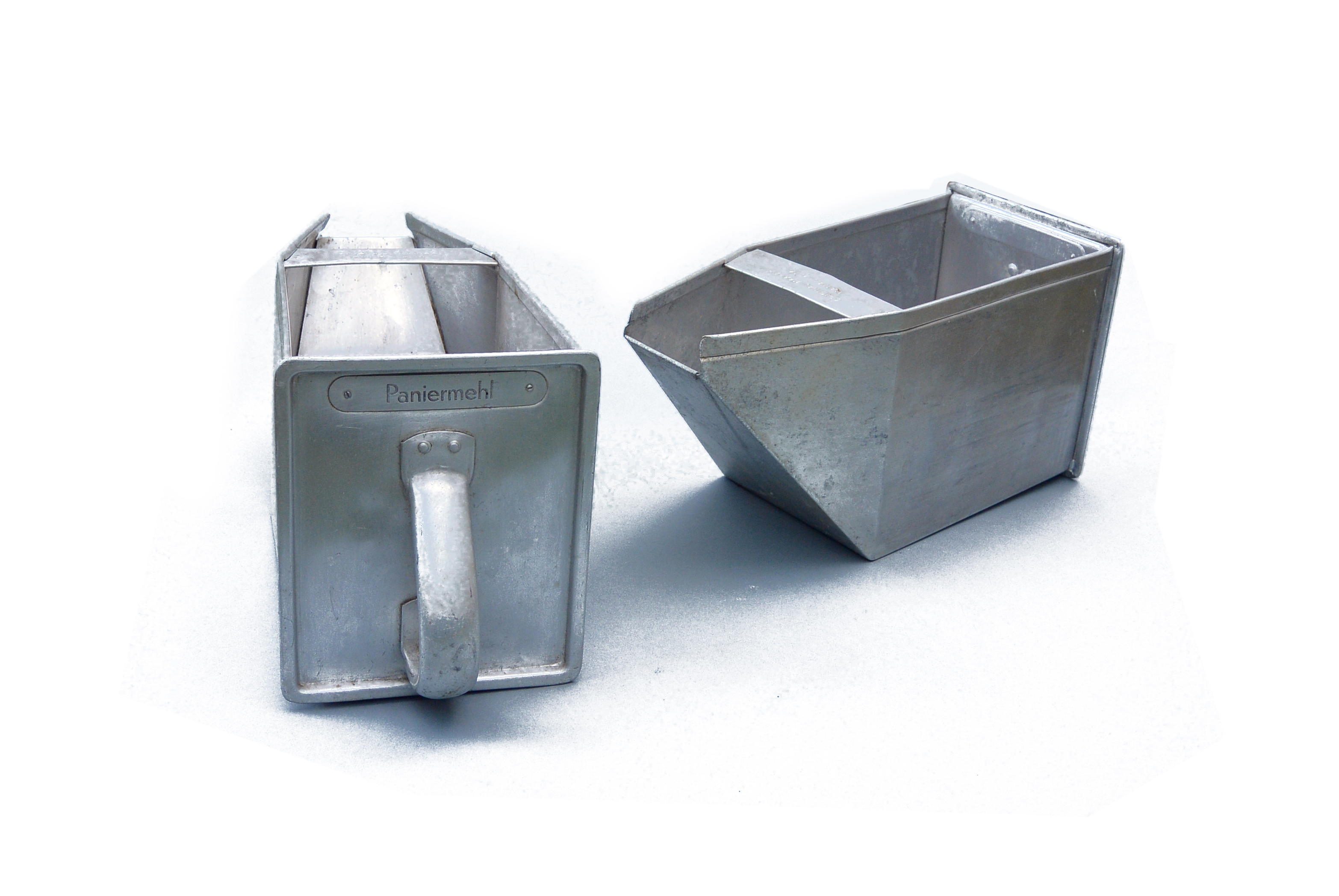
The Frankfurt kitchen's characteristic aluminium drawers.

Most Frankfurt kitchens were disposed of in the 1960s and 1970s, when modern kitchens with easy to clean surfaces like Resopal became affordable. Often, only the aluminium drawers, which are themselves atypical of a modern kitchen, survived. They were also sold separately for a few years by Haarer, the manufacturing company and chosen by architects and cabinet makers for their furniture.

By the late 1990s, when public interest in the work of Margarete Schütte-Lihotzky was revived, most Frankfurt kitchens did not exist anymore. Some homeowners have built replicas; a few originals still survive. The original house Im Burgfeld 136, Frankfurt was chosen to be a museum because of the surviving Frankfurt kitchen.

In 2005 the Victoria and Albert Museum acquired a "Frankfurt" kitchen for its traveling exhibition "Modernism: Designing a New World", which had stops in London, the US and Germany. The kitchen was dismantled from its original place, restored and repainted.

=== Kitchens on auctions ===
One kitchen was sold in 2005 for €22,680, another for €34,200. But these prices seem to apply only for the classic type: a white variation without the characteristic wall cupboard was sold for €11,000.

Auctions sometimes feature the original drawers. In 2010, a piece of furniture with six drawers was sold for €380, another with ten for €1,000, and another with nine for €1,200.

=== The Frankfurt kitchen in museums ===
The Frankfurt kitchen is found in the following public collections:

- Historical Museum, Frankfurt
- Museum der Dinge, Berlin
- Museum für Kunst und Gewerbe Hamburg
- Germanisches Nationalmuseum, Nuremberg
- University of Wuppertal Design collection, Wuppertal
- Badisches Landesmuseum Karlsruhe, Karlsruhe
- Museum of Applied Arts (MAK), Vienna (Reconstruction)
- Minneapolis Institute of Arts, Minneapolis, Minnesota
- Museum of Modern Art, New York
- Victoria and Albert Museum, London
- Design Museum Denmark, Copenhagen
- Max Liebling House, Tel Aviv

== See also ==
- Stuttgart kitchen – 1920s kitchen model
- Munich kitchen – 1920s fitted kitchen concept
