= Stuttgart kitchen =

1920s kitchen model

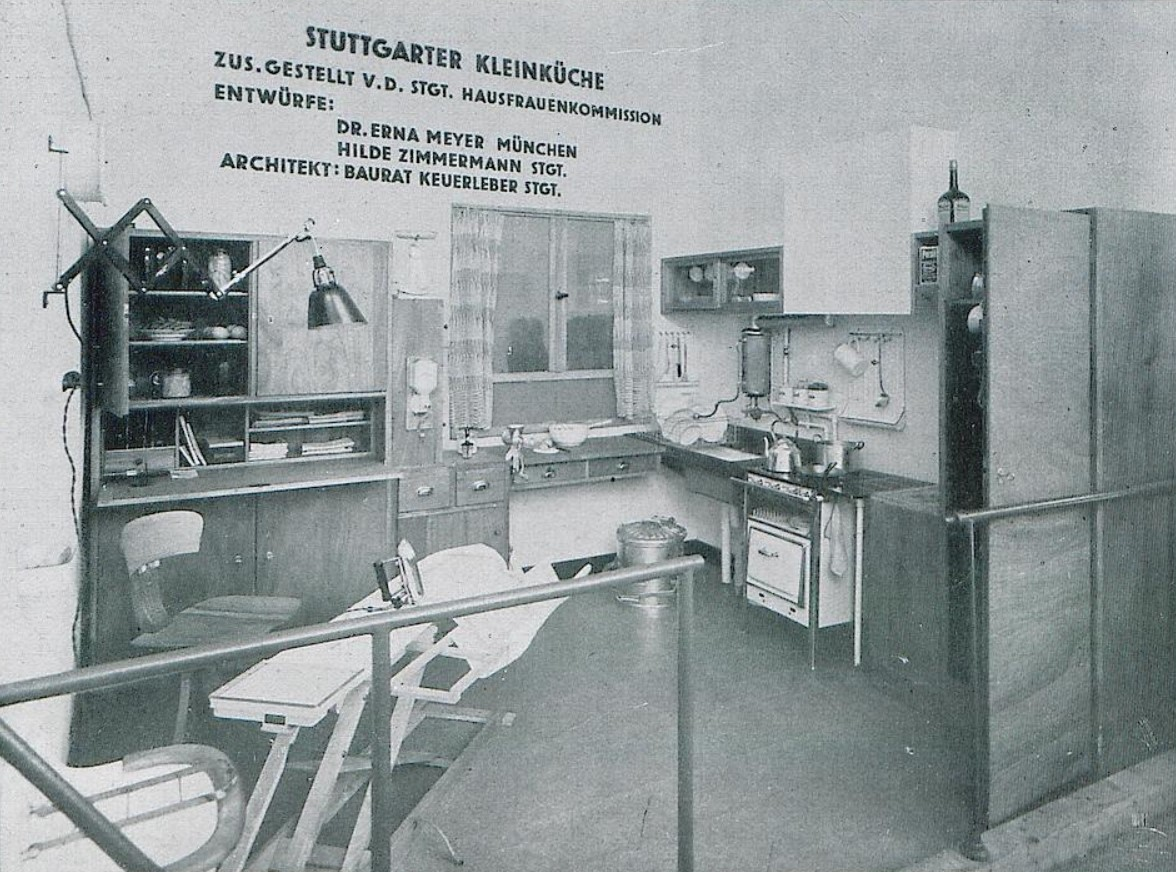
Stuttgart small kitchen

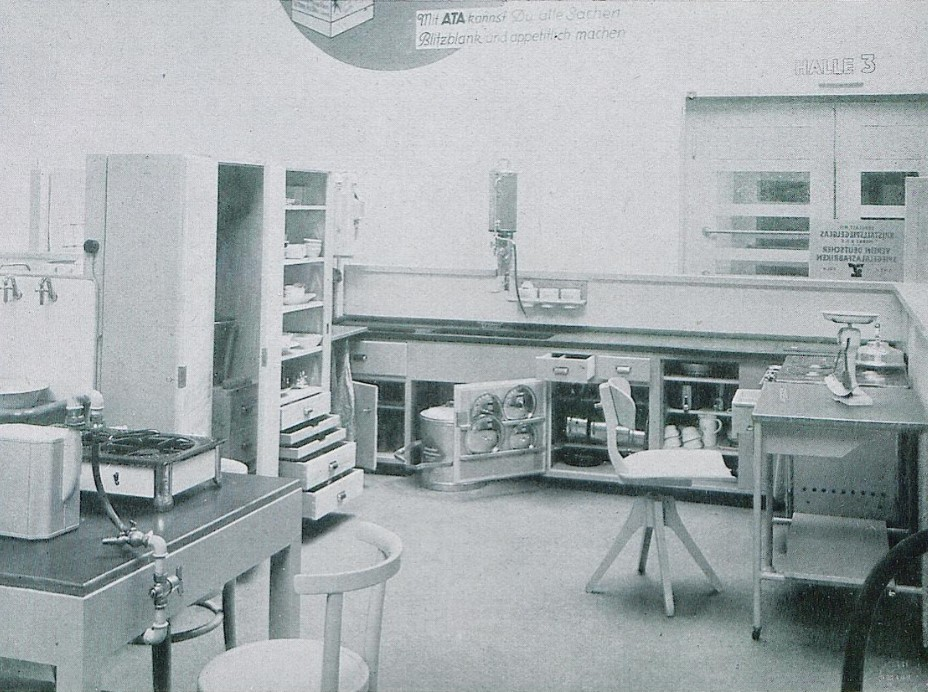
Stuttgart teaching kitchen

The Stuttgart kitchen (German: Stuttgarter Küche) is a 1920s kitchen consisting of a small set of movable, basic furniture elements that could be combined into various cabinet configurations, allowing buyers to assemble them in-store according to their individual needs. It was designed by German home economist Erna Meyer and Hilde Zimmermann.

Four types of Stuttgart kitchens were shown in 1927 at the Deutscher Werkbund exhibition at the Weissenhof Estate. Three of these—the "Stuttgart kitchen", the "Stuttgart small kitchen" (Stuttgarter Kleinküche), and the "Stuttgart teaching kitchen" (Stuttgarter Lehrküche)—were designed by Meyer and Zimmermann. The Stuttgart kitchen measured roughly 3 by 3 meters (9 m²). Its furnishings followed an L-shaped arrangement that left room for a table, and it opened to the adjoining living or dining area through either a glass partition or a serving hatch.

The adaptability of the Stuttgart kitchen marked a clear departure from the fixed layout of the Frankfurt kitchen, designed by Margarete Schütte-Lihotzky for the Frankfurt housing program. The Stuttgart kitchen's flexibility reflected Meyer's empirical and methodological focus on tailoring design to practical use. The Stuttgart kitchen was brighter and had more open layout than the Frankfurt kitchen. It allowed two people to work simultaneously and served multiple functions. The space was entirely white, well-lit by a large window, and minimally furnished, with everything arranged for easy access and efficient use. White tiling covered the room, and a table and serving hatch were included—features that made it possible to eat in the kitchen, likely for breakfast or a snack, and provided a direct link to the adjoining living space. These kitchens began to take on the qualities of inhabited rooms integrated into the overall domestic environment.

The Stuttgart kitchen was applied to the row housing projects designed by J. J. P. Oud, the municipal architect in Rotterdam, as well as by Adolf Gustav Schneck. The major disadvantage of both the Frankfurt kitchen and the Stuttgart kitchen was that children were out of the cook's sight, and thus in 1928 the Munich kitchen was proposed.
