= Paul Friedrich Posenenske =

German architect (1919–2004)

- Born: 9 September 1919; Breslau, Germany (now Wrocław, Poland)
- Died: April 2004 (aged 84)
- Occupation: Architect

Paul Friedrich Posenenske (1919–2004) was a German functionalist architect.

== Life ==
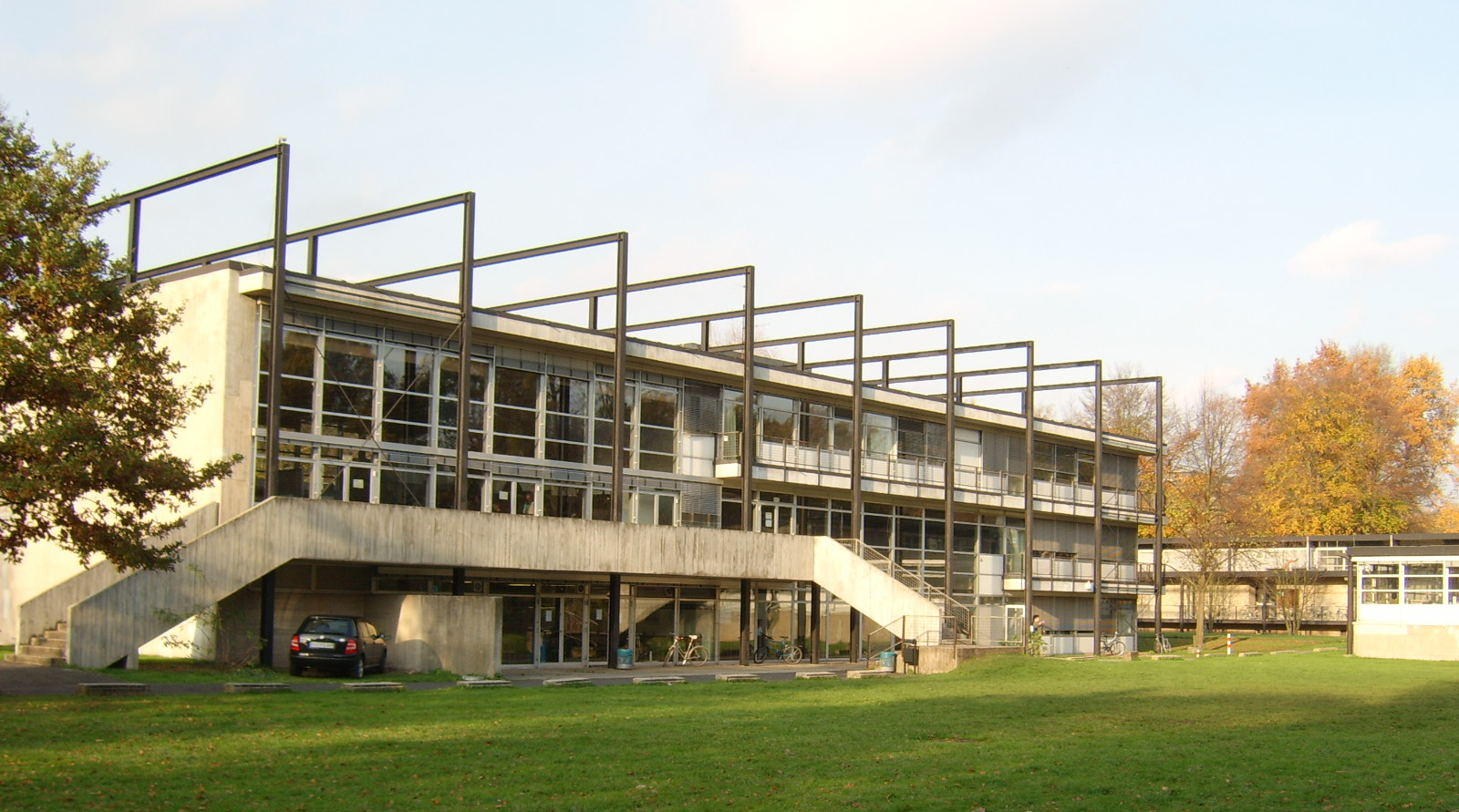
Partial view of the Kunsthochschule Kassel campus, designed by Posenenske

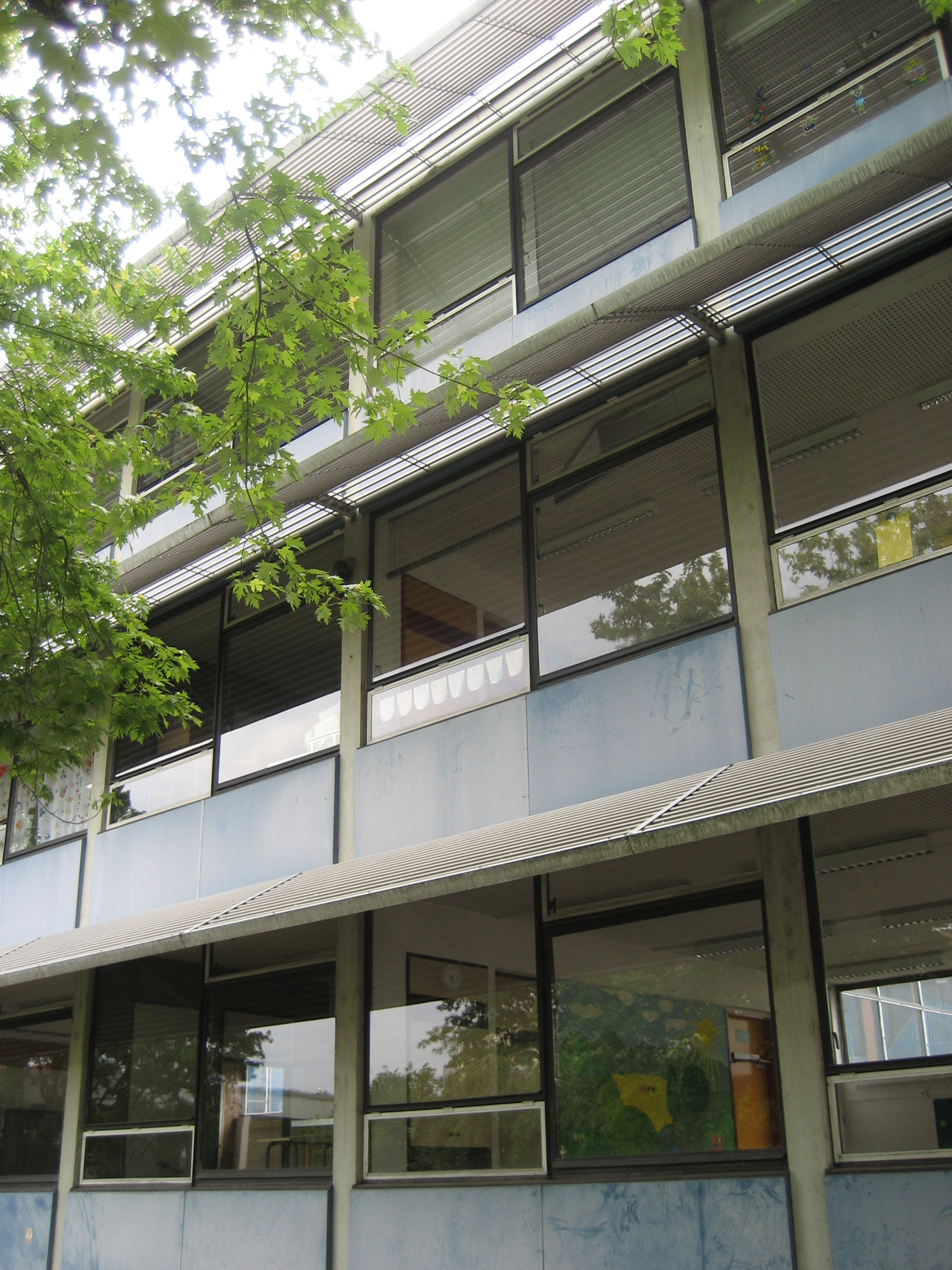
Humboldtschule Offenbach (together with Fritz Novotny from Novotny Mähner Assoziierte)

Posenenske was born on 9 September 1919 in Breslau (now Wrocław, Poland). From 1936 to 1941, he studied at the Technische Hochschulen in Breslau (now Wrocław University of Science and Technology) and in Charlottenburg (now Technische Universität Berlin) and worked from 1945 in various state building departments of Hesse. There, he designed especially public buildings, which are characterized by a very complex modernity. In many buildings, artists were involved, for art and for the color scheme. The dormitories in Frankfurt, however, were very purist and followed the forms which were introduced by Ferdinand Kramer at the Frankfurt University.

From 1958 he was a professor at the State Academy of Fine Arts in Kassel (today part of University of Kassel). In the same year he set up his own architectural offices in Offenbach am Main and Kassel. The transformation of the 18th-century architecture Schloss Wilhelmshöhe with a deliberately avant-garde interior design into a modern museum was heavily criticized by traditionalists.

Paul Friedrich Posenenske was married to the painter and sculptor Charlotte Posenenske. In 1987 he moved with his wife to Pottum Westerwald, where he worked and lived until his death on 21 April 2004.

== Works (selection) ==
- Mourning Hall, Gross-Gerau (1952–1953)
- House Schneidhain in Königstein Ts. (1952–1954)
- Reconstruction of Isenburg castle, Offenbach (1952–1956)
- Humboldt School, Offenbach (1952–1957)
- Elementary school, Zeppelinheim (1953–1954)
- German Weather Service, Offenbach (1955–1957, later demolished)
- Kunsthochschule Kassel (Academy of Fine Arts Kassel), now part of University of Kassel, (1960–1969)
- Reconstruction of the Schloss Wilhelmshöhe in Kassel (1961)
- Evangelical Church, Hassenroth (1961–1967)
- Dormitory Ginnheimer Landstrasse, Frankfurt (1962–1969)
- Cemetery hall Rumpenheim, Offenbach 1972
- Evangelical Lutheran St. Paul's Church, Burgdorf (1973)
- House Posenenske in Radfeldstr., Offenbach (1973)
- Condominium (from competition "Elementa 72"), Bonn 1972
- House in Pottum / Westerwald (1986-1987 renovation, honored as "House of the Year 1991")
