= New Frankfurt =

Public housing program (1925–1930)

The design of the "Rundling" was inspired by ship building

Frankfurt kitchen in the Ernst-May-House

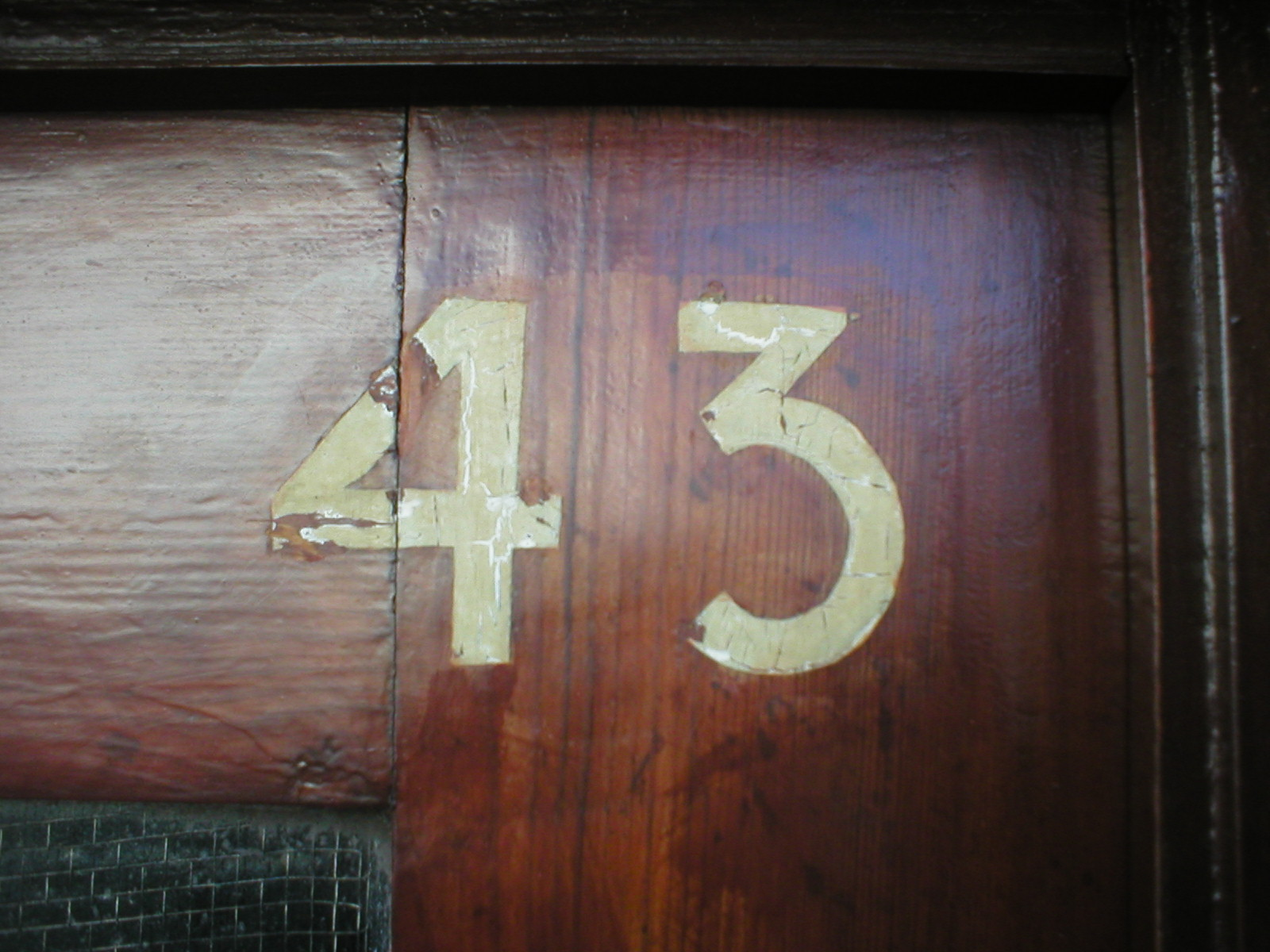
New Frankfurt's typography was designed by Paul Renner, showcased here on a door number. The typeface is regarded as an early version of the seminal Futura

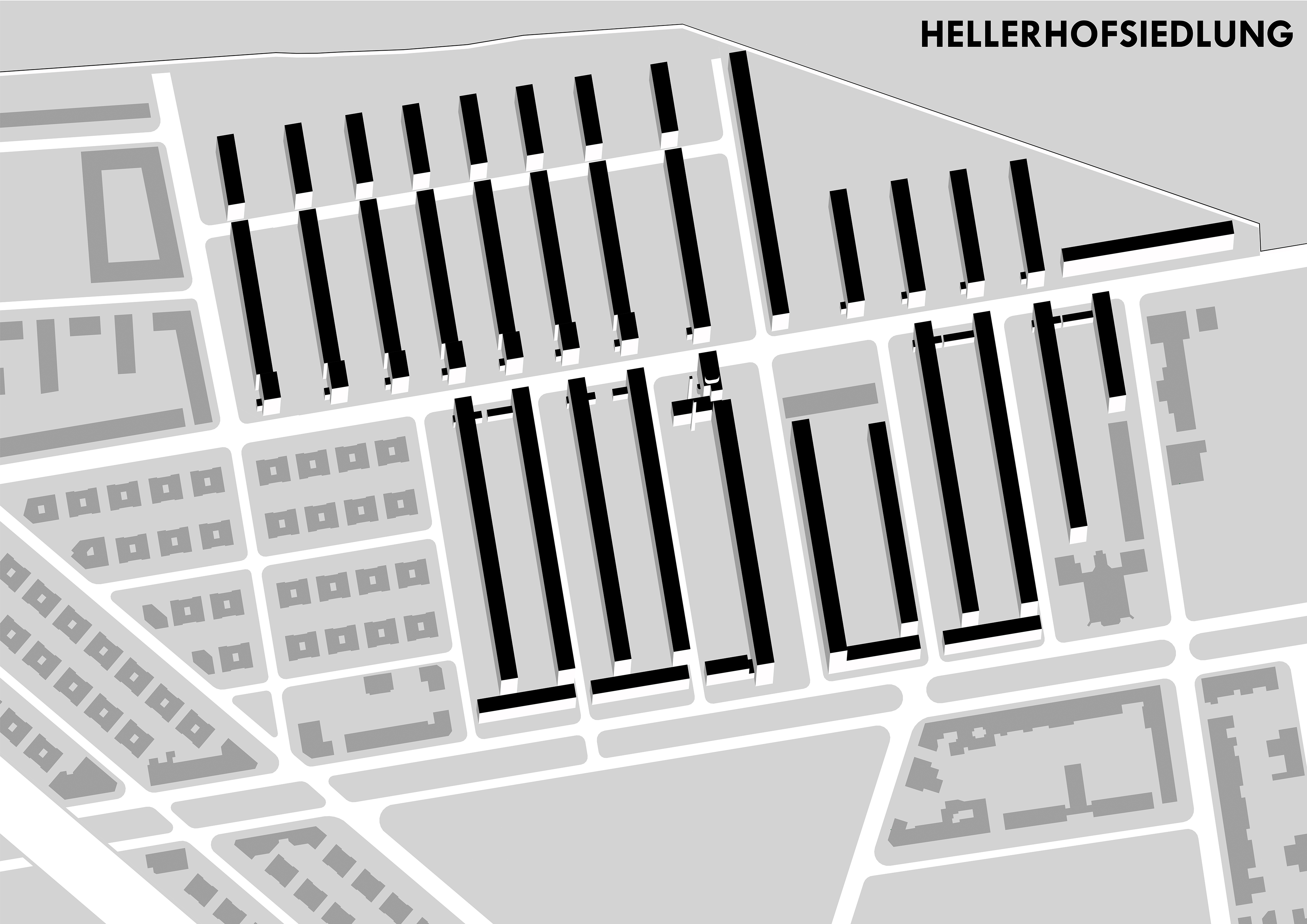
Hellerhofsiedlung 1931

New Frankfurt (German: Neues Frankfurt) was an affordable public housing program in Frankfurt started in 1925 and completed in 1930. It was also the name of the accompanying magazine that was published from 1926 to 1931 dedicated to international trends in architecture, art, housing and education.

== History ==
The project was initiated in 1925, when Frankfurt’s mayor Ludwig Landmann appointed architect Ernst May as the city building councillor. May subsequently led all planning activities and assembled a team of young architects, engineers, artists, and designers –including Max Cetto, Martin Elsaesser, Walter Gropius, Ferdinand Kramer, Adolf Meyer, Bruno Taut, Margarete Schütte-Lihotzky and Mart Stam – to ensure the project was firmly embedded in the city’s wider urban development. This holistic design philosophy distinguished the New Frankfurt from many other contemporary projects.

Under May's leadership, 12,000 apartments were built, 2,000 more than planned. The buildings not only met the basic needs of housing but also set standards for urban development and design, and broke with house building tradition. All apartments and mansions were equipped with a Frankfurt kitchen. Catherine Bauer Wurster visited the buildings in 1930 and was inspired by May's work.

The project was denigrated by the far right and labelled as undeutsch ("un-German"), with Joseph Goebbels calling it "Mr May's small Soviet industry" and describing Ernst May as the "Lenin of German architecture". When the Nazis seized power in 1933, all construction activities were halted, although the estates were apparently later showcased to foreign visitors as examples of National Socialist architecture.

Most employees of the project left Germany after 1933; some followed Ernst May to the Soviet Union, which had invited prominent architects – including Le Corbusier and members of the Bauhaus – to work there.

Following the demolition of several houses designed by Mart Stam and ensuing public protests, the estates were designated as protected landmarks in the late 1970s.

One two-storey terraced house was renovated and restored to its original 1928 condition by the Ernst May Society. Now known as the "Ernst May House", it serves as a museum. The reconstruction was guided by research conducted by architectural historians.

== Selected projects ==
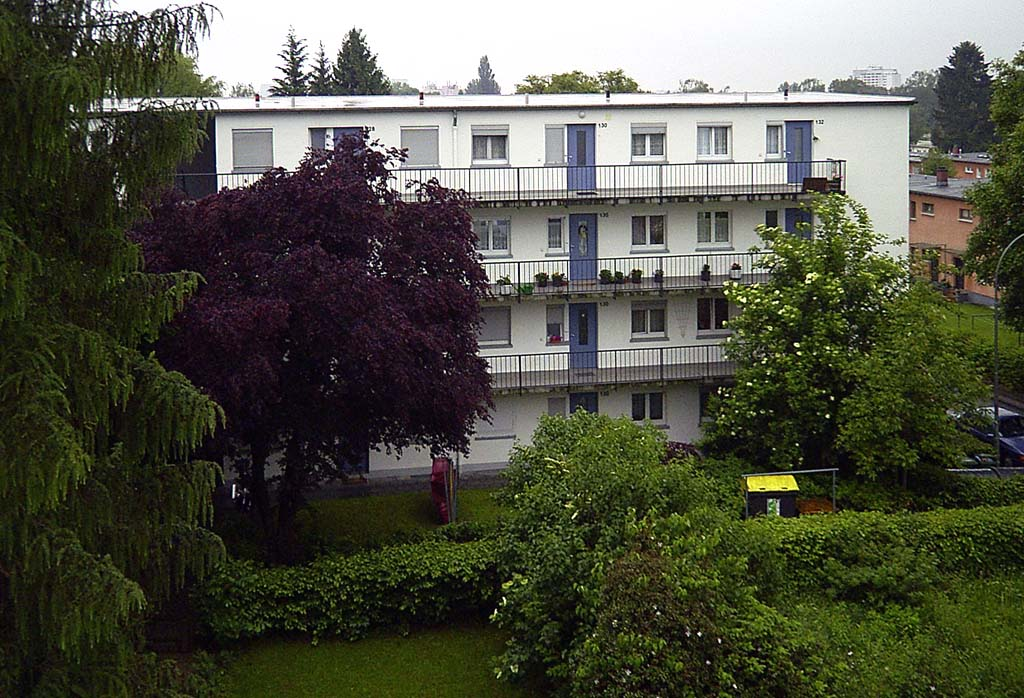
Westhausen

- Villa May, Frankfurt am Main, 1925
- Villa Elsaesser, Frankfurt am Main, 1925–1926
- Estate Höhenblick, Frankfurt am Main, 1926–1927
- Estate Bruchfeldstraße (Zickzackhausen), Frankfurt am Main, 1926–1927
- Estate Riederwald, Frankfurt am Main, 1926–1927
- Estate Praunheim, Frankfurt am Main, 1926–1928
- Estate Römerstadt, Frankfurt am Main, 1926–1928
- Estate Bornheimer Hang, Frankfurt am Main, 1926–1930
- Estate Heimatsiedlung, Frankfurt am Main, 1927–1934
- Estate Hellerhof, Frankfurt am Main, 1929–1932
- Röderberg school, Frankfurt am Main, 1929–1930
- Estate Westhausen, Frankfurt am Main, 1929–1931
- House in Dornbusch, Frankfurt am Main, 1927–1931

== Literature ==
- Henderson, Susan R. (2013). Building culture : Ernst May and the new Frankfurt initiative, 1926–1931. New York. ISBN 978-1-4539-0533-3. OCLC 864140815.
- Lane, Barbara Miller (1985). Architecture and politics in Germany, 1918-1945. Cambridge, Massachusetts. ISBN 0-674-04350-2. OCLC 12051124.
- Treutlein, Christina; Sturm, Philipp; May, Ulrike; Sellmann, Annika; Lecointe, Elisa; Keckeisen, Simon; Ogrin, Mircea; Ernst-May-Gesellschaft (2021). Mayhaus : das Musterhaus des Neuen Frankfurt = the house museum of the Neues Frankfurt. Stuttgart. ISBN 978-3-89986-343-7. OCLC 1233265888.

== See also ==
- Berlin Modernism Housing Estates, Berlin 1926
- Bauhaus and its Sites in Weimar, Dessau and Bernau, 1923–1930
- Weissenhof Estate, Stuttgart, 1927
- Frankfurter Küche
