= Passthrough (architecture) =

Window-like wall opening

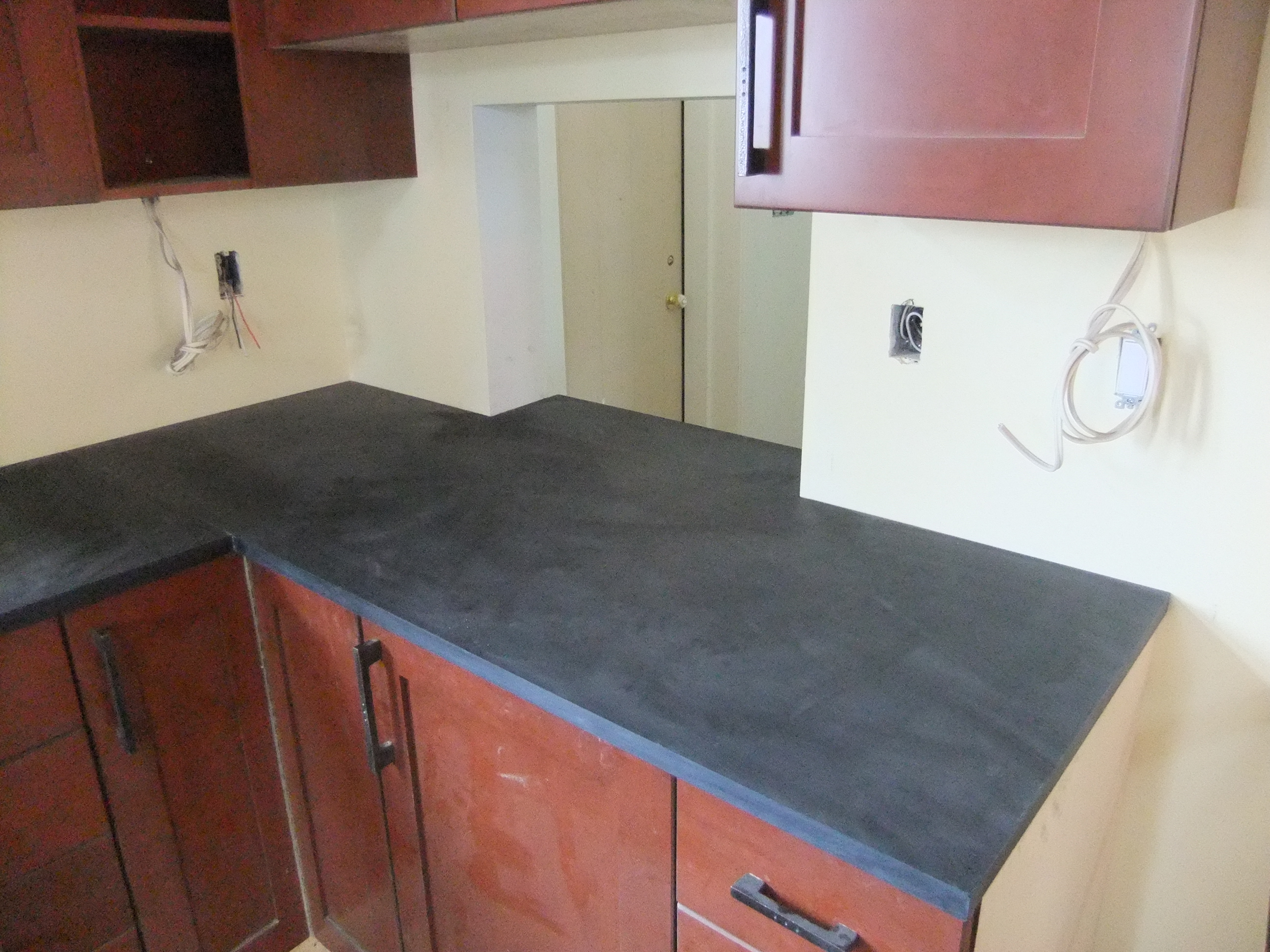
A passthrough in a kitchen

A passthrough (or serving hatch) is a window-like opening between the kitchen and the dining or family room. Considered to be a conservative approach to the open plan, in a modern family home a passthrough is typically built when a larger opening is either precluded by the locations of structural columns or is impractical due to the need to preserve the wall storage space.

If dining involves dedicated waiting staff, the pass-through allows servers to work without stepping into the kitchen; a restaurant design frequently has two passthroughs, one for the food and one for the dirty dishes.

The term "pass-through" is also used for any opening in a wall between the rooms intended for passing items.

== History ==
In monasteries, passthroughs were common both to save walking and to limit the interaction of monks. In hermitic orders, like the Carmelites, every cell had a passthrough in addition to the door, so that a lay-brother could bring food to the monk without one seeing another.

Passthroughs were also used to distribute food to the needy outside of the monastery walls. The passthroughs were then utilized at the food service establishments, like factory canteens and army mess halls.

While serving hatches were used in the kitchens of residential apartments at the end of the 19th century, they are considered as the "radical innovations" of the 1920s. In the 20th century, architects became interested in the application of the Taylor's scientific management theory to the households. Inspired by Erna Meyer with her Stuttgart kitchen — which itself drew from Christine Frederick's Household Engineering (early 1920s) — J. J. P. Oud's kitchen design for the Weissenhof Estate featured a glazed sliding hatch for passing food.

In the UK, the widespread adoption by the households dates to post-Second World War era with its dearth of the household help. The popularity peaked in the 1960s after the introduction of the eye-level grill, but declined in the 1970s with the spread of a recirculating range hood that reduced the need for isolation from the smells and vapors of the kitchen.

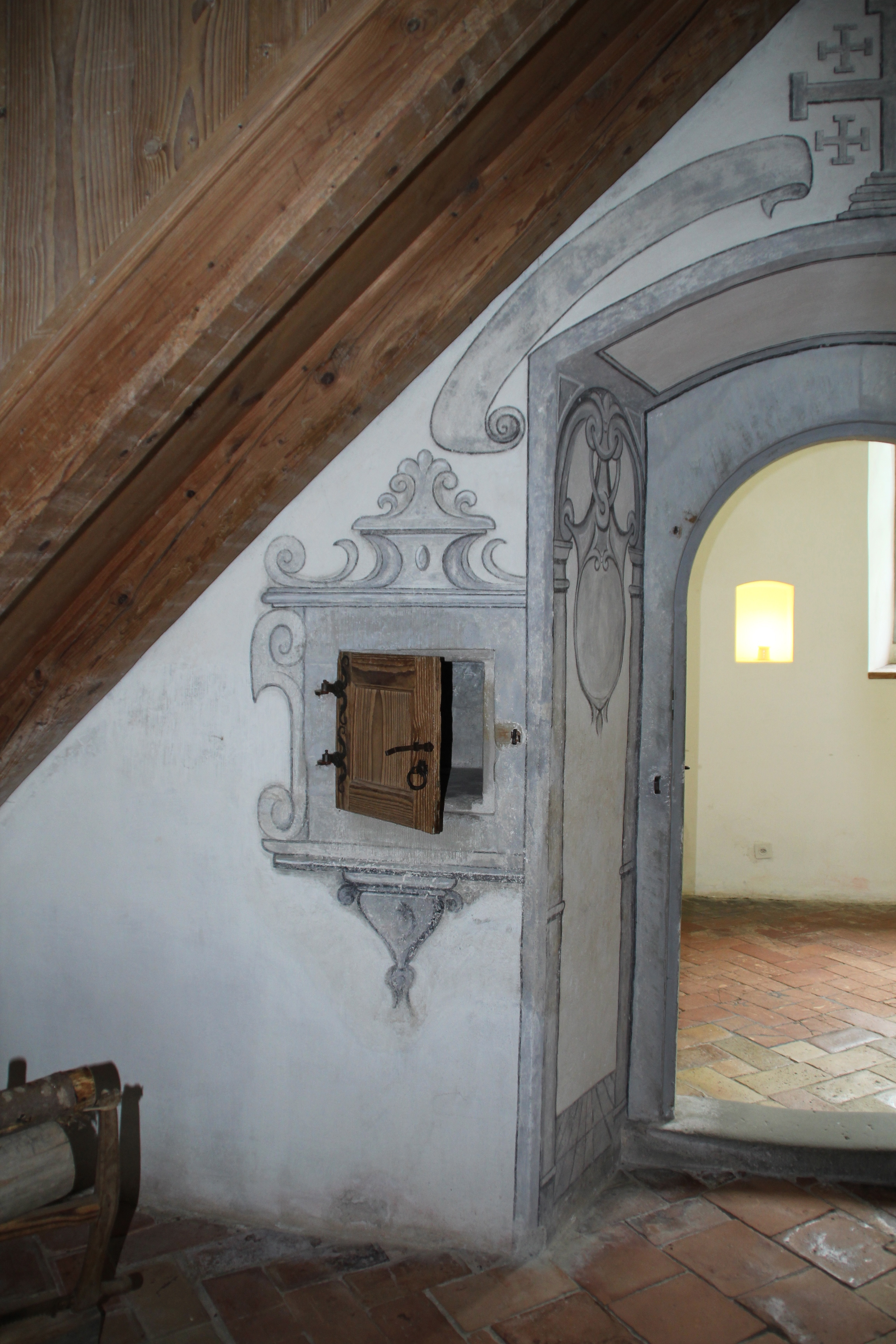
A passthrough next to the door in an ermitic monastery (Ittingen Charterhouse)

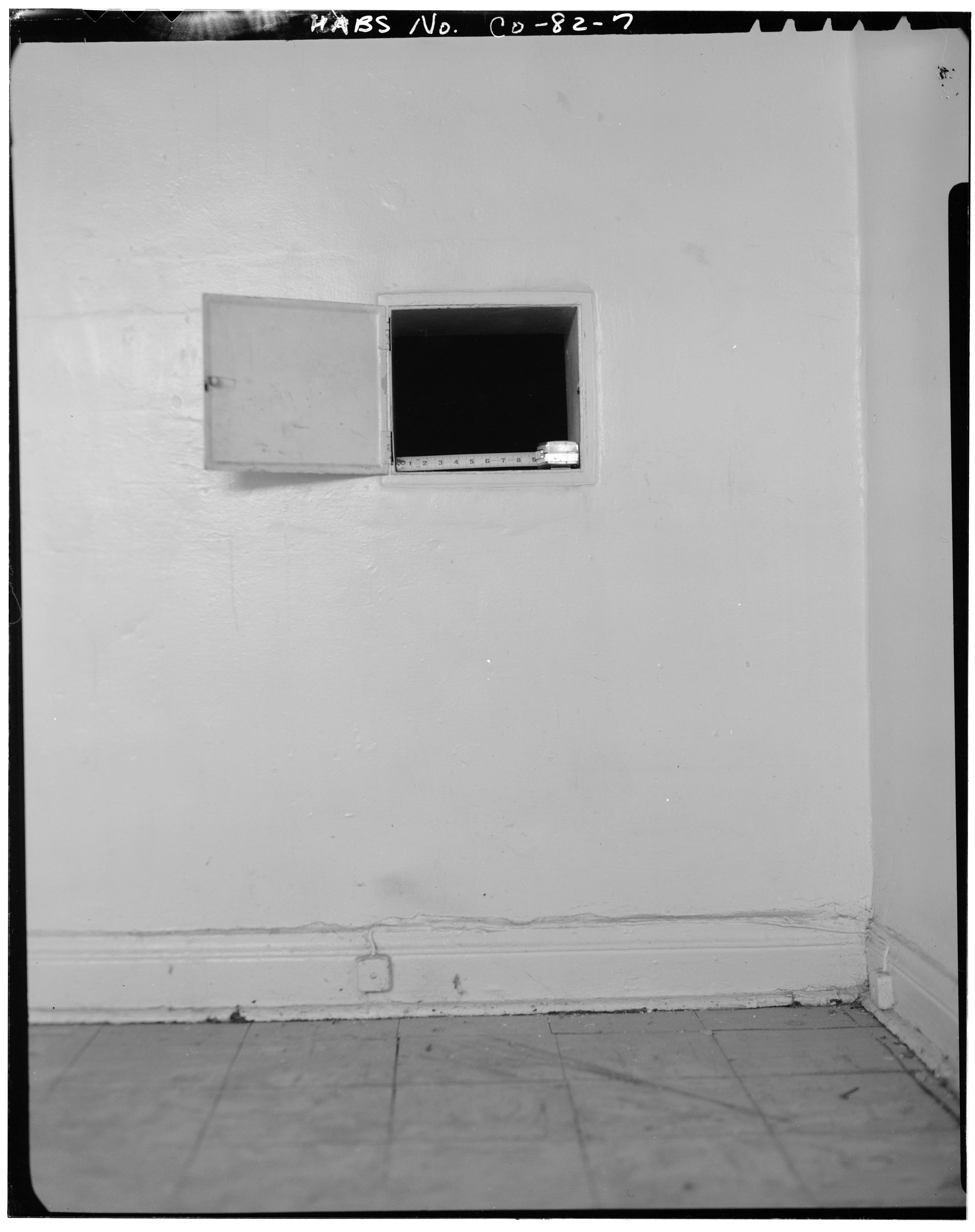
A small passthrough in the wall of the kitchen

== Window for communications ==
In addition to the main purpose of passing the dishes between the kitchen and the dining area, a larger passthrough also improves guest/host communications, adds openness, and brings more light into a smaller kitchen. Passthrough allows the kitchen door to stay shut, with shutters used to further isolate the noise, smell, and messy views of the kitchen from the dining area.

Post-World War II household rearrangements dictated the need for better communications between the kitchen and dining areas. Pre-war, the meal preparations in the middle-class homes involved domestic help, a closed-off kitchen was desirable to keep odors (and voices of servants) out of the public area. With wives becoming solely responsible for the meal preparation, cooking got merged with socializing. The house layout, via passthroughs (or elimination of the kitchen wall altogether), signaled that the kitchen worker was now a wife and a mother, and not a servant.

Stahl House. Large passthrough in a partition wall (view from the kitchen)

In the original design of the Stahl House the boundary between the kitchen and the rest of the space were not just demarcated by a lowered ceiling and a passthrough: the entrance to the kitchen could have been closed off by sliding doors, thus leaving the very large passthrough as the sole means of communication with the rest of the house, still providing the wife a "commanding view". A view from other side of the opening also applies: combined with glass walls, the passthrough facilitates a common feature of the suburban life, surveillance: "…there is no escaping the omnipresent eye of the community" (William Mann Dobriner). This constant visibility (including the household members observing the wife in the kitchen cooking), perpetuated the heteronormative structure of family and society. Just like picture windows, the kitchen passthrough in Stahl House made people on both sides of the opening into spectators.

In the Julius Shulman's series of photos of the Stahl House the passthrough embodies the husband/wife interaction, with the woman in the kitchen and the man on the other side of the passthrough.

== See also ==
- Hagioscope

== Sources ==
- Anstey, Tim Ainsworth (2021). "Serving Hatch". In Penner, Barbara; Forty, Adrian; Horsfall Turner, Olivia; Critchley, Miranda (eds.). Extinct: A Compendium of Obsolete Objects. London; Chicago: Reaktion; University of Chicago Press.
- Barrigan, C. F. (1956). "Restaurant Design". Canadian Journal of Public Health. 47 (10): 438–441. JSTOR 41980984. PMID 13364763.
- Barton, Juliana Rowen (2020). Domesticating Modernism In The American Home, 1942-1966 (PhD thesis). University of Pennsylvania. Archived from the original on November 27, 2024.
- Corrodi, Michelle (2006). "On the Kitchen and Vulgar Odors: The Path to a New Domestic Architecture Between the Mid-Nineteenth Century and the Second World War". The Kitchen. De Gruyter. pp. 21–43. doi:10.1007/978-3-7643-7723-6_3. ISBN 978-3-7643-7281-1.
- Grimes, W. F. (2014-10-24). "Mediaeval Sites: Part Two". The Excavation of Roman and Mediaeval London. Routledge. ISBN 978-1-317-60471-6.
- Miklautz, Elfie; Lachmayer, Herbert (1999). Die Küche: zur Geschichte eines architektonischen, sozialen und imaginativen Raums (in German). Böhlau Verlag Wien. ISBN 978-3-205-99076-5.
- Partsch, B. (2005). "Passhtroughs". The Kitchen Book: The Essential Resource for Creating the Room of Your Dreams. Woman's day specials. Filipacchi Publishing. pp. 64–65. ISBN 978-2-85018-825-1.
- Perks, Sydney (1905). Residential Flats of All Classes. Batsford. p. 47. ISBN 978-5-87740-667-4.
