= How to Cook in Palestine =

1936 cookbook by Erna Meyer

- Author: Erna Meyer, Milka Saphir
- Original title: איך לבשל בארץ ישראל; Wie kocht man in Erez-Israel
- Cover artist: Rico Blass
- Language: Hebrew, English, German
- Genre: Cookbook
- Publisher: Women's International Zionist Organization
- Publication date: 1936
- Publication place: British Mandate of Palestine

How to Cook in Palestine (Hebrew: איך לבשל בארץ ישראל, romanized: Eikh le-Vashel be-Eretz Israel, lit. 'How to Cook in the Land of Israel', German: Wie kocht man in Erez-Israel) is a 1936 cookbook written by the German domestic economist Erna Meyer in a collaboration with the cooking teacher Milka Saphir and published by the Women's International Zionist Organization (WIZO). Meyer, who was Jewish, emigrated to Mandatory Palestine in 1933. It is widely considered the first Jewish cookbook printed in Palestine during the British Mandate.

Meyer aimed to reshape Jewish immigrant culinary habits in Palestine. The book urged Jewish housewives to abandon familiar European cuisine—characterized by heavy meat use and preserved foods—in favor of a simpler, plant-based diet based on local produce, climate, and national ideals. Meyer promoted vegetables and fruits which were alien to the immigrating European Jews, like aubergines, zucchini, olives, and okra, by presenting practical techniques to make them more acceptable. Meyer nonetheless remained rooted in Central European culinary traditions, and her engagement with local Palestinian cuisine was minimal and distanced.

The cookbook focused on health, economy, and national identity, framing the kitchen as a site of cultural transformation. Beyond recipes, the book promoted Jewish-made goods and was aligned with the Totzeret HaAretz movement supporting Jewish industry. The trilingual format—Hebrew, German, English—reflected both practical communication needs and ideological goals like Hebrew revival. The book was a success among Jewish immigrants and praised by Zionist figures for its role in domestic education and cultural adaptation.

== Background ==
In the early 20th century, waves of immigration brought hundreds of thousands of Jews, mostly from Eastern Europe, to settle in the British Mandate of Palestine. Between 1933, when Adolf Hitler rose to power, and 1941, when emigration from Nazi Germany was banned, approximately 60,000 German Jews fled to Palestine. Nearly a third of immigrants were married women who had mostly managed household duties before immigrating. Adapting to Palestine's climate, unfamiliar foods, and new appliances posed major challenges for them. Even with targeted guidance, many women were unprepared for the practical demands of homemaking in their new environment.

Among the German immigrants in Palestine was the published home economics expert Erna Meyer, who arrived in 1933. How to Cook in Palestine, her first book in Palestine, was published in Tel Aviv in 1936 by the Women's International Zionist Organization (WIZO). Meyer relied on the experience of her co-author, Milka Saphir. The book's title varies across the sections: while the English version is titled How to Cook in Palestine, the Hebrew and German editions replace "Palestine" with Eretz Israel, the Hebrew term for the Land of Israel; no explicit reason is given for this inconsistency.

== Contents ==
=== Cooking ethos ===
Although Meyer considered herself and her audience to be Europeans, the book urges Jewish housewives to consciously abandon familiar European culinary habits in favor of a cuisine aligned with the Land of Israel—both in ingredients and in ethos. To Meyer, European culinary habits were marked by minimal use of fresh dairy, an overreliance on preserved foods, prolonged cooking routines, and a diet disproportionately focused on meat. Meyer states that the purpose of the book is to "free our kitchen from its Galuth traditions ... and wholeheartedly adjust ourselves to healthy Palestine cooking." She framed this shift not only as a matter of health and economy, but as a vital step in rooting Jewish life in the "old-new homeland". By emphasizing local produce and straightforward preparation methods suited to the region's hot climate, the cookbook aimed to standardize domestic practice and foster a unified, distinctly local food culture.

How to Cook in Palestine contains 208 recipes. They are typically sparse in detail and often omit precise measurements, likely due to the varied culinary backgrounds of the immigrant readership and the absence of a standardized system of measurement. Rather than romanticizing unfamiliar ingredients, she presents them as practical, beneficial, and adaptable. The book focuses on mainly vegetarian recipes—not out of concern about scarcity but as a reflection of a broader pattern in Zionist cookbooks of the period that sought to distance themselves from the meat-heavy, and often considered unhealthy, dietary habits of the Jewish diaspora.

While it criticizes European foodways as unhealthy and irrational, few recipes in Meyer's cookbook are rooted in Middle Eastern cuisine; most are European dishes adapted to the contemporary conditions of Palestine. This includes modified versions of goulash, sauerkraut, and a full section on potato dishes, a staple in Eastern European Jewish cooking. She does, however, urge the homemaker to consider replacing potatoes, which were expensive in Palestine, with the more easily accessible rice or bulgur, and likewise substitute olive oil for butter.

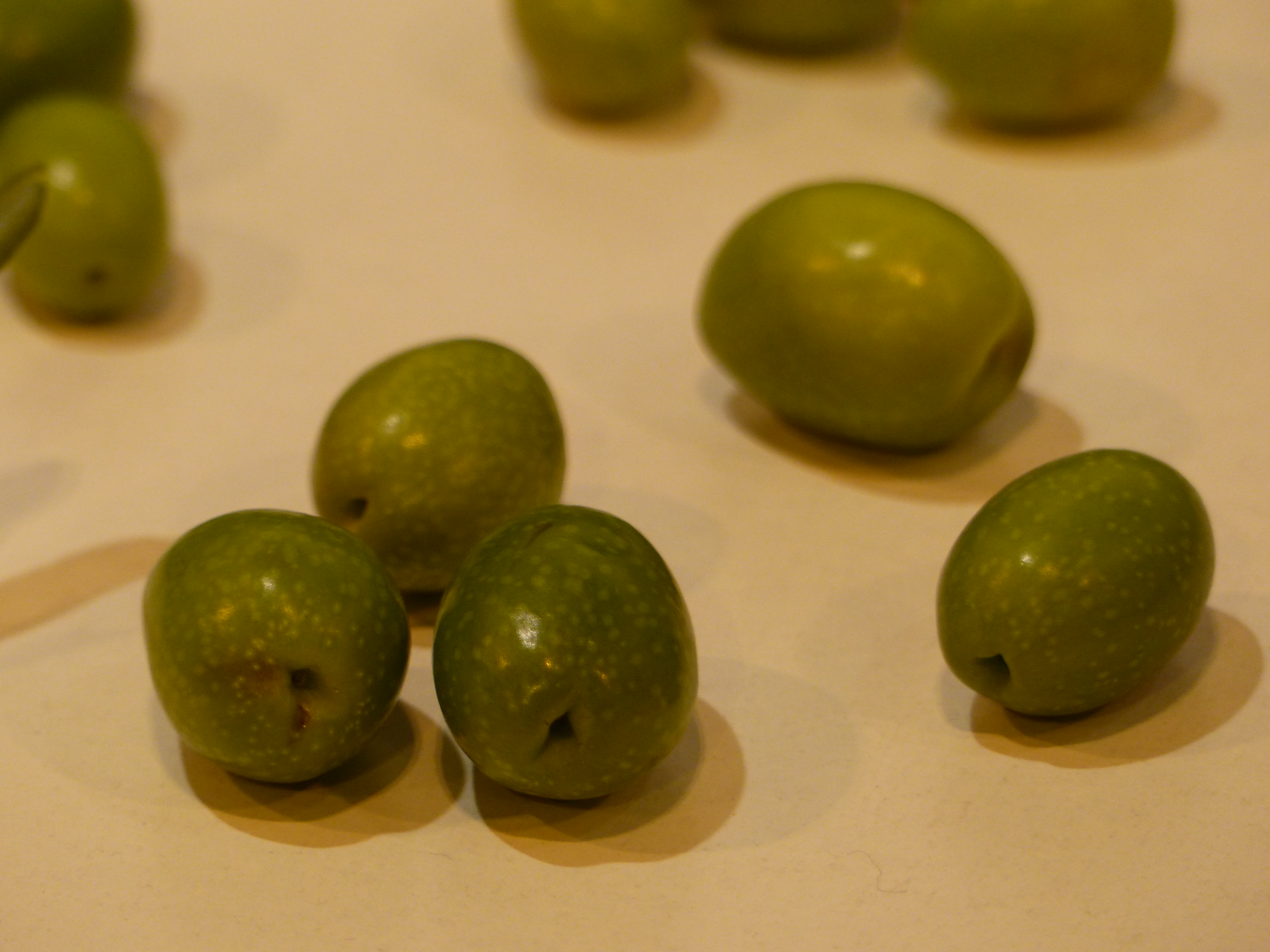
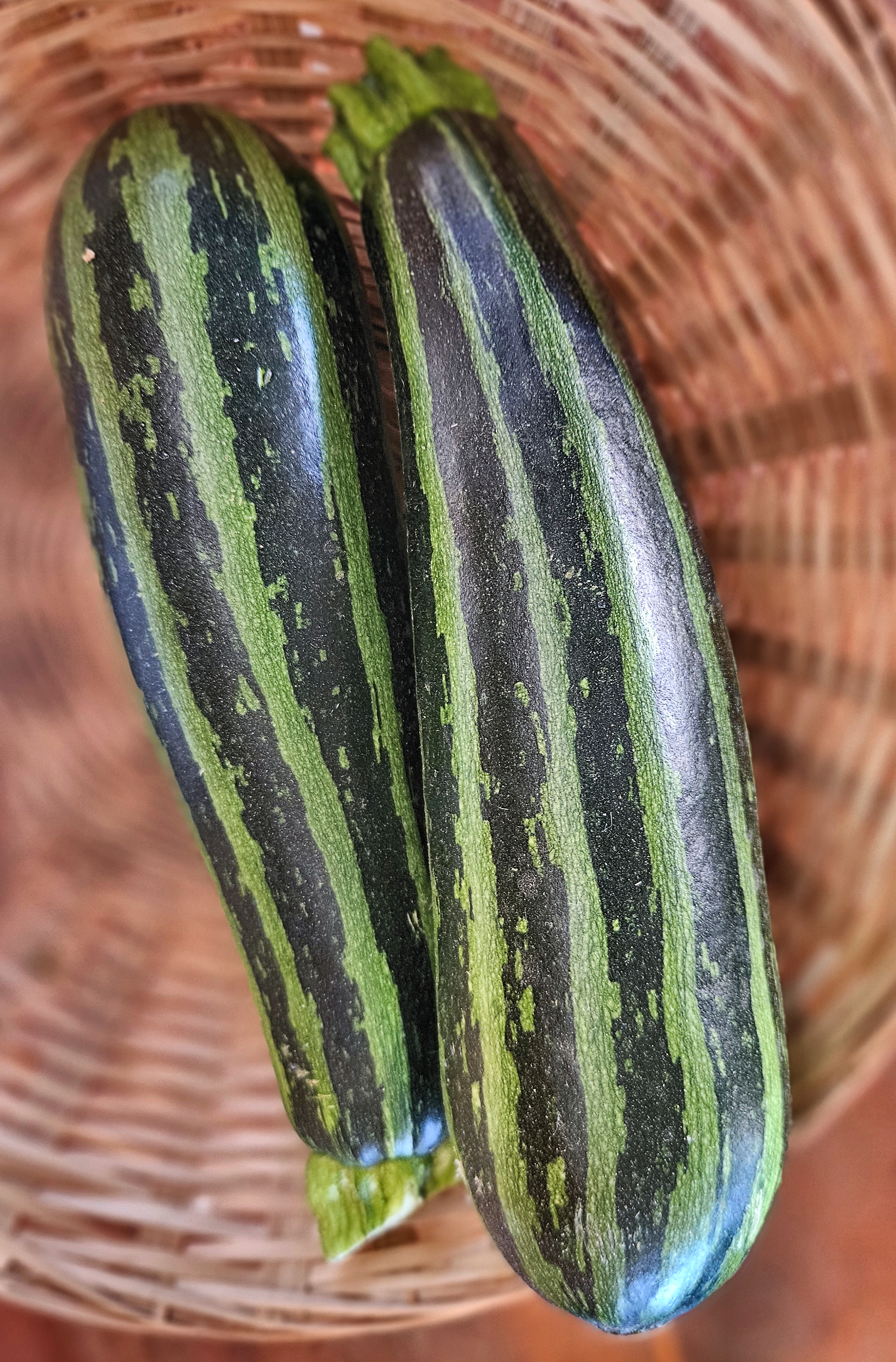
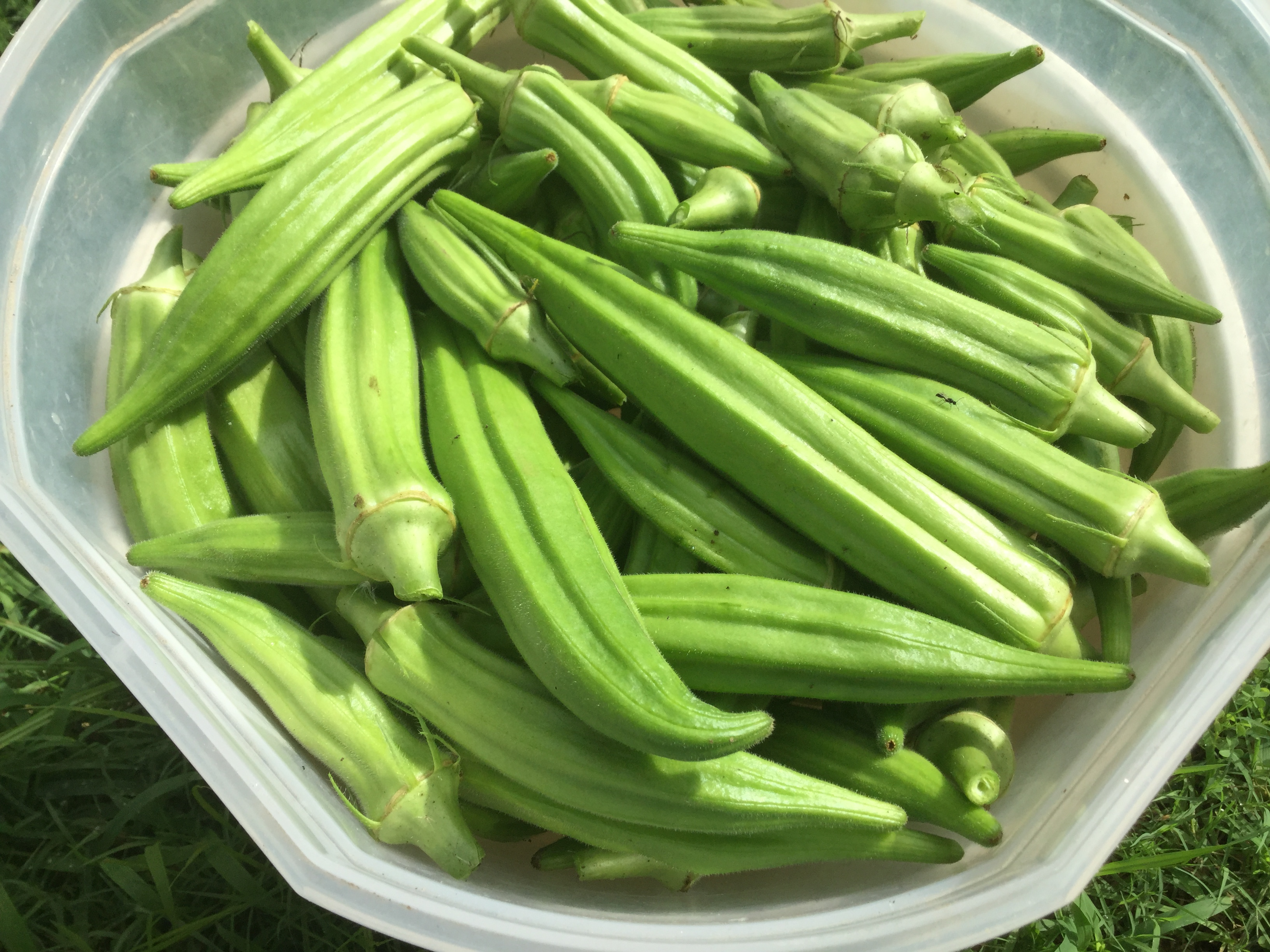
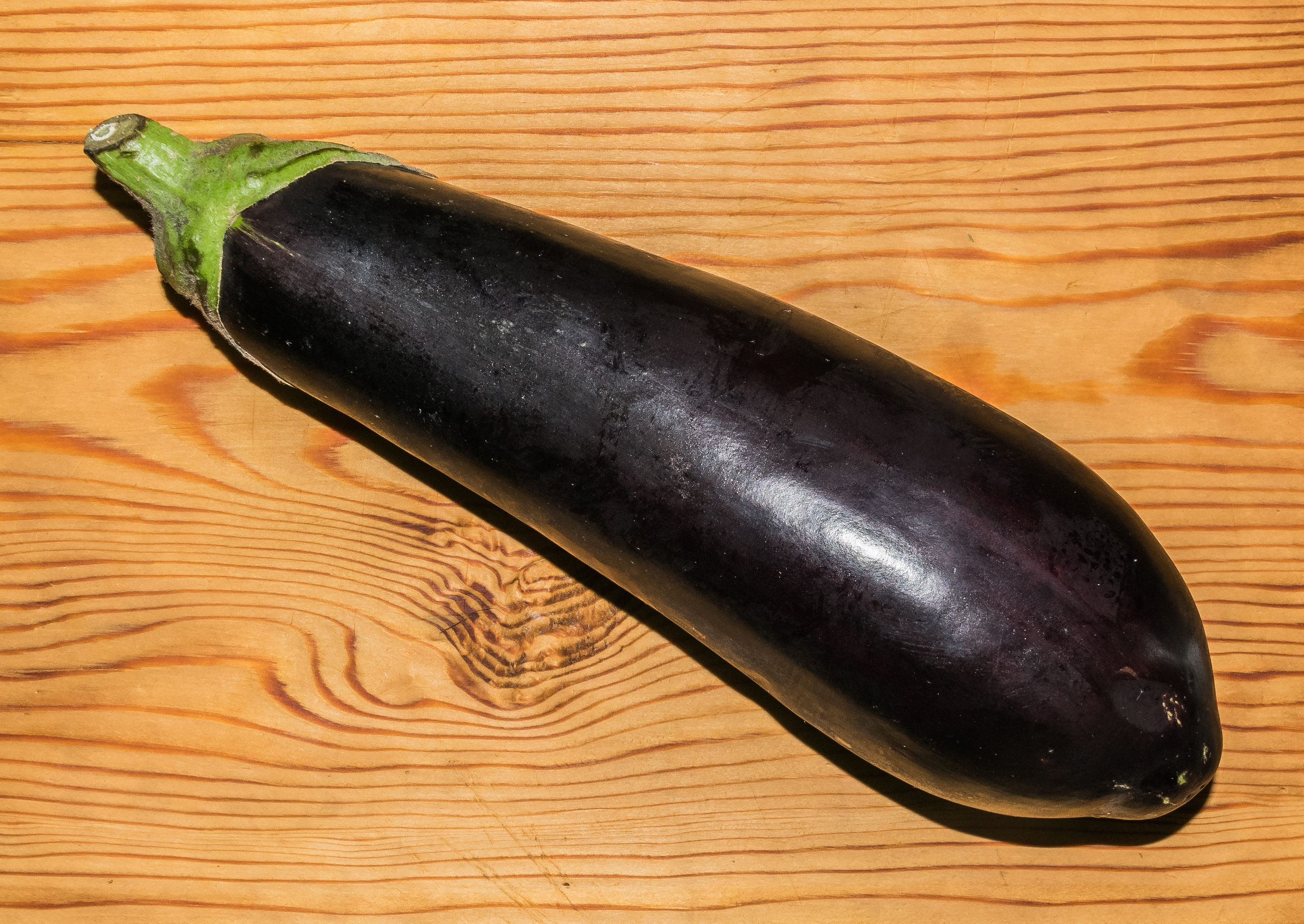
Olives, zucchini, aubergines, and okra (clockwise from upper left) are some of the Palestinian food items which Meyer urged her audience to adopt.

Meyer's aim was not to entice with novelty, but to ease apprehension, especially among immigrants from Central and Eastern Europe, who were unfamiliar with—and reluctant to eat—many fruits and vegetables grown in Palestine, including aubergines, zucchini, olives, and okra. Saphir had for years worked with these "native specialty fruits" at WIZO's home economics school. For instance, a recipe for an aubergine and egg salad is explicitly designed for those who dislike the vegetable's taste, employing boiling, frying, and grilling methods to neutralize its flavor. Similarly, she suggests serving olives as a bread spread to make them more palatable. Exotic vegetables are also introduced through familiar ways of preparation: for example, aubergine replaces meat in the chopped liver, a traditional Ashkenazi dish. Through such techniques, Meyer sought to integrate unfamiliar local foods into the immigrant kitchen while framing this culinary transition as both a rational choice and a national duty.

The cookbook makes no mention of Jewish dietary laws. There is no reference to kashrut, and at one point the text even suggests storing dairy and meat together in the same refrigerator. This omission likely reflects the secular orientation of Zionist ideology at the time, which prioritized national over religious identity.

=== Other advice ===
While cooking is at the core of Meyer's guidance, she also addresses tasks such as washing, tidying, and managing the home. The book contains a detailed section about weights and measurements and a glossary of herbs. Despite urging a fundamental shift in cooking and eating habits, Meyer upheld the conventional belief that homemaking was chiefly a woman's role.

The cookbook is structured in three sections—Hebrew, German, and English—each containing identical recipes. The language choice and the author's consistent pedagogical tone also reflect both practical and ideological concerns. Because new immigrants had yet to master Hebrew, the book contains a dictionary to aid vocabulary acquisition—part of the broader effort to promote Hebrew literacy. German, the author's native language, was also widely spoken among the European immigrant audience. English, as the administrative language of the Mandate, served a functional role within that political context.

== Visual material ==
The design of the book cover signals that its intended audience are European immigrants. It depicts a woman dressed in the fashion of interwar Europe, cooking in front of an outdoor brick wall. With one hand she stirs a pot on a kerosene-powered primus stove, an "icon of low-budget cookery in Palestine". In the other hand she holds a book—the cookbook itself. The inclusion of this detail creates a mise-en-abyme, with the scene is repeated infinitely as a "picture within a picture". To her right lies a tray with local produce—grapes, oranges, zucchini, and aubergines—while to her left sits a prepared dish, carefully presented. In the background, a man and two children are seated outdoors at a laid table, suggesting a domestic family setting. Thus the book articulates Meyer's central aim already in the cover: to promote a shared, cohesive "Palestinian cuisine" rooted in the country's agricultural produce and capable of fostering communal identity among new immigrants.

The book includes illustrations showing, among other things, the proper way to sit or stand during cooking tasks to help prevent fatigue, exhaustion, and back pain.

How to Cook in Palestine integrates frequent advertisements—appearing every few pages—for Jewish-made kitchen products and food items, such as specific brands of oil or more efficient stoves. These advertisements appear only in the Hebrew portion. They are exclusively for Jewish goods, and Meyer consistently urges readers to purchase them, regardless of higher cost or the existence of cheaper Arab alternatives, which she pointedly ignores. Her message is explicit: "The Palestinian housewife's duty is to support home industries." This positioning reveals the cookbook's role within the Totzeret HaAretz campaign, a state-backed effort to promote Jewish agricultural and industrial production as part of the broader nation-building project.

== Transculturalism ==
Meyer's efforts to adapt European culinary principles to Palestine reflect only a limited form of transcultural exchange. While Meyer acknowledges Arab cuisine, her focus remains firmly rooted in Central European culinary traditions: How to Cook in Palestine does not include recipes of Mizrahi or Sephardi Jewish origin.

Like other Zionist cookbooks, which stress the use of local ingredients to assert a connection to the land while obscuring the connection of these foods to the Palestinian people, How to Cook in Palestine highlights ingredients but refuses to name the people behind them. Meyer refers to them distantly as "Arabs" or the "native population", at the same time highlighting the European immigrants' limited ability to embrace the "spicy food" of the native people.

== Reception ==
How to Cook in Palestine became a major success with the Jewish immigrants and brought fame to Meyer among the homemakers. For a price of 10 piasters (£P0.10), the cookbook was available at bookstores, WIZO offices, and grocery stores. Nanny Margulies-Auerbach and Theodor Zlocisti, both prominent Zionist figures, praised the book for its accessible, healthy recipes and its deeper role in supporting immigrant life. Margulies-Auerbach highlighted its contribution to family and community well-being, while Zlocisti saw it as part of a broader transformation of Jewish cuisine in Palestine. It remained in print well into the 1950s.

Today, How to Cook in Palestine is primarily known among specialists and book collectors and has limited recognition among the wider Israeli public. Although its recipes are rarely prepared, the cookbook has begun to attract renewed interest. The book and its contents have been discussed as part of a shared cultural heritage connecting Ashkenazi Israelis with Germany and other parts of Europe.

== See also ==
- Politics of food in the Arab–Israeli conflict
