= Ernst May =

German architect and city planner (1886–1970)

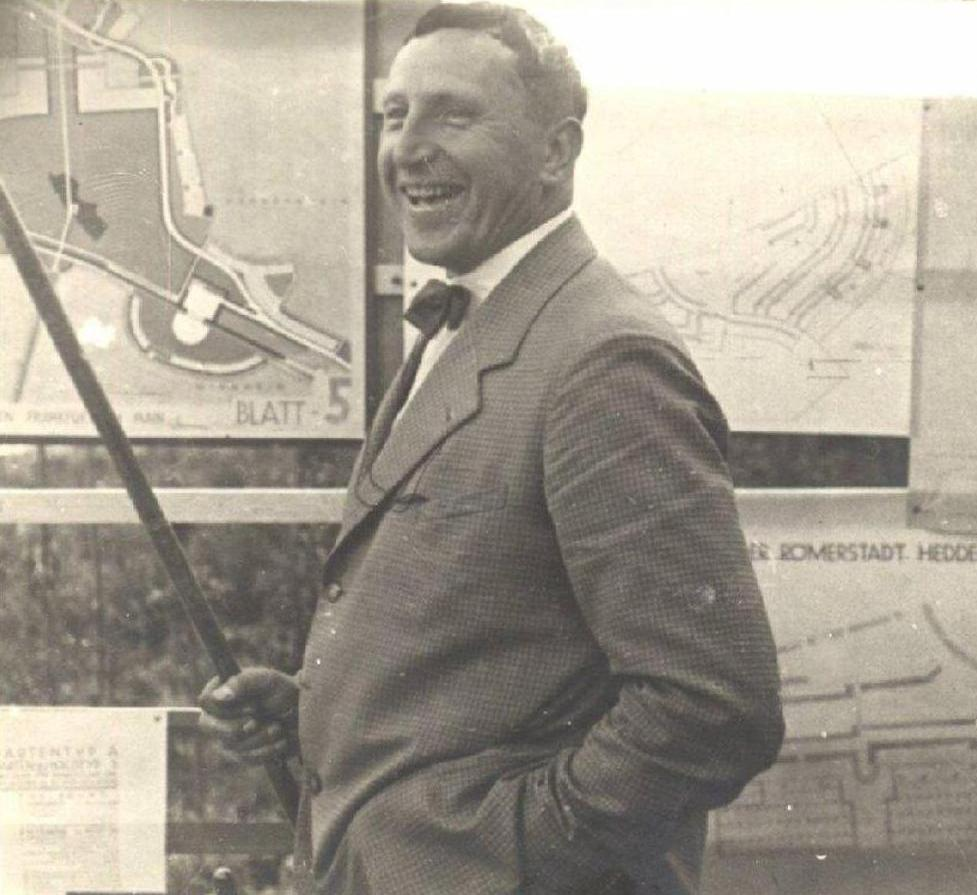
- Ernst May in 1926
- Born: Ernst Georg May; July 27, 1886; Frankfurt am Main, German Empire
- Died: September 11, 1970 (aged 84); Hamburg, West Germany
- Occupation: Architect

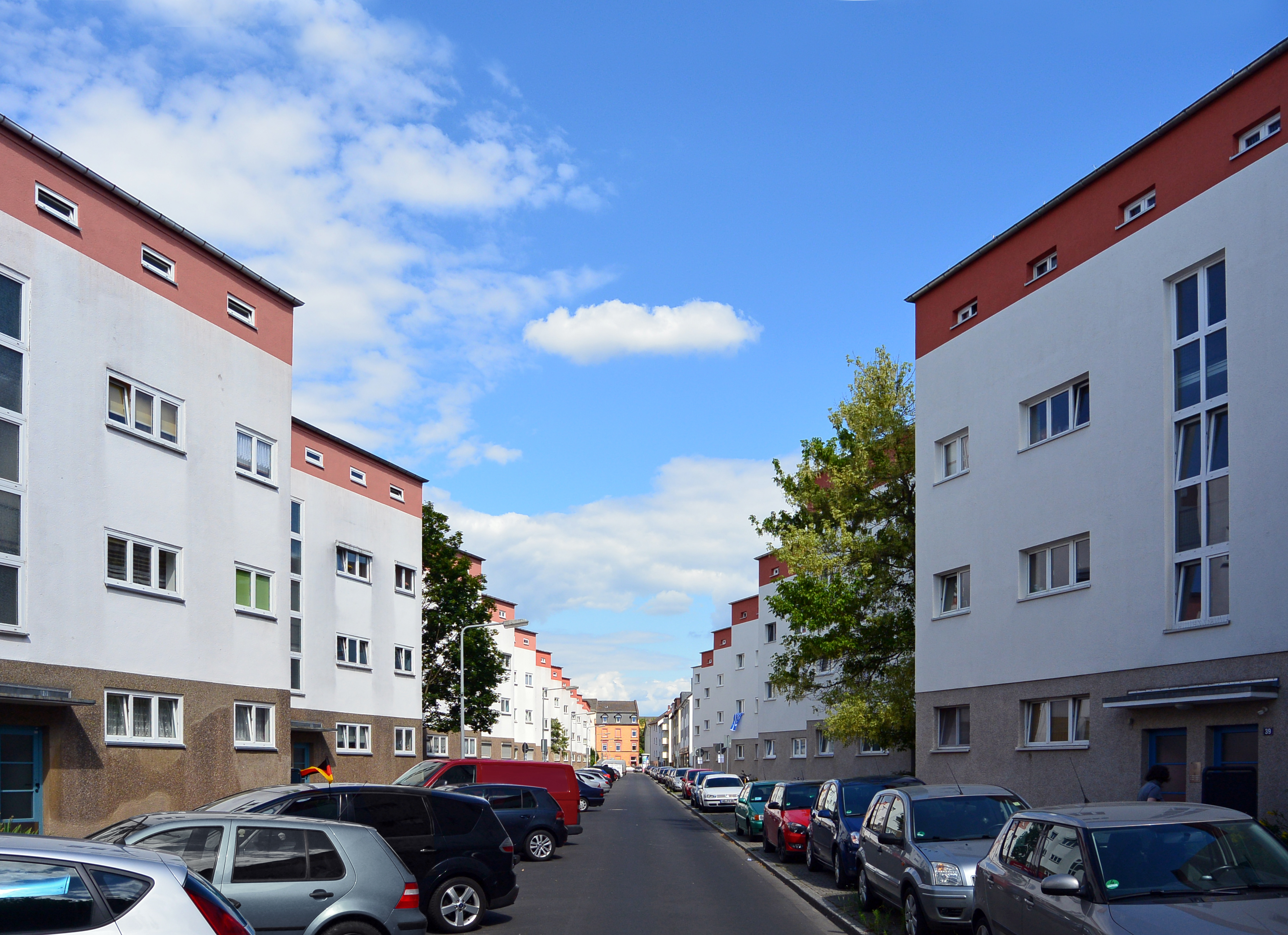
'Zig-Zag Houses' in Frankfurt.

Ernst Georg May (27 July 1886 – 11 September 1970) was a German architect and city planner.

May successfully applied urban design techniques to the city of Frankfurt am Main during the Weimar Republic period, and in 1930 less successfully exported those ideas to Soviet Union cities, newly created under Stalinist rule. It is said May's "brigade" of German architects and planners established twenty cities in three years, including Magnitogorsk. May's travels left him stateless when the Nazis seized power in Germany, and he spent many years in African exile before returning to West Germany near the end of his life.

== Life ==
May was born in Frankfurt am Main, the son of a leather goods manufacturer. His education from 1908 through 1912 included time in the United Kingdom, studying under Raymond Unwin, and absorbing the lessons and principles of the garden city movement. He finished a study at the Technical University of Munich, working with Friedrich von Thiersch and Theodor Fischer, a co-founder of the Deutscher Werkbund.

Working for himself and others through the 1910s, in 1921 he helped win a competition for rural housing estate developments in Oltaschin, near Breslau. His concepts of decentralized planning, some of which had been imported from the garden city movement, he won the job of city architect and planner for his home city from 1925 through 1930. Working under Mayor Ludwig Landmann, the position gave him broad powers of zoning, financing, and hiring. There was copious funding and an available labor pool. He used them.

The "Rundling" in Römerstadt, Frankfurt

== The New Frankfurt ==
In the context of a housing shortage and a degree of political instability, May assembled a powerful staff of progressive architects and initiated the large-scale housing development program New Frankfurt. May's developments were remarkable for the time for being compact, semi-independent, well-equipped with community elements like playgrounds, schools, theatres, and common washing areas. For the sake of economy and construction speed May used simplified, prefabricated forms. These settlements are still marked by their functionality and the way they manifest egalitarian ideals such as equal access to sunlight, air, and common areas. Of these settlements the best known is probably Siedlung Römerstadt, and some of the structures are colloquially known as Zickzackhausen (zig-zag houses).

In 1926 May sent for Austrian architect Margarete Schütte-Lihotzky to join him in Frankfurt. Lihotzky was a kindred spirit and applied the same sort of functional clarity to household problems, and so in Frankfurt, after much analysis of work habits and footsteps, she developed the prototype of the modern installed kitchen, and pursued her idea that "housing is the organized implementation of living habits".

May's Frankfurt was a civic and critical success. This has been described (by John R. Mullin) as "one of the most remarkable city planning experiments in the twentieth century". In two years May produced more than 5,000 building units, up to 15,000 units in five years, published his own magazine (Zeitschrift Das Neue Frankfurt) and in 1929 won international attention at the Congrès International d'Architecture Moderne. This also brought him to the attention of the Soviet Union.

Catherine Bauer Wurster visited the buildings in 1930 and was inspired by the work of May

== The 'May Brigade' in the USSR ==
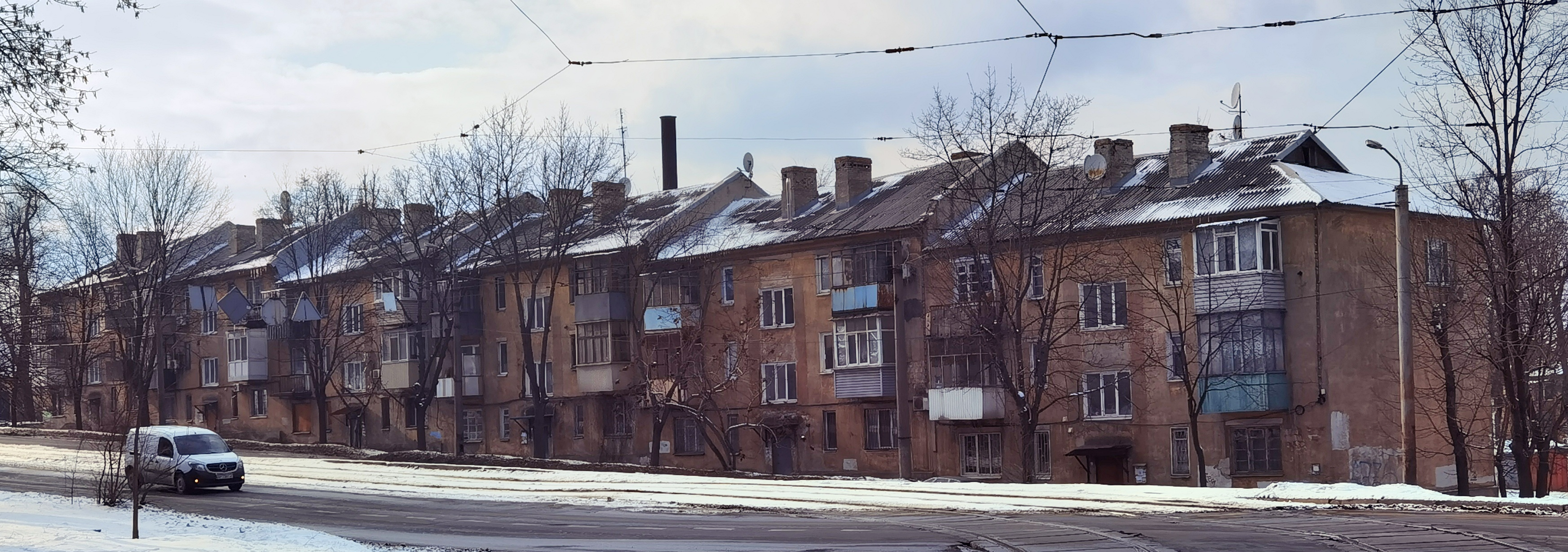
Ernst May house in Dnipro, Ukraine.

In 1930 May took virtually his entire New Frankfurt-team to the USSR. May's Brigade amounted to a task force of 17 people, including Margarete Lihotzky, her husband Wilhelm Schuette, Arthur Korn, the Hungarian-born Fred Forbat, the Swiss Hans Schmidt, the Austrian-born Erich Mauthner and the Dutch Mart Stam. The promise of the "Socialist paradise" was still fresh, and May's Brigade and other groups of western planners had the hope of constructing entire cities. The first was to be Magnitogorsk. Although May's group is indeed credited with building 20 cities in three years, the reality was that May found Magnitogorsk already under construction and the town site dominated by the mine and blast furnaces under construction. Officials were indecisive, then distrustful, corruption and delay frustrated their efforts, and May himself made misjudgements about the climate. May's contract expired in 1933, and he left for British East Africa (Kenya). Some of his architects found themselves unwanted by Russia, and stateless.

The 1995 documentary film Sotsgorod: Cities for Utopia ("Socialist Cities") interviewed some of the last survivors of these groups: Margarete Lihotzky, Jan Rutgers, and Phillipp Tolziner of the Bauhaus Brigade, and visited four of the planned cities: Magnitogorsk, Orsk, Novokuznetsk and Kemerovo.

After May's departure, the Soviet government began promoting the criticism of his ideas, methods and achievements. Criticism was severe, widespread, and had ideological underpinnings. He was characterized as an undesirable capitalistic and Western influence that should be contraposed to the socialistic and Soviet architectural trends. In the mid-1930s, the Soviet government adopted the policy of not inviting any foreign architects.

== Ernst May in Kenya and post-war Germany ==
May worked as a farmer in Kenya, but soon sold his farm and opened an architectural office, designing commercial buildings, hotels and schools. In some projects he collaborated with architect and urban planner Erica Mann: for instance his Oceanic Hotel in Mombasa was a landmark within the master plan drawn up for Coast Province by Mann. In 1953 the Mau-Mau uprisings made it difficult to work. At the same time May was invited to return to Germany and work on housing projects. In December 1953 he sailed to Germany and started again as an architect. From 1954 through 1956 he led the planning department in Hamburg, and was involved in several large housing projects in other cities. Several of the most famous German postwar settlements and reconstruction plans, such as New-Altona in Hamburg and Neue Vahr in Bremen, are associated with his name.

He was the first person awarded an honorary Dr.-Ing. of the Hannover Technical University. From 1957 he taught as an honorary professor of the Technische Universität Darmstadt. During this time May also wrote several books on urbanism. He died in Hamburg in 1970, aged 84.

His eldest son, Klaus May, also became an architect and worked in the office of his father. His most famous work is the new synagogue in Hamburg, which became a protected landmark. His youngest son, Thomas May, moved from the family home in Kenya in 1947 to obtain an engineering degree at Syracuse University, USA. Thomas May produced many craft works of distinction, including cabinetry, chairs, tables and lighting after debuting his designs in the seminal Museum of Contemporary Crafts show in New York City in 1957.

== Projects ==
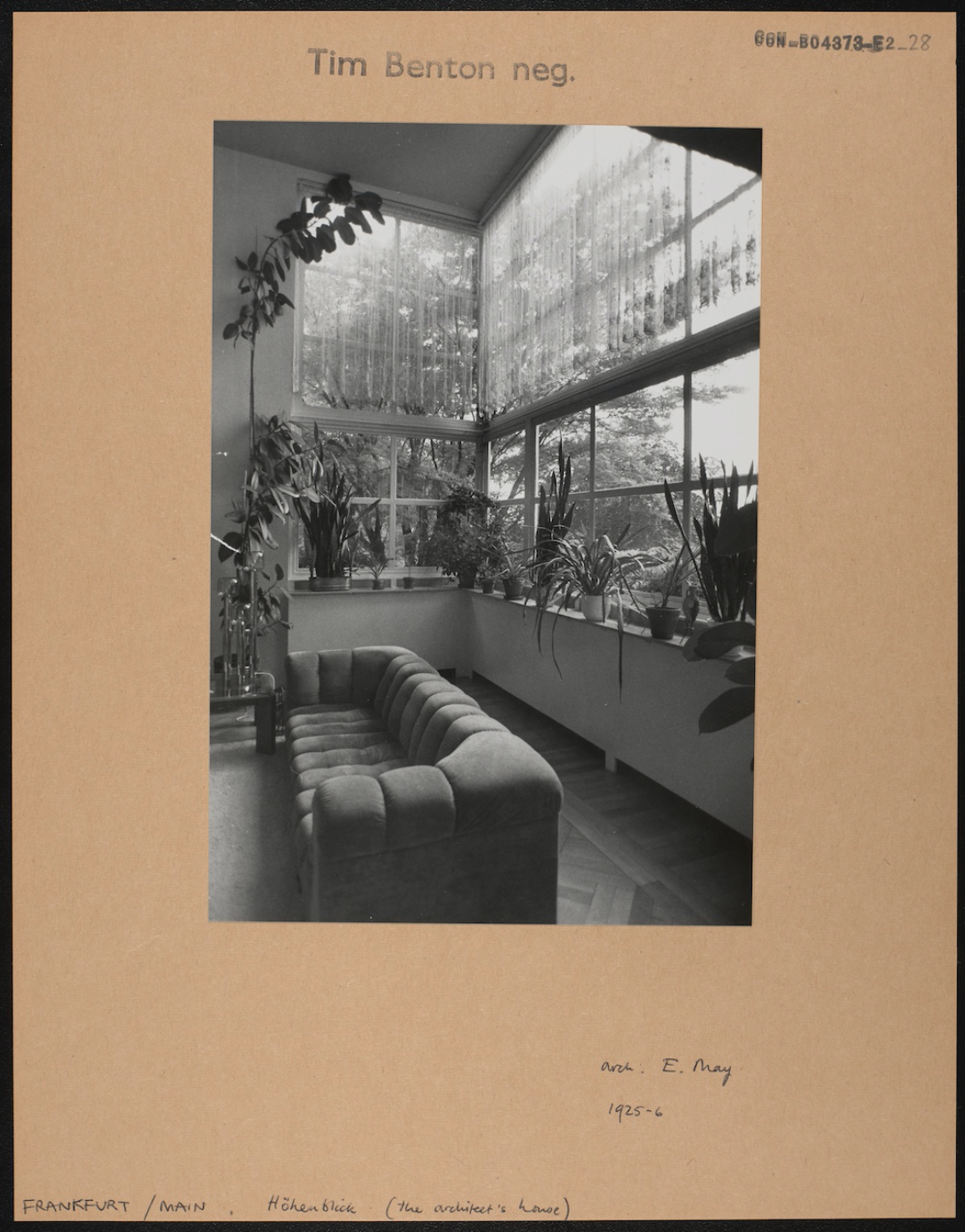
- A photograph of the interior of an Ernst May building in Frankfurt. Labelled "Architect’s House. Photograph by Tim Benton. CON B04373 F002 028". The Courtauld Institute of Art. CC-BY-4.0
  Villa May, Frankfurt am Main, 1925
- Villa Elsaesser, Frankfurt am Main, 1925–1926
- Estate Höhenblick, Frankfurt am Main, 1926–1927
- Estate Bruchfeldstraße (Zickzackhausen), Frankfurt am Main, 1926–1927
- Estate Riederwald, Frankfurt am Main, 1926–1927
- Estate Praunheim, Frankfurt am Main, 1926–1928
- Estate Römerstadt, Frankfurt am Main, 1926–1928
- Estate Bornheimer Hang, Frankfurt am Main, 1926–1930
- Estate Heimatsiedlung, Frankfurt am Main, 1927–1934
- Estate Hellerhof, Frankfurt am Main, 1929–1932
- Röderberg school, Frankfurt am Main, 1929–1930
- Estate Westhausen, Frankfurt am Main, 1929–1931
- House in Dornbusch, Frankfurt am Main, 1927–1931
- Commercial buildings and factories in Nairobi and Kampala
- House for an African family, 1945
- Estate St. Lorenz-Süd, Lübeck, 1954–1957
- Estate Grünhöfe, Bremerhaven, 1954–1960
- Neu Altona, Hamburg, 1955–1960
- Garden estate Vahr, Bremen, 1954–1957
- Neue Vahr, Bremen, 1956–1961
- Architectural competition Fennpfuhl in Berlin-Lichtenberg, 1956–1957 (East-Berlin), 1st prize
- Estate Parkfeld, Wiesbaden, 1959–1970
- Estate Rahlstedt-Ost, Hamburg, 1960–1966
- Estate Klarenthal, Wiesbaden, 1960–1965
- Adolf-Reichwein-Schule, Heusenstamm, 1964–1965
- Estate Kranichstein, Darmstadt, 1965–1970

== Literature ==
- D. W. Dreysse: Ernst May housing estates: architectural guide to eight new Frankfort estates, 1926–1930. 1988
- Susan R. Henderson: Building Culture: Ernst May and the New Frankfurt Initiative, 1926–1931, Peter Lang, 2013
