= Erna Meyer =

German-Israeli home economist and sociologist

Erna Konstanze Fanny Karoline Meyer (née Pollack; 13 February 1890 – March 1975) was a German and Israeli home economist and sociologist. She was an active participant of the Women's International Zionist Organization in Palestine. She earned a doctorate in household economics and gained recognition for promoting efficient domestic work and modern home design. After emigrating to Palestine in 1933, she wrote articles and gave lectures and cooking classes. She authored two bestselling books: The New Household, which promoted the rationalization of housework, and How to Cook in Palestine, a cookbook aimed at German-Jewish immigrants.

== Early life ==
Erna Pollack was born into an assimilated Jewish family in the German capital, Berlin, on 13 February 1890. She was the youngest of five children and the only daughter. From 1908 to 1913, she studied political economy at Friedrich Wilhelm University. She completed a doctorate with a thesis titled Der Haushalt eines höheren Beamten in den Jahren 1880–1906 ("The household of higher public officers between 1880 and 1906 based upon their accounts"), based on her father's household ledger.

Erna Pollack married Arnold Meyer, an Allgemeine Elektricitäts-Gesellschaft engineer. While her husband was stationed in Austria during the First World War, she worked with war widows and in orphanages in Upper Silesia. She later operated a soup kitchen in Vienna that served 13,000 people each day. Following the war, the Meyers lost their property to the newly established Czechoslovakia. They relocated first to Nuremberg and then to Munich, where she took a job as a secretary at a publishing house. In the 1920s they planned a wooden house in Unterzeismering on Lake Starnberg and settled there in 1927.

== Career ==
=== Germany ===
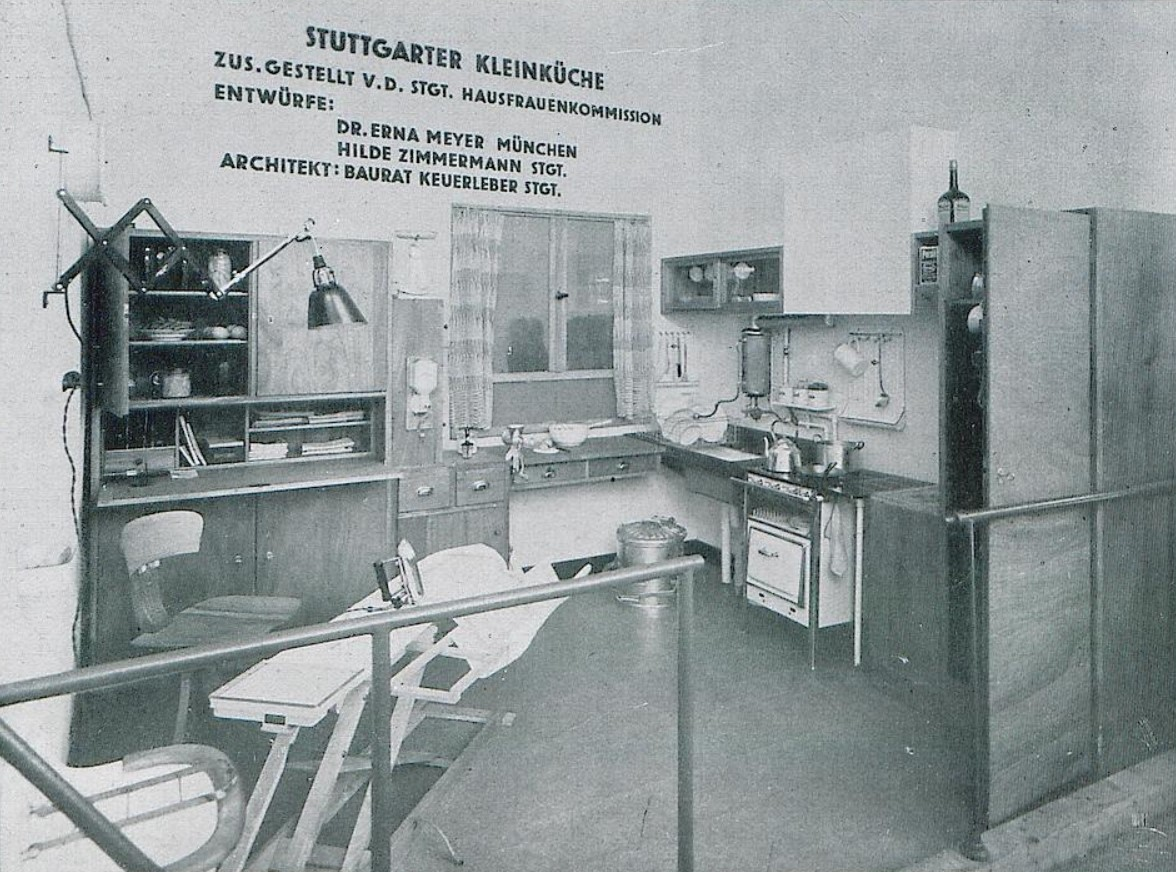
Meyer co-designed this 1927 kitchen with a focus on efficiency and rational use of space.

Erna Meyer gained wide recognition with the 1926 publication of The New Household (German: Der neue Haushalt), where she advocated for the rationalization of domestic labor and urged cooperation between architects and housewives to create more efficient household designs. She presents the rationalizing of housework as transformative for all aspects of a woman's life and for society as a whole. While she personally pursues different priorities within her own marriage, she does not challenge the broader social division of labor between the sexes. The book went on to see over 40 editions and became one of the most widely read household manuals of the interwar years, with an impact that extended well beyond the Weimar Republic.

Meyer was particularly interested in the rationalization of housework. Her advice was sought by furniture manufacturers and modernist architects such as Ludwig Mies van der Rohe and J. J. P. Oud. She took part in the Reich Research Society for Economic Efficiency in Building and Housing and was involved in exhibitions promoting new models of domestic life—including "The Dwelling" (Die Wohnung), shown in 1927 at the Deutscher Werkbund exhibition at the Weissenhof Estate. As an authority on practical household matters, Meyer set standards for kitchens and furnishings and oversaw the kitchen section of the indoor exhibition. The exhibit featured four Stuttgart kitchens illustrating the principles of "rational housekeeping", three of which Meyer designed with Hilde Zimmermann. In 1928, with the architects Hanna Löw and Walther Schmidt, Meyer designed the Munich kitchen, which allowed for children to be minded while cooking.

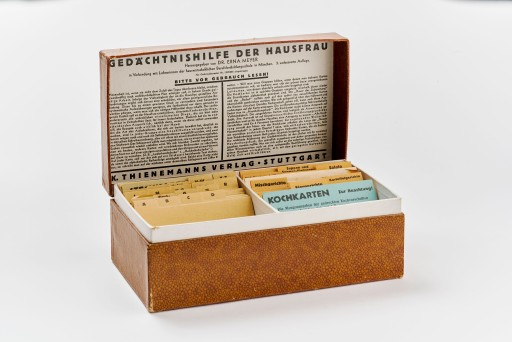
Meyer designed the "Memory Aid for the Housewife", a household card file, in 1930.

In 1929, Erna and Arnold Meyer founded the monthly magazine Neue Hauswirtschaft ("New Home Economics"), which brought together contributions from political scientists, psychologists, economists, and social workers. Between 1929 and 1933, Meyer wrote regularly for both architectural periodicals and women's magazines and served as editor of Neue Hauswirtschaft.

=== Palestine ===
Meyer's husband died in 1932. She was summarily dismissed from her job without notice in 1933 when the Nazis came to power. She consequently left Germany in late 1933 and emigrated to Palestine. During the 1930s, she served in a range of consulting and educational roles, including with the Women's International Zionist Organization (WIZO) and the Palestine Electric Corporation.

Meyer became active in promoting Zionist approaches to health and nutrition. This included giving lectures on Palestinian cuisine with cooking demonstrations, teaching cooking classes and offering counseling for German housewives, and presenting domestic skills at the 1934 Expo Tel Aviv. She also contributed to the Jüdische Rundschau and maintained a regular column in the Mitteilungsblatt. In 1936, she published her first post-migration cookbook, How to Cook in Palestine, which primarily targeted recent immigrants from Germany. It was widely successful, and Meyer quickly became a well-known figure among homemakers, who even asked her for autographs. In 1940 she published another cookbook, Kitchen Notes in Times of Crisis (Küchenzettel in Krisenzeiten).

Despite her continued involvement after emigration, Meyer was unable to regain the influence that she had once held in Germany. In the following decades, her public profile steadily diminished. She died in March 1975 in Haifa.

== Publications ==
- Der neue Haushalt: Ein Wegweiser zu wirtschaftlicher Hausführung von Erna Meyer. Mit 203 Bildern und 12 Tafeln (in German). Franck'sche Verlagshandlung. 1927.
- Haushaltungsbuch (in German). K. Thienemann. 1930.
- How to Cook in Palestine. Women's International Zionist Organisation. 1936.
- Küchenzettel in Krisenzeiten: zeitgemässe Rezepte und Menu-Zusammenstellungen für den Haushalt (in German). Verlag Joachim Goldstein. 1940.
