= Tugendhat chair =

Chair designed by Ludwig Mies van der Rohe

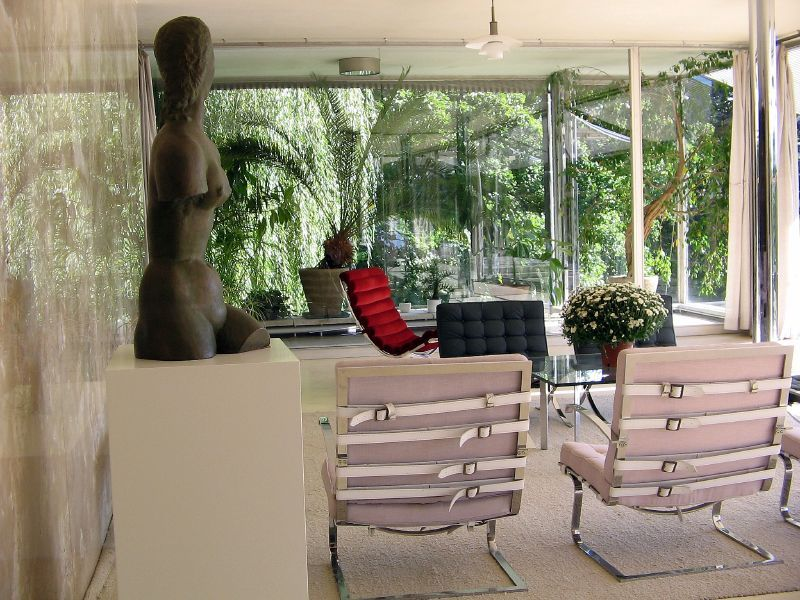
Furniture in the Tugendhat House, including two Tugendhat chairs (foreground)

The Tugendhat chair (model number MR70) is a modernist cantilever chair designed by Ludwig Mies van der Rohe in collaboration with Lilly Reich 1929–1930 for the Tugendhat House in Brno, Czechoslovakia.

In appearance, the Tugendhat chair is somewhat of a hybrid of van der Rohe and Reich's 1929 Barcelona chair and 1929–1930 Brno chair. Like the Barcelona chair, the Tugendhat chair has a large padded leather seat and back, supported by leather straps mounted on a steel frame and legs. However, like one variant of the Brno chair, the frame is flat, solid steel, formed into a C-shape under the seat to create a cantilever. Versions exist with or without leather-padded steel arms. The metal was originally polished stainless steel; modern examples are often chrome-plated.

It was first produced by Joseph Müller Berliner Metall-Gewerbe. It was later licensed to American furniture manufacturer Knoll, who produced a limited number of the chairs with and without arms from 1948. Gerry Griffith in Chicago created examples in the 1960s for use in the United Airlines Executive Office Building designed by Bruce Graham of Skidmore, Owings & Merrill.
