= Around the World in 80 Treasures =

- Genre: Documentary; Adventure travel
- No. of episodes: 10

Production
- Producer: BBC

Original release
- Network: BBC Two
- Release: 21 February – 18 April 2005

Around the World in 80 Treasures is a 10-episode art and travel documentary series by the BBC, presented by Dan Cruickshank, and originally aired in February, March, and April 2005. The title is a reference to Jules Verne's novel Around the World in Eighty Days.

In the series, Cruickshank takes a five-month world tour visiting his choices of the eighty greatest man-made treasures, including buildings and artifacts. His tour takes him through 34 countries and six of the seven continents (he does not visit Antarctica). He does not visit Iraq due to the dangerous state of the country at the time.

In addition to seeing some of the world's treasures, Cruickshank tries many different kinds of food including testicle, brain, and insects. His means of transportation included aeroplanes, trains, camel, donkey, foot, hot air balloon, bicycle, scooter, Volkswagen Beetle, hang glider, and boats.

A tie-in book of the same title was also published, written as a journal during the trip and containing much behind-the-scenes detail on the making of the programme in addition to Cruikshank's reflections on the treasures themselves.

The official BBC DVD of the series was released on 19 May 2008. Licenses for DVD releases have been sold to many countries around the world.

The UKTV channel Eden frequently repeats the series. However episodes are edited down to 46 minutes, to allow for adverts to be shown in the one-hour time slot.

== Episode 1: Peru to Brazil ==
#	Location	Treasure	Image	Brief description
1	Andes, Peru	Machu Picchu	Machu Pichu	Widely recognized mountain city of the Inca Empire discovered in 1911.
2	Maras, Peru	Incan salt pans	Maras	The Incans used giant pools on the side of the Andes to evaporate water from brine to leave salt.
3	Nazca, Peru	Nazca Lines	Nazca Lines	Over 300 immense dirt drawings and lines preserved since the 6th to 3rd century BC by the extreme arid environment.
4	Lambayeque, Peru	Spider necklace of Sipán	Lord of Sipán	A necklace made up of 10 gold objects of the Spider God.
5	Trujillo, Peru	Chan Chan	Chan Chan	The world's largest mud city estimated to be home of 30,000 people and covers 20 square kilometres.
6	Easter Island, Chile	Moai statues	Moai buried to their shoulders Rano Raraku Easter Island	Moai, large monolithic statues with oversized heads created by the Rapanui people between 1200 and 1700 CE. The picture shows a group of Moai buried to their shoulders on the outer slopes of Rano Raraku.
7	Cuiabá, Brazil	Umahara Headdress of the Rikbaktsa people	Rikbaktsa	Very colourful headdresses made of human hair and parrot feathers (red, yellow, blue).
8	Rio de Janeiro, Brazil	Christ the Redeemer	Christ the Redeemer	

== Episode 2: Mexico to Central North America ==
#	Location	Treasure	Image	Brief description
9	Southern Mexico	Palenque	Palenque's Observation Tower	Mayan city showcasing some of their finest architecture, sculpture, and stucco reliefs.
10	Tollan Tula, Mexico	The Giants of Tula	Giants of Tula	10th century stone sculptures/columns of Toltec warriors dressed in feathers and gods.
11	Mexico City, Mexico	Man, Controller of the Universe	Man, Controller of the Universe	Painting by Diego Rivera commissioned by Nelson Rockefeller embodying the struggle between capitalism and communism. A recreation of the destroyed original Man at the Crossroads.
12	Cortez, Colorado, United States	1851 Navy Colt revolver	Colt 1851 Navy Revolver	Mass-produced six-shot handgun used in the American Civil War and subsequently used in fulfilling the Manifest Destiny.
13	Colorado, United States	Mesa Verde National Park	Mesa Verde National Park	A small community built under a rock shelf by the ancestors of the pueblo heirs.
14	Charlottesville, Virginia, United States	Monticello	Monticello	Home designed and built in the late 18th century by Thomas Jefferson.
15	New York City, United States	Statue of Liberty	Statue of Liberty	A 151-foot tall statue given by France to the United States to commemorate the centennial since the American Declaration of Independence.
16	New York City, United States	Seagram Building	Seagram Building	A skyscraper that represents the quintessence of the skyscraper commercial design.

== Episode 3: Australia to Cambodia ==
#	Location	Treasure	Image	Brief description
17	Sydney	St James' Church	St. James Church	Masterpiece of convict architect Francis Greenway, and one of Australia's oldest church buildings.
18	Kakadu, Australia	Kakadu rock art	Rock painting at Ubirr in the Kakadu National Park	Aboriginal rock art from Kakadu National Park, Northern Territory.
19	Torajaland, Sulawesi, Indonesia	Spirit houses	Toraja house.	These houses with a boat shaped roof symbolize the people's afterlife.
20	Torajaland, Sulawesi, Indonesia	Tau Tau	Toraja burial site.	Wooden statues representing the ancestor, the members of the tribe that have died.
21	Java, Indonesia	Borobudur Stupa	Borobudur Stupa	One of the greatest Buddhist stupas (giant, pyramidal Buddhist temple) in the world. It was built in the 8th century and has nine levels.
22	Ayutthaya, Thailand	Gold Elephant	Wat Ratchaburana	Gold elephant kneeling with a howdah found in the crypt of Wat Ratchaburana, Ayutthaya. A beautifully finished masterpiece of the goldsmith's art. Studded and encrusted with gems. Made in about 1420, the same time as the tower in which it was found. National Museum, Ayutthaya, Thailand.
23	Siem Reap, Cambodia	Angkor Wat	Angkor Wat	The temple at Angkor Wat. It's man's vision of heaven, a Hindu image of the celestial city. Angkor Wat is a legacy of the mighty king Suryavarman the Second and dates back to the mid-12th century.
24	Angkor Thom, Cambodia	Stone Faces of Bayon	Stone face of Bayon	The walls adorned with huge and powerfully carved faces in the city of Angkor Thom built by Jayavarman VII a mile away from Angkor Wat.

== Episode 4: Japan to China ==
#	Location	Treasure	Image	Brief description
25	Tokyo, Japan	Katana/Samurai sword	17th century katana	The katana, also commonly referred to as a "samurai sword".
26	Himeji, Japan	Himeji Castle	Himeji Castel	Flatland-mountain Japanese castle complex located in Himeji in Hyōgo Prefecture and comprising 83 wooden buildings. It is occasionally known as ("White Heron Castle") because of its brilliant white exterior. It was rebuilt more than 400 years ago.
27	Kyoto, Japan	Ryōan-ji Zen Buddhist Garden	Garden of Ryōan-ji	A Zen temple located in northwest Kyoto, Japan. Belonging to the Myoshin-ji school of the Rinzai branch of Zen Buddhism, the temple is one of the Historic Monuments of Ancient Kyoto, a UNESCO World Heritage Site.
28	Beijing, China	Forbidden City	Forbidden City	The Forbidden City is the largest palace in the world. It was built by the mighty Ming dynasty 600 years ago.
29	Beijing, China	The Summer Palace Park	The Summer Palace	The Summer Palace is mainly dominated by Longevity Hill (60 meters high) and the Kunming Lake. It covers an expanse of 2.9 square kilometers, three-quarters of which is water.
30	China	Great Wall of China	Great Wall of China	A series of stone and earthen fortifications in northern China, built, rebuilt, and maintained to protect the northern borders of the Chinese Empire during various successive dynasties.
31	Xi'an, China	Terracotta Army	Terracotta Army	The Terra Cotta Warriors and Horses of Qin Shi Huang the First Emperor of China. The terracotta figures were discovered in 1974 by some local farmers near Xi'an, Shaanxi province, China near the Mausouleum of the second Ming Emperor.
32	Shanghai, China	Ming dynasty porcelain	Ming Dynasty porcelain	Shanghai Museum boasts one of the finest Ming porcelain collections in the world.

== Episode 5: India to Sri Lanka ==
#	Location	Treasure	Image	Brief description
33	Kolkata, India	Durga	Durga	In Hinduism, the Goddess Durga is a form of Devi, the supremely radiant goddess, depicted as having ten arms, riding a lion or a tiger, carrying weapons (including a lotus flower), maintaining a meditative smile, and practicing mudras, or symbolic hand gestures.
34	Sri Lanka	Sigiriya	Sigiriya	The city of Sigiriya was created by King Kasiyapa in the years around 470, 480 A.D. with a colossal rock on which was perched, the fortress and palace.
35	Polonnaruwa, Sri Lanka	Giant Buddha	Giant Buddha	This giant Buddha was created in the 1180s and he measures about forty metres, carved in very hard granite out of the cliff face behind. With his robes wrapped round his body, his head reclining on a pillow.
36	Kandy, Sri Lanka	Buddha's Tooth	Inside the temple	According to Sri Lankan legends, when the Buddha died, his body was cremated in a sandalwood pyre at Kusinara in India and his left canine tooth was retrieved from the funeral pyre by Arahat Khema. Khema then gave it to King Brahmadatte for veneration. It became a royal possession in Brahmadatte's country and was kept in the city of Dantapuri (present day Puri in Orissa).
37	Kochi, India	Spices of Cochin	Indian spices	Cochin was at the centre of the crossroads of the international spice trade, making it one of the most important places on Earth.
38	Madurai, India	Meenakshi Temple	Meenakshi temple	Meenakshi Sundareswarar Temple or Meenakshi Amman Temple Tamil: is a historic Hindu temple located in the holy city of Madurai, Tamil Nadu, India. It is dedicated to Lord Shiva (in the form of Sundareswarar or Beautiful Lord) and his consort, Goddess Parvati (in the form of Meenakshi).
39	Jaipur, India	Jantar Mantar observatory	Jantar Mantar observatory	The Observatory was started in 1728.
40	Agra, India	Taj Mahal	Taj Mahal	The Taj Mahal is a mausoleum located in Agra, India, built by Mughal Emperor Shah Jahan in memory of his favorite wife, Mumtaz Mahal.

== Episode 6: Uzbekistan to Syria ==
#	Location	Treasure	Image	Brief description
41	Samarkand, Uzbekistan	Tiles of Samarkand	Gur-e Amir	Samarkand is the second-largest city in Uzbekistan and the capital of Samarqand Province. The use of tiles unifies Samarkand's great buildings, gives them distinct and powerful architectural character.
42	Bukhara, Uzbekistan	The trading domes	Trading dome, Bukhara	The trading domes were constructed between 1570 and 1590.
43	Baku, Azerbaijan	Fire Temple and Monastery at Surkhany	Fire temple	The Baku Ateshgah or "Fire Temple" is a castle-like religious structure in Surakhani, a suburb of greater Baku, Azerbaijan. The pentagonal complex, which has a courtyard surrounded by cells for monks and a tetrapillar-altar in the middle, was built during the 17th and 18th centuries.
44	Isfahan, Iran	Imam mosque in Naghsh-i Jahan Square	Interior of Naghsh-i Jahan Square mosque	The Imam Mosque or Shah Mosque is a mosque in Isfahan (Esfahān), Iran. Built during the Safavids period, it is an excellent example of Islamic architecture of Iran, and regarded as the masterpiece of Persian Architecture.
45	Shiraz, Iran	Persian rug	Persian rug	The Persian carpet is an essential part of Persian art and culture. Carpet-weaving is undoubtedly one of the most distinguished manifestations of Persian culture and art, and dates back to ancient Persia. The Persian carpet was highly sought after in Europe from at least the Middle Ages.
46	Kermanshah province, Iran	Behistun Inscription	Behistun Inscription	The "Rosetta Stone" of cuneiform, with inscriptions in Old Persian, Elamite, and Babylonian, deciphered in the 19th century.
47	Fars province, Iran	Persepolis	Persepolis	The ruins of the ancient Persian capital
48	Damascus, Syria	Al-Hamidiyah Souk	Al-Hamidiyah Souk	A market place in the ancient quarter

== Episode 7: Jordan to Ethiopia ==
#	Location	Treasure	Image	Brief description
49	Jordan	Petra	Treasurey of Petra	Ancient capital of the Nabataeans, rediscovered by Johann Ludwig Burckhardt in 1812.
50	Madaba, Jordan	Madaba Map	Madaba Map	6th-century floor mosaic; the oldest surviving original cartographic depiction of the Holy Land and especially Jerusalem.
51	Jerusalem, Israel	Temple Mount	Dome of the Rock in Temple Mount	Also known as Mount Moriah – the holiest site in Judaism; site of the 1st & 2nd temples. Also revered in Islam as the location of Muhammad's journey to Jerusalem and ascent to heaven; location of the al-Aqsa mosque and the Dome of the Rock, oldest extant Islamic structure in the world.
52	Axum, Ethiopia	Axum stelae	Axum Obelisk, Ethiopia	One of over a hundred obelisks in the ancient town of Axum, built 1700 years ago. The tallest of the stelae measures 24 metres and weighs over 100 tonnes, making it the oldest erected obelisk in the ancient world.
53	Debre Damo, Ethiopia	The Miracle of Mary	Debre Damo Church, Ethiopia	An ancient Ethiopian manuscript describing the numerous miracles of Mary, the mother of Jesus Christ, in Ethiopia's ancient Ge'ez language.
54	Lalibela, Ethiopia	Lalibela	Lalibela Church, Ethiopia	A complex of eleven rock-cut churches, believed to have been created in the 12th century. Ethiopian tradition states it was built with the help of angels.
55	Lalibela, Ethiopia	Lalibela cross	Lalibela Cross, Ethiopia	The Lalibela Cross is a large, elaborately decorated cross, considered one of Ethiopia's most precious religious and historical heirlooms. It is held by the Biete Medhane Alem, the House of the Redeemer of the World, a 12th-century rock-cut church in Lalibela. A priest may rub believers with the cross to bless them or heal them.

Cruickshank also visits Mount Nebo (Jordan) in this episode.

== Episode 8: Mali to Egypt ==
#	Location	Treasure	Image	Brief description
56	Djenné, Mali	Great Mosque of Djenné	Great Mosque of Djenné	The Great Mosque of Djenné is the largest mud brick or adobe building in the world and is considered by many architects to be the greatest achievement of the Sudano-Sahelian architectural style, albeit with definite Islamic influences.
57	Sanga, Mali	Dogon rock paintings	Circumcision Cave Painting	Some people say they date from the 13th century. Though, they are refreshed on a regular basis because the circumcision ceremony takes place every three years.
58	Sanga, Mali	Dogon mask		These masks are use during dance. They are sacred objects, too powerful for ordinary mortals to hold or even to know where they are kept.
59	Tripoli, Libya	Leptis Magna	Arch in Leptis Magna	Leptis Magna, also known as Lectis Magna (or Lepcis Magna as it is sometimes spelled), also called Lpqy or Neapolis, was a prominent city of the Roman Empire. Its ruins are located in Al Khums, Libya, 130 km east of Tripoli, on the coast where the Wadi Lebda meets the sea.
60	Gasr Al-Hajj, Libya	Berber granary Gasr Al-Hajj	Gasr Al-Hājj	It's a building created for storage and preservation of food. It's built from local materials like stone, gypsum, plaster.
61	Egypt	Great Pyramid of Giza	Great Pyramid of Giza	The Great Pyramid of Giza (also called the Pyramid of Khufu and the Pyramid of Cheops) is the oldest and largest of the three pyramids in the Giza Necropolis bordering what is now El Giza, Egypt, and in a historical irony is the oldest of the Seven Wonders of the Ancient World and the only one that survives substantially intact.
62	Cairo, Egypt	Tutankhamun's burial mask	Tutankhamun's mask	An incredible piece of work. Beautiful in detail and in form. On the front there is the image of the vulture and the cobra.
63	Edfu, Egypt	Edfu temple	Edfu temple	The Temple of Edfu is an ancient Egyptian temple located on the west bank of the Nile in the city of Edfu which was known in Greco-Roman times as Apollonopolis Magna, after the chief god Horus-Apollo. It is one of the best-preserved temples in Egypt. The temple, dedicated to the falcon god Horus, was built in the Ptolemaic period between 237 and 57 BCE.
64	Luxor, Egypt	Nefertari's tomb	Painting of Nefertari in the tomb	Nefertari's tomb is closed to the public. Inside it are the most beautiful and best preserved wall paintings ever discovered in Egypt. The images here tell the story of Nefertari's journey after death, to the Underworld and then to rebirth.

== Episode 9: Turkey to Germany ==
#	Location	Treasure	Image	Brief description
65	Cappadocia, Turkey	Derinkuyu Underground City	Rock architecture of Cappadocia	Derinkuyu Underground City is located in the homonymous Derinkuyu district in Nevşehir Province, Turkey. It is on the road between Nevşehir and Niğde, at a distance of 29 km from Nevşehir. It was opened for visitors as of 1969 and to date, only ten percent of the underground city is accessible for tourists. Its eight floors extend at a depth of approximately 85 m.
66	Istanbul, Turkey	Hagia Sophia	Hagia Sophia	Hagia Sophia is a former Orthodox patriarchal basilica, later a mosque, now a museum in Istanbul, Turkey. Famous in particular for its massive dome, it is considered the epitome of Byzantine architecture and to have "changed the history of architecture."
67	Moscow, Russia	Moscow Metro	Kievskaya station	The Moscow Metro, which spans almost the entire Russian capital, is the world's second most heavily used metro system. Opened in 1935, it is well known for the ornate design of many of its stations, which contain outstanding examples of socialist realist art.
68	Saint Petersburg, Russia	Cabin of Peter the Great	House of Peter the Great	The cabin of Peter the Great is a small wooden house which was the first St Petersburg "palace" of Tsar Peter the Great. The log cabin was constructed in three days in May 1703, by soldiers of the Semyonovskiy Regiment.
69	Solovki, Russia	Solovetsky Monastery	Solovetsky Monastery	Solovetsky Monastery was the greatest citadel of Christianity in the Russian North before being turned into a special Soviet prison and labor camp (1926–1939), which served as a prototype for the Gulag system.
70	Wieliczka, Poland	Wieliczka Salt Mine carvings	Chapel in the Wieliczka salt mine	The Wieliczka Salt Mine, located in the town of Wieliczka in southern Poland, lies within the Kraków metropolitan area. The mine had been in continuous operation, producing table salt since the 13th century until 2007 as one of the world's oldest operating salt mines (the oldest being in Bochnia, Poland, some 20 kilometers away from Wieliczka).
71	Berlin, Germany	Volkswagen Beetle	Volkswagen Beetle	The Volkswagen Beetle, also known as the Volkswagen Type 1, was an economy car produced by the German auto maker Volkswagen (VW) from 1938 until 2003. It used an air cooled rear engined rear wheel drive (RR layout).
72	Dessau, Germany	The Brno Chair at the Bauhaus	a Brno Chair	The Brno chair (model number MR50) is a modernist cantilever chair designed by Ludwig Mies van der Rohe in 1929–1930 for the bedroom of the Tugendhat House in Brno, Czech Republic.

== Episode 10: Bosnia to France and Home ==
#	Location	Treasure	Image	Brief description
73	Mostar, Bosnia and Herzegovina	Stari most	Stari most	Reconstructed 16th Century bridge in the Bosnian city of Mostar. It was commissioned by Suleiman the Magnificent and was the height of technical achievement when it was built.
74	Athens, Greece	Parthenon	Parthenon	5th century BC Temple to Athena is the main building on the Acropolis in Athens. Its ruinous state had a huge impact on the Romantic movement.
75	Rome, Italy	Pantheon	Pantheon	Temple to all the Gods in central Rome. Its dome is one of the largest and oldest in the world.
76	Florence, Italy	Medici Chapels	Medici Chapel	Chapel designed by Michelangelo for the Medici family who were the most powerful Florentine family during the Renaissance
77	Venice, Italy	Grand Canal	Grand Canal of Venice	The most important canal in Venice, lined by many of the city's most beautiful buildings
78	Madrid, Spain	Guernica		Painting by Pablo Picasso; a reaction to Nationalist troops and their allies bombing of the Basque town of Guernica during the Spanish Civil War
79	Granada, Spain	Alhambra	Court of the Lions	A palace in the Spanish city of Granada, regarded as one of the finest pieces of Islamic architecture
80	Chartres, France	Cathedral of Chartres	Cathedral of Chartres	One of the finest Gothic cathedrals, especially noted for its Stained glass

== Companion book ==
- Cruickshank, Dan (17 February 2005). Around the World in Eighty Treasures. Weidenfeld & Nicolson (hardback). ISBN 978-0-297-84399-3.
- Cruickshank, Dan (6 October 2005). Around the World in Eighty Treasures. Phoenix Press (paperback). ISBN 978-0-7538-1947-0.
