= Weissenhof chair =

Chair designed by Ludwig Mies van der Rohe

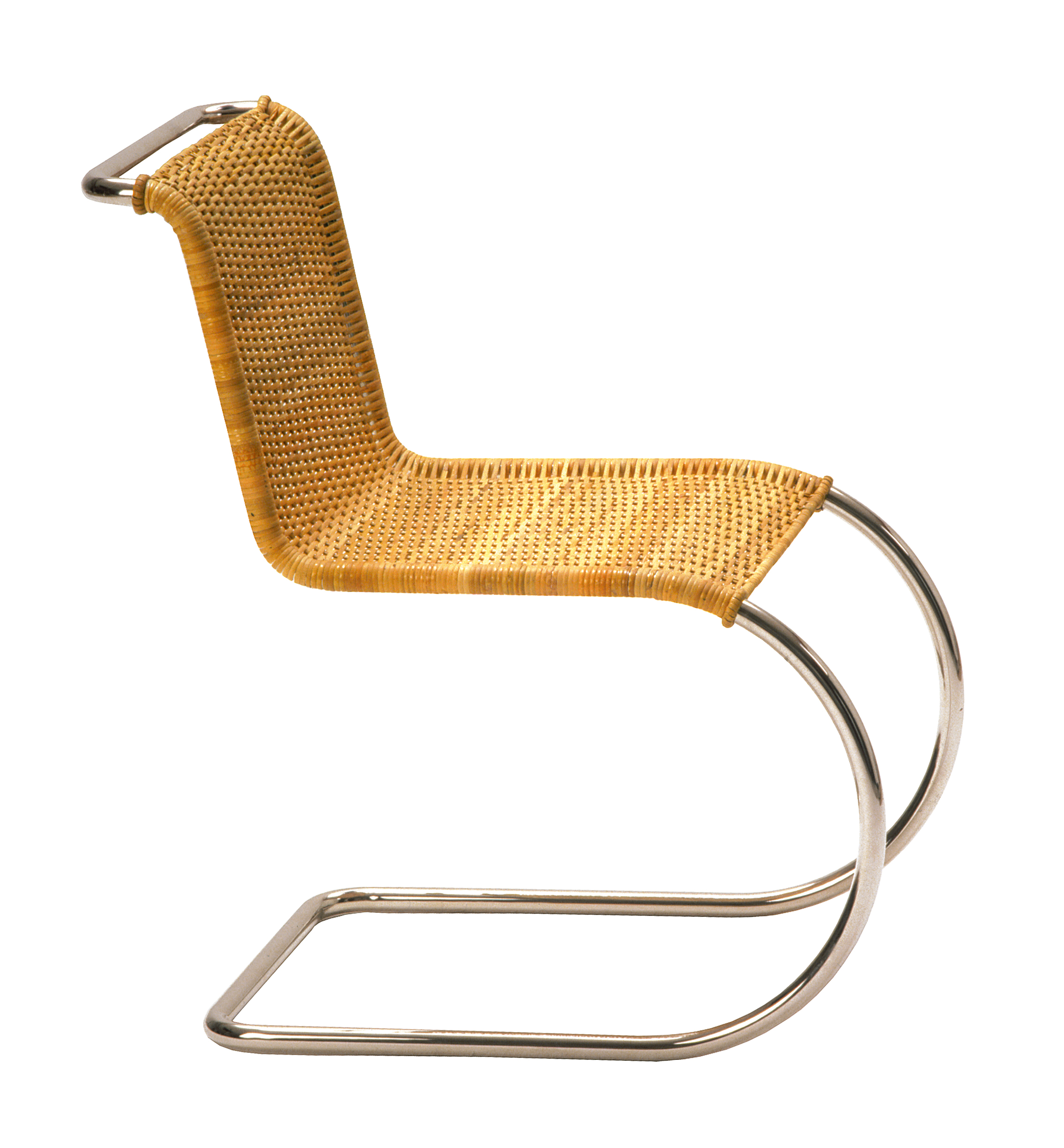
Weissenhof chair (1927)

The Weissenhof chair (also called MR 10 or MR 20) is a chair designed by the German architect and designer Ludwig Mies van der Rohe, in 1927. This first, springy cantilever chair was shown at the Weissenhofsiedlung Exhibition in 1927. It was made of a 25 mm steel tube and had a wicker seat and backrest proposed by Lilly Reich. The MR20 version has armrests.

== History ==
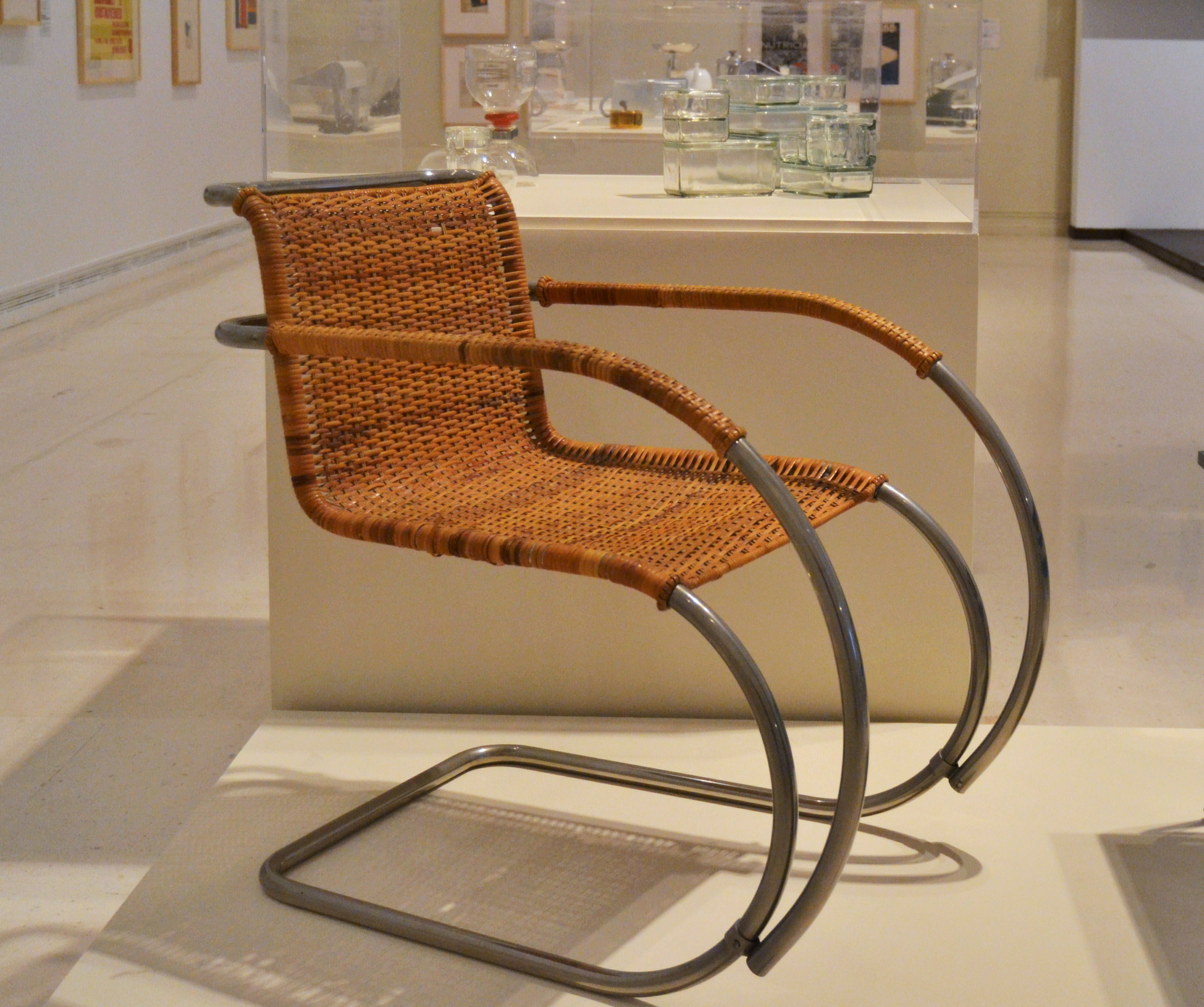
Weissenhof chair, with armrests (1927)

The first designs of this chair were influenced by Mart Stam's gas tube chair, which, as the first chair without back legs, was the forerunner of all cantilever chairs. The designer Sergius Ruegenberg, who worked in Mies van der Rohe's office at the time, described the creation of the Weissenhof chair in 1985: "Mies came back from Stuttgart in November 1926 and talked about Mart Stam and his idea for the chair. We had a drawing board on the wall, and Mies drew the Stam chair on it, right-angled, starting from the top. He also added the sleeves and said: 'Ugly, so ugly with those sleeves. If he had at least rounded it off - that would be nicer' and sketched an arc. – Just a bow from his hand on the Stam sketch made up the new chair."

A couple of these chairs were also part of the equipment in the Villa Tugendhat (1929) and in the Farnsworth house.
