= Chrifa =

Former Norwegian iron-bed and furniture manufacturer

- Type: Aksjeselskap
- Industry: Furniture
- Founded: 1904
- Defunct: 2001
- Fate: Acquired by Jacsy; production moved to Sweden
- Headquarters: Oslo, Norway
- Products: Iron beds, tubular-steel furniture, hospital beds

Christiania Jernseng- og Jernvarefabrik (Norwegian: The Christiania Iron Bed and Hardware Factory) was a Norwegian producer of iron beds and furniture that also ran a mechanical workshop. Founded in 1904 in Oslo, it originally made hospital beds, ship beds, and similar equipment. Working with architects and designers, it also made tubular-steel furniture for private use, including the Folkestolen cantilever chair by Herman Munthe-Kaas, launched in 1930. From the 1930s the company used the name Chrifa.

With support from the Regional Development Fund, a new factory was built in Nissedal Municipality in Telemark in 1974, and production moved there from Oslo. In 1995 Chrifa was taken over by the Sauda-based aids manufacturer Jacsy, both companies making hospital beds, and in 1998 Jacsy became a subsidiary of Møller Industrier. In 2001 it was decided to move bed production to Sweden, and the Nissedal factory has since been used for various industrial purposes.
