= Brno chair =

Modernist cantilever chair

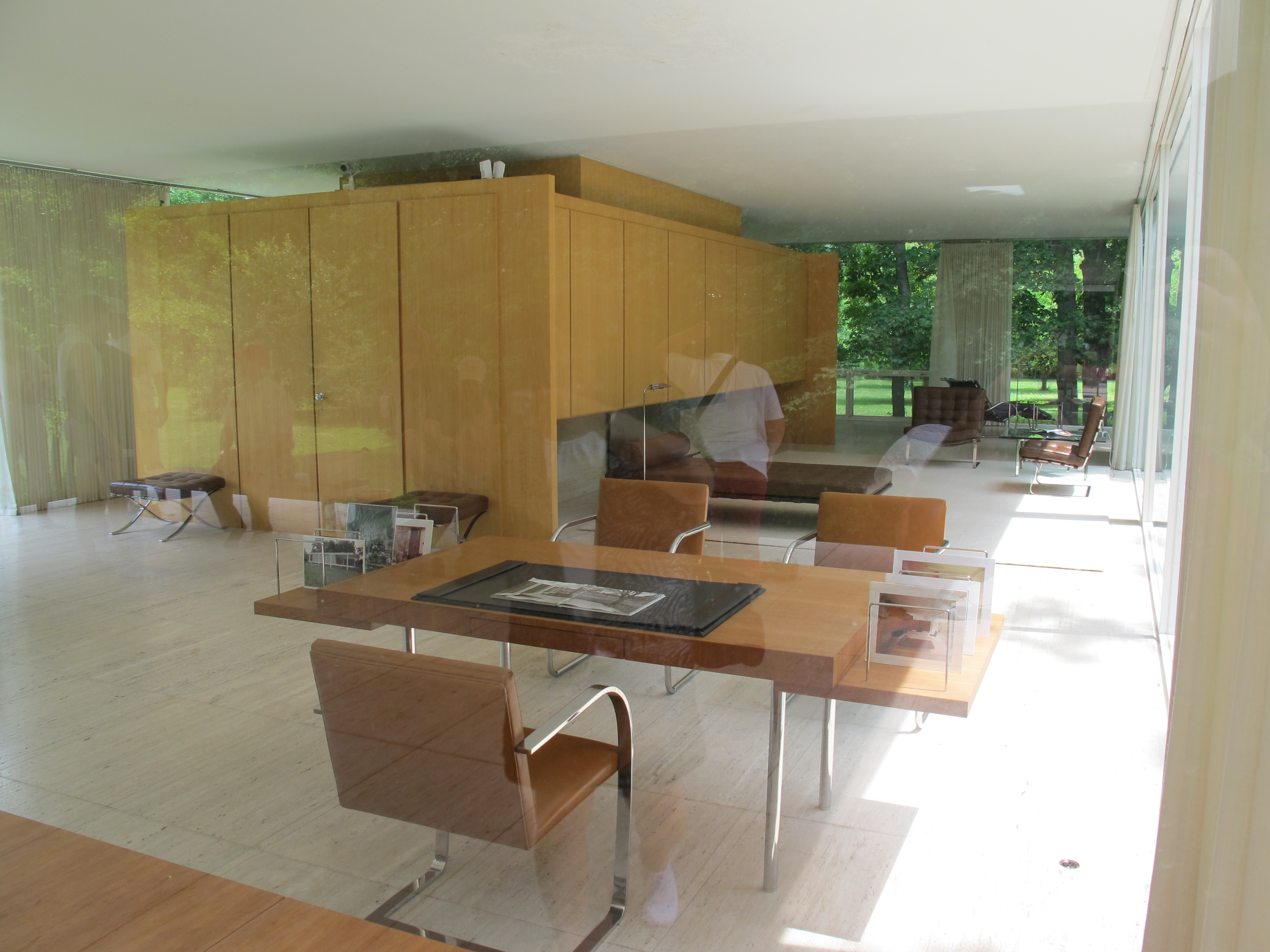
The Brno chair shown in the foreground at Mies's Farnsworth House

The Brno chair (model number MR50) is a modernist cantilever chair designed by Ludwig Mies van der Rohe and Lilly Reich in 1929-1930 for the bedroom of the Tugendhat House in Brno, Czech Republic. The design was based on similar chairs created by Mies van der Rohe working with Lilly Reich, such as the MR20 chair with wicker seat from 1927; all building on earlier designs of Mart Stam.

The Brno chair has become a modern furniture classic. It has very clean lines, consisting of a steel frame in a single piece, bent into a C-shape from the middle of the back, round past the front edge of the seat (to create arms), and back under the seat to create a cantilever, with taut seat and back upholstered in leather. There are two versions of the chair, one in tubular steel and the other in flat steel. The metal was originally polished stainless steel; some modern examples are chrome-plated plain steel.

The Brno chair was selected by Dan Cruickshank as one of his 80 manufactured "treasures" in the 2005 BBC series, Around the World in 80 Treasures.

== See also ==
- Barcelona chair
- Tugendhat chair
