= Kreuzschwinger =

Furniture designed by Till Behrens

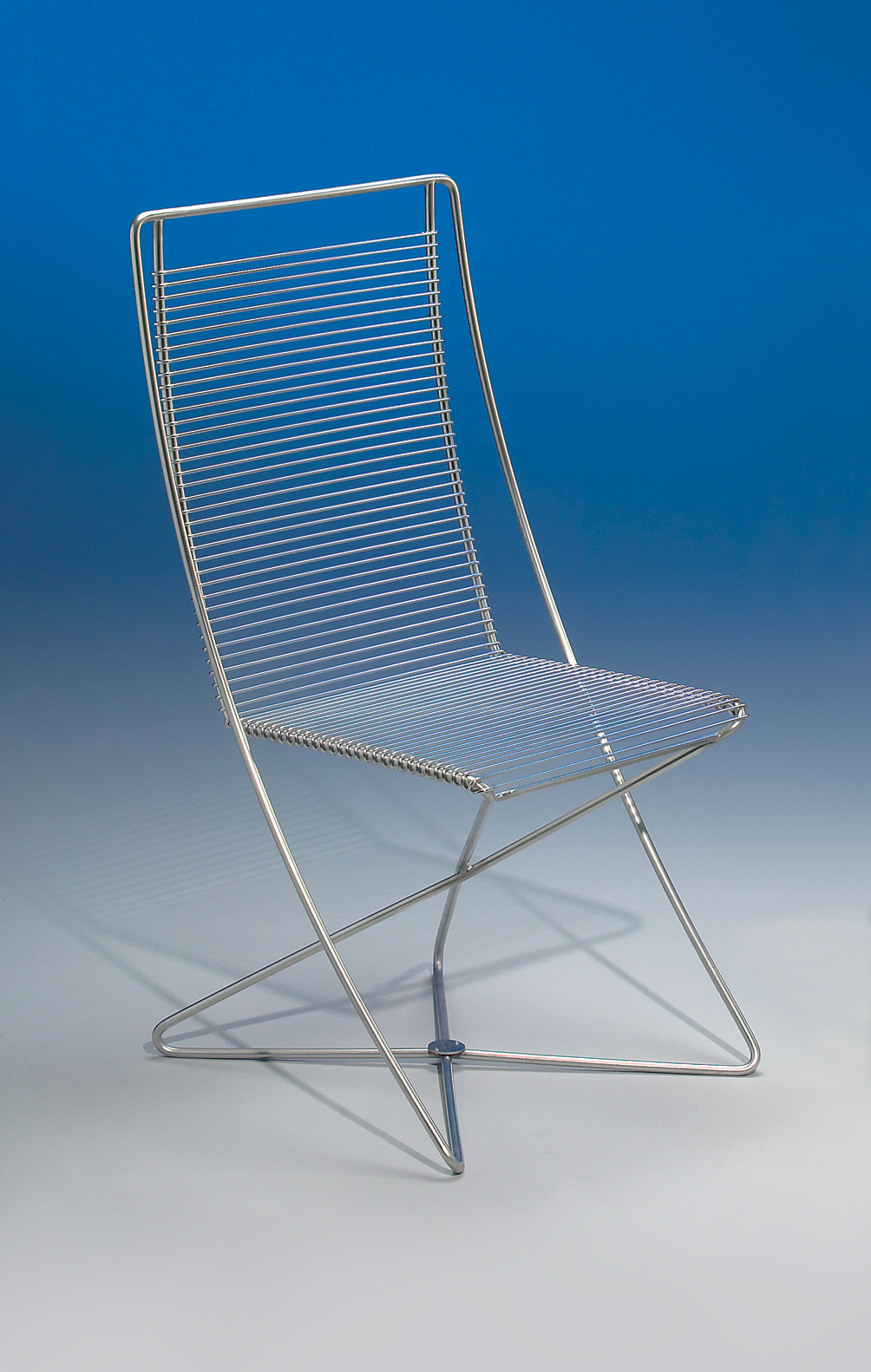
Kreuzschwinger by Till Behrens (1950s / 2004)

Kreuzschwinger are seating or lounging furniture. They were invented by the German architect and industrial designer Till Behrens in the 1950s.

== Construction ==
Kreuzschwinger are made out of stainless steel that swing gently back and forth without mechanical help. They automatically adapt to posture changes. Kreuzschwinger are often wrongly assigned to the Cantilever chair

== Collections (Selection) ==
Sources:

- Museum für Angewandte Kunst Frankfurt
- Deutsches Architekturmuseum
- Museum für Kunst und Gewerbe Hamburg
- Badisches Landesmuseum
- Fridericianum
- Die Neue Sammlung
- Vitra Design Museum
- Museum für angewandte Kunst Wien
- Deutsches Technikmuseum Berlin
- Germanisches Nationalmuseum
- Stiftung Simonshof
- Stiftung Schleswig-Holsteinische Landesmuseen

== Exhibitions / Awards (Selection) ==
Sources:

- 1986: design center Stuttgart
- 1986: Haus Industriereform Essen
- 1987: design center Stuttgart
- 1987: Haus Industriereform Essen
- 1994: Deutscher Designer Club
- 1995: Designpreis für Langlebigkeit, Stuttgart
- 1996: Busse Longlife Design Award
- 1996: "Dynamisches Sitzen" in "Institut für Neue Technische Form", Darmstadt
- 1997: Internationaler Designpreis Baden-Württemberg
- 2008: Busse Longlife Design Award
- 2008: "Flexible Kreuze" in Museum für Angewandte Kunst Frankfurt

== Books ==
- Fiell, Ch. & P. "1000 Chairs", Cologne 1997
- Akira Kido "Art of tasteful furnishings" Japan 2003
- Aktion Plagiarius (Editor) "Kreuzschwinger® - Dynamisches Sitzen / Dynamic Seating", Berlin 2008
