= W. H. Gispen =

Dutch industrial designer (1890–1981)

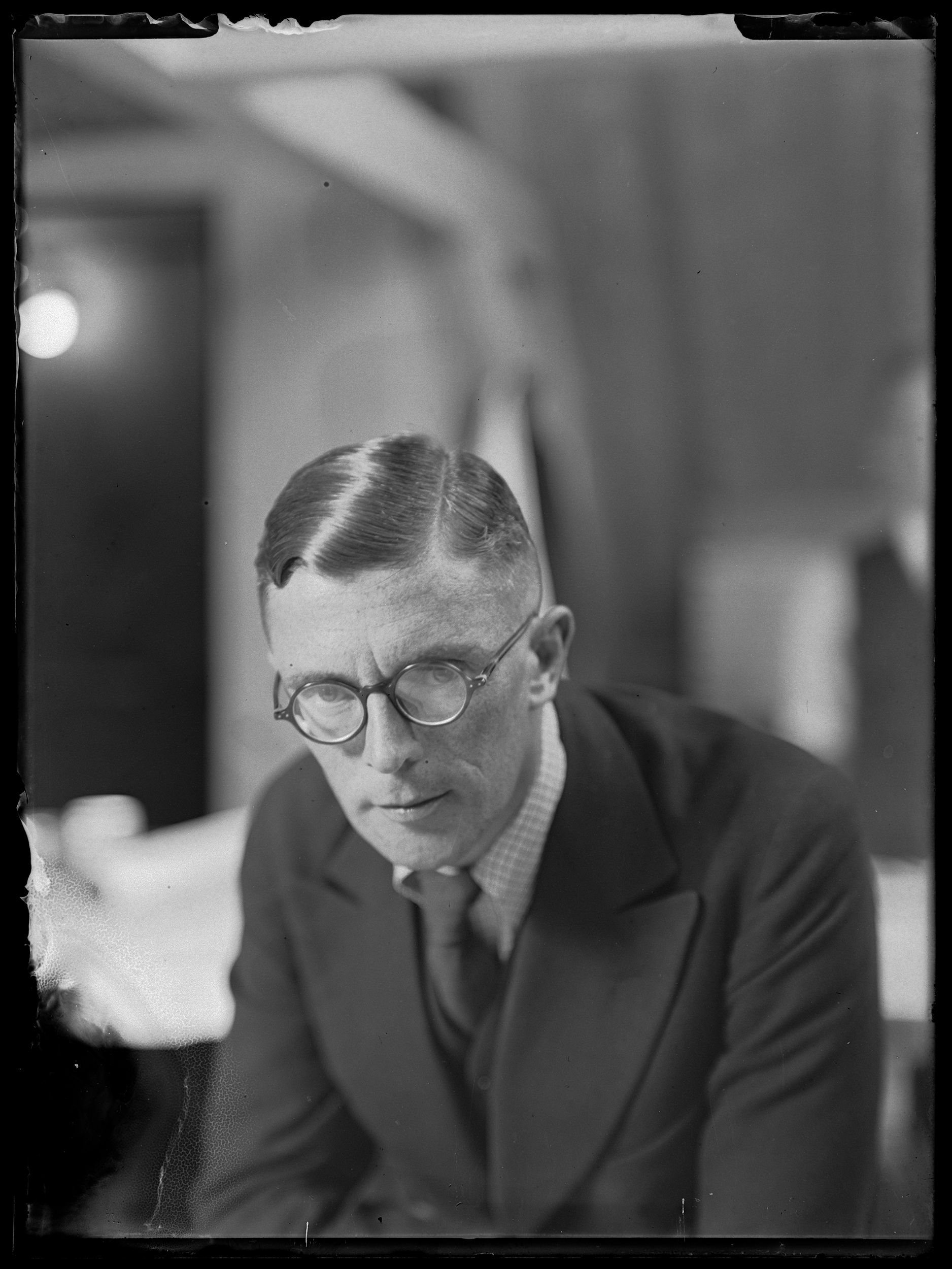
W.H. Gispen

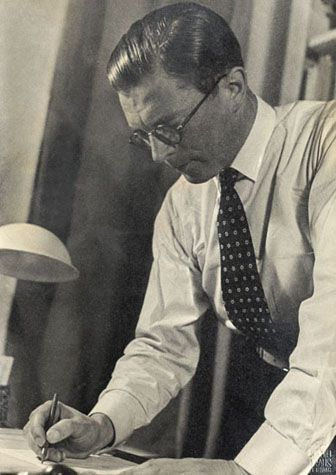
Willem Hendrik Gispen

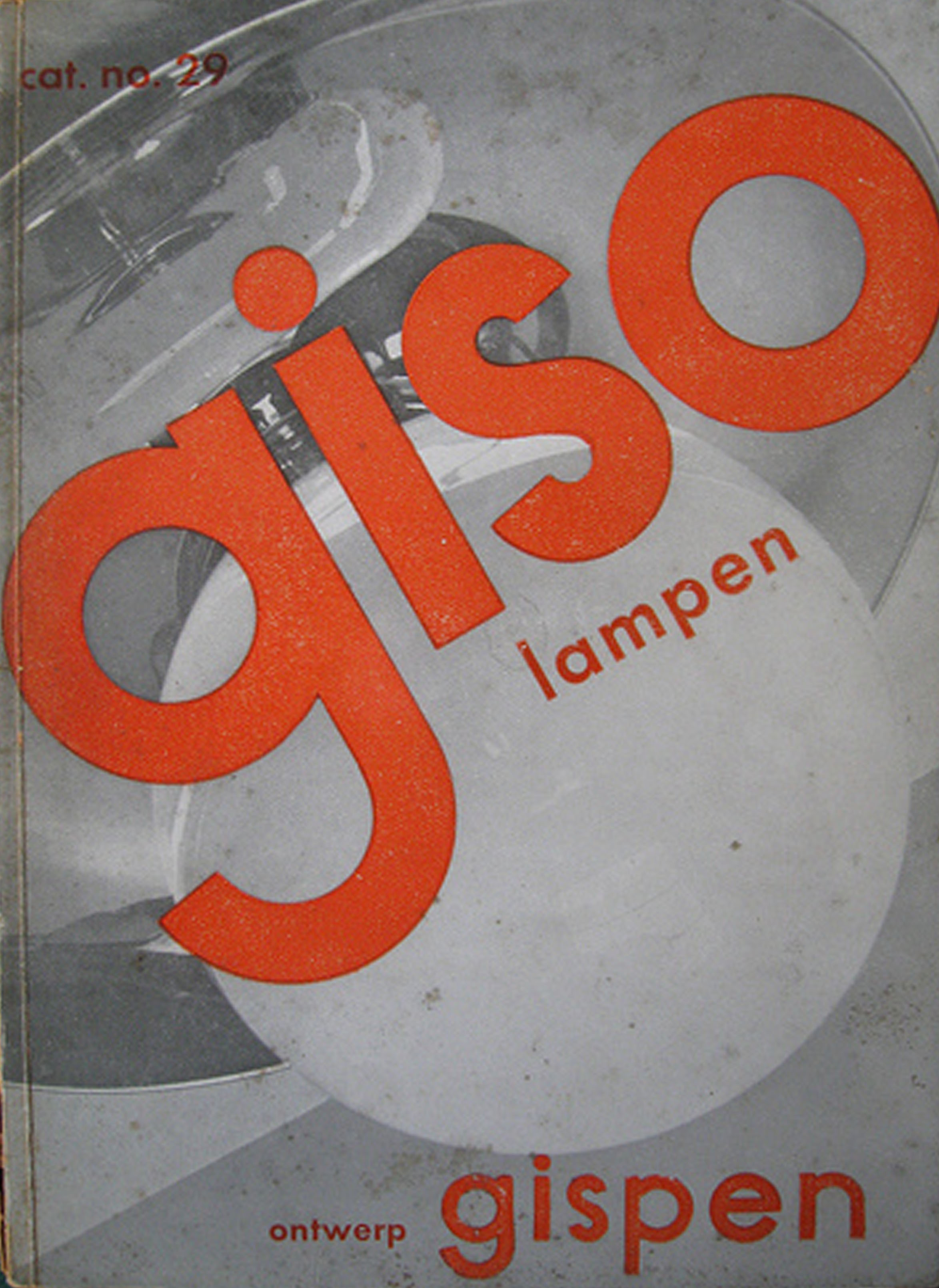
Cover for Gispen Giso lampen catalogue no. 29, designed by W.H. Gispen (1933).

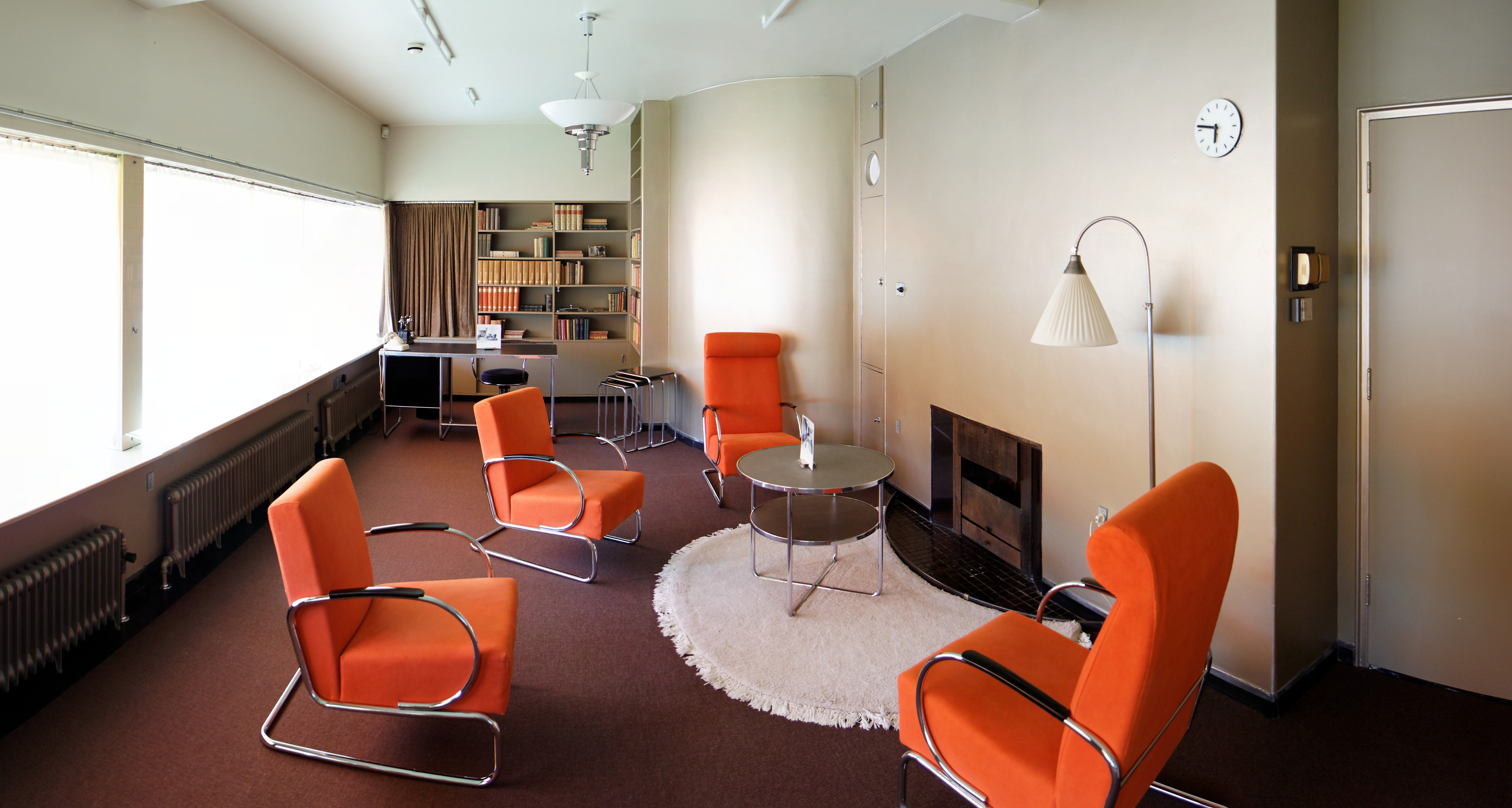
Huis Sonneveld Library, Rotterdam (1933). Architecture by Brinkman and Van der Vlugt. Whole interior by W.H. Gispen.

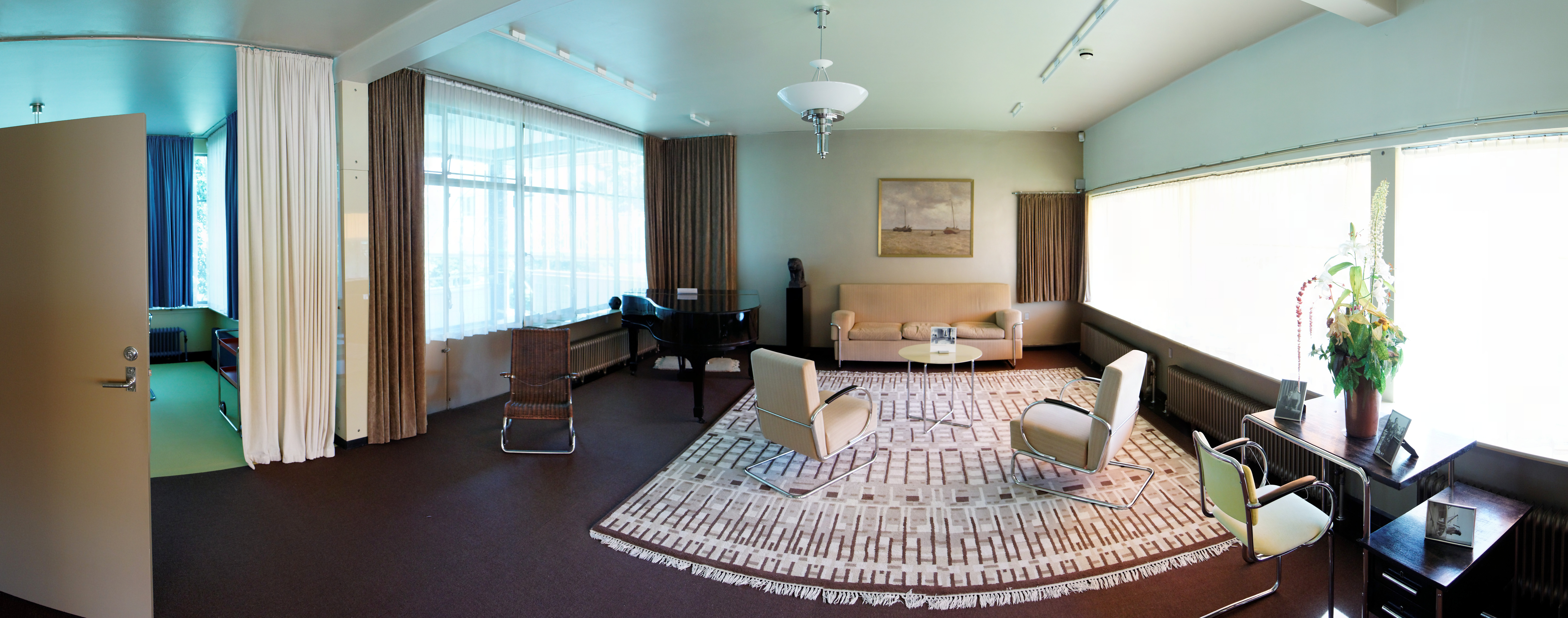
Huis Sonneveld sitting room, Rotterdam (1933). Architecture by Brinkman and Van der Vlugt. Whole interior by W.H. Gispen.

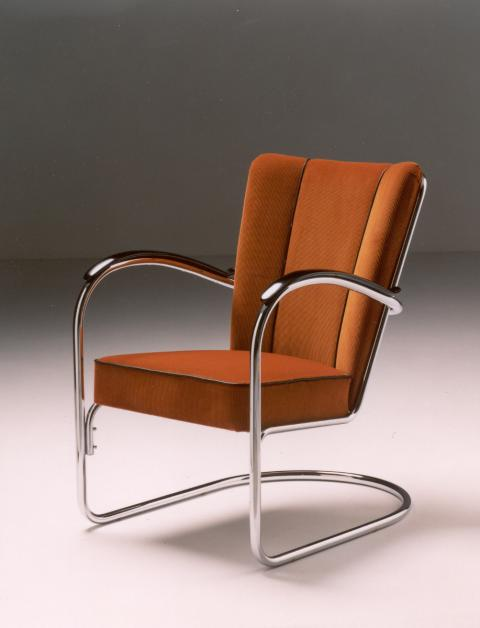
Gispen model 412, with red corduroy, produced from 1934 to 1966.

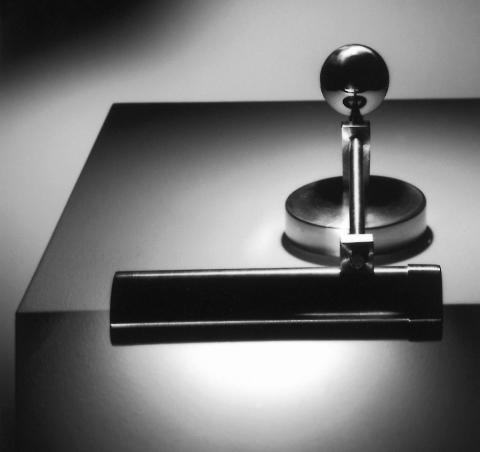
The Pianolamp, Giso 404, designed by W.H. Gispen and J.J.P. Oud (1927)

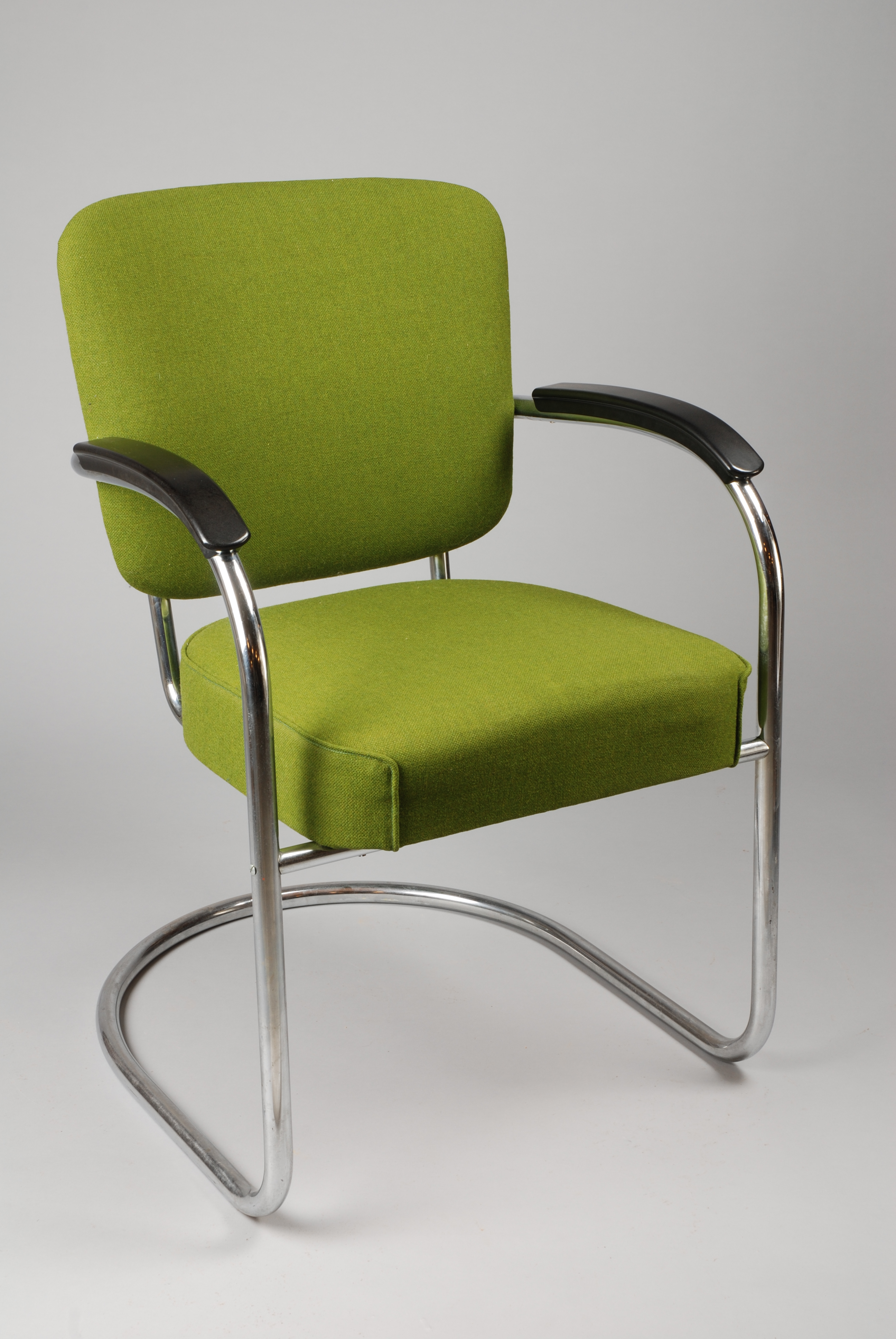
Gispen armchair

Willem Hendrik Gispen (7 December 1890, in Amsterdam – 10 May 1981, in The Hague) was a Dutch industrial designer, best known for his Giso lamps and serially produced functionalist steel-tube furniture.

He studied design at the Academy for Visual Arts and Technical Science in Rotterdam (Academie van Beeldende Kunsten en Technische Wetenschappen) at the architecture department. He started in 1913, but left the Academy in 1915 partly due to the outbreak of the First World War. In April 1918 he married Anna C.J. Gisolf in Rotterdam. In 1916 he purchased a small smithy, which he would develop and extend to the well-known Gispen’s Factory for Metalwork (Gispen’s fabriek voor metaalbewerking n.v.). The success of the company was to a great extent based upon the qualities of Willem Hendrik Gispen as an industrial designer, designing many artistically en technically qualitative lamps and furniture. Many of these serial produced designs, like armchair no. 412, still belong to the highlights of Dutch design. With his Giso lamp-designs from the 1920s and 1930s he was a part of the international avant-garde interested in light innovations. The same can be said of his steel-tube chairs and furniture, with Ludwig Mies van der Rohe, Mart Stam and Gerrit Rietveld among his inspirations.

In 1949 W.H. Gispen left the firm, after which he worked for other furniture manufactories like Kembo. In 1981 the Stedelijk Museum in Amsterdam organized the first exposition about W.H. Gispen, dedicated to his lamp-designs from the years 1916-1949. It was the same year W.H. Gispen died on 10 May.

== W.H. Gispen and the firm ==
Willem Hendrik Gispen grew up in Amsterdam and Utrecht. He was educated to be a primary school teacher and also acquired a teaching certificate in French. He decided in 1913 to study design at the Academy for Visual Arts and Technical Science in Rotterdam. At the academy he became acquainted with a number of people who would cooperate with him at a later date, like architect L.C. van der Vlugt and designer Ch. Hoffmann. After dropping the course in 1915, he worked voluntarily for one of his previous teachers. In 1916 he purchased a small smithy at the Coolschestraat in Rotterdam, where he started his own workshop in September 1916.

In the early years, Gispen’s designs were much in line with the expressionism of the Amsterdamse School and the Art Nouveau. Besides ornamental wrought-iron work, Gispen produced things like firesides, lamps, wooden furniture and clocks. Gispen also designed his own advertisements. In 1919 the workshop moved to the Voorhaven in Rotterdam Delfshaven. In the same year the new company name was introduced: Gispen’s fabriek voor metaalbewerking. In 1920 he co-founded architects’ circle Opbouw, whose discussions founded the base of Dutch functionalism. In the following years Gispen successfully experimented with quantity production of small cast brass lamps and bronze window and door profiles.

From 1923 onwards Gispen comes into (in)direct contact with multiple inspirational sources: the ideas of the Bauhaus through architect J.J.P. Oud, the style of Hermann Muthesius of the Deutsche Werkbund and the principles of the artists of De Stijl. These inspirations became reality in several large commissions. In 1925, at the international exhibition of Decorative and Industrial Arts in Paris, not only did Gispen receive a medal for his ornamental iron-work, he also became acquainted with Le Corbusier, Constructivism and other French modernists.

In 1926 Gispen put his Giso lamps on the market, which were designed on the basis of the demands of Scientific Lighting, aesthetics and economics. He placed himself in the designers’ vanguard by participating in the exhibition die Wohnung in Stuttgart, organized by the Deutsche Werkbund in 1927. Both in Oud’s dwelling-row in the Weissenhofsiedlung and in the exhibition-hall in Stuttgart there hung Giso lamps. Gispen became inspired by objects such as the cantilever chairs of Mart Stam and Ludwig Mies van der Rohe. In November 1927, Gispen presented his first tubular steel chair at De Rotterdamsche Kring. In 1928 the factory took the piano lamp designed for H.H. Kamerlingh Onnes by Gispen and Oud in serial production as the Giso 404, and achieved widespread recognition with it.

Gispen opened showrooms in Amsterdam, Rotterdam, Brussels and later in London, Paris and other cities abroad. Gispen’s wide reputation was also a result of active marketing. Leading representatives of the "New" Photography and Typography of the 1920s, such as Jan Kamman and Paul Schuitema, designed the product catalogs and other advertising material. Despite their success, the firm was threatened with bankruptcy as a consequence of the Wall Street Krach. The naval architect W. van Osselen was appointed as co-director during a reorganisation. Van Osselen steered the firm in producing steel office furniture (starting with the Stalachrome-series), while W.H. Gispen himself remained focused on the home, balancing between functionalism and a ‘weakened’, ‘cosy’ version of it.

In the ‘30s, Thonet-Nederland summoned Gispen to court on account of breach of authorship of Mart Stam on the cantilever chair. According to the judge, because no patent was applied for, the ‘Stam’-chair enjoyed no legal protection. Gispen now tried to fight the patent granted to Mies van der Rohe on his well-known cantilever chair. The trial dragged itself on, which only stopped when Mies’s patent ran out.

During the Second World War metalwork was prohibited outside the war industry, so the factory began producing parts for the aircraft-industry. Gispen himself was put in prison in Scheveningen because he had co-signed a letter of protest against the Kulturkammer. After the war, Gispen found himself on more artistic grounds with painting and tensions between him and co-director Van Osselen grew.

In 1949 W.H. Gispen resigned. He remained active in the design related field, with several publications in the magazine Goed Wonen, lecturing at the Royal Academy in The Hague, co-founding the Kembo-factory in 1953 and so on. He also became more interested in designing architecture and at the age of seventy-nine he took up etching-lessons at the Royal Academy. He died on 10 May 1981.

Gispen’s fabriek voor metaalbewerking still exists as Gispen International BV, producing mostly office furniture and high-end design furniture for the home, including some of the classics of W.H. Gispen himself. They also have a foundation, called Stichting Gispen Collectie, which takes care of the Gispen collections, preserving it, expanding it and informing the Dutch people about this piece of Dutch history.
