= Giso 404 =

The Giso 404 is a metal piano lamp designed in 1927 by Jacobus Johannes Pieter Oud, manufactured by the Dutch Gispen firm.

== Design ==
The light fixture was designed by J.J.P. Oud as a unique wedding gift for Dutch painter and ceramist Harm Kamerlingh Onnes and his wife Titia Easton. Its asymmetrical, cantilevered design makes it suitable to be used on top of a piano, illuminating the keyboard and sheet music. The fixture consists of a cylindrical metal tube which contains the lamp, attached to a thin shaft mounted on a flat round base. A spherical counterweight at the other side of the shaft provides balance. The sphere is executed in shiny metal, while the rest of the lamp has a matte metal surface. The whole fixture is 10.6 cm high, 19.5 cm wide and 28.5 cm long.

With its simple and very functional forms, the lamp looks like a small abstract sculpture. It is inspired by the avant-garde art movement De Stijl, of which Oud was a member till 1922, and by the geometric forms used by the Bauhaus. In this sense, it is slightly related to Gerrit Rietveld's table lamp from 1925, but the fixture designed by Oud is more dramatic in terms of balance and asymmetry.

== Manufacturing ==
For the actual construction of the lamp, Oud turned to the manufacturing firm of Willem Hendrik Gispen. The latter may have provided some creative input in the construction of the lamp, but this is not certain, as no design or construction drawings remain. Gispen may have felt intellectual ownership of the design, as he took the lamp into mass production by his firm in 1928. J.J.P. Oud was not consulted about this and felt indignated, but he did not sue Gispen; both men remained friends. Gispen named the lamp Giso 404.

Materials, size and execution of the lamp varied slightly throughout the years and it received different names (Giso 5011 in 1936, Giso 5201 in 1939). The asymmetry of the design was mirrored in 1939 and from that date the lamp also had a push-button switch in its foot.

== Reception ==
Although most Gispen designs were mainly influential and popular in the Netherlands and not so much abroad, the Giso 404 is part of many museum collections worldwide – including the MoMA, Cooper Hewitt, Metropolitan Museum of Art, and the Dutch Museum Boijmans Van Beuningen and Gemeentemuseum Den Haag.
