= Gasr Al-Hajj =

Coordinates: 32°2′40.42″N 12°9′53.21″E

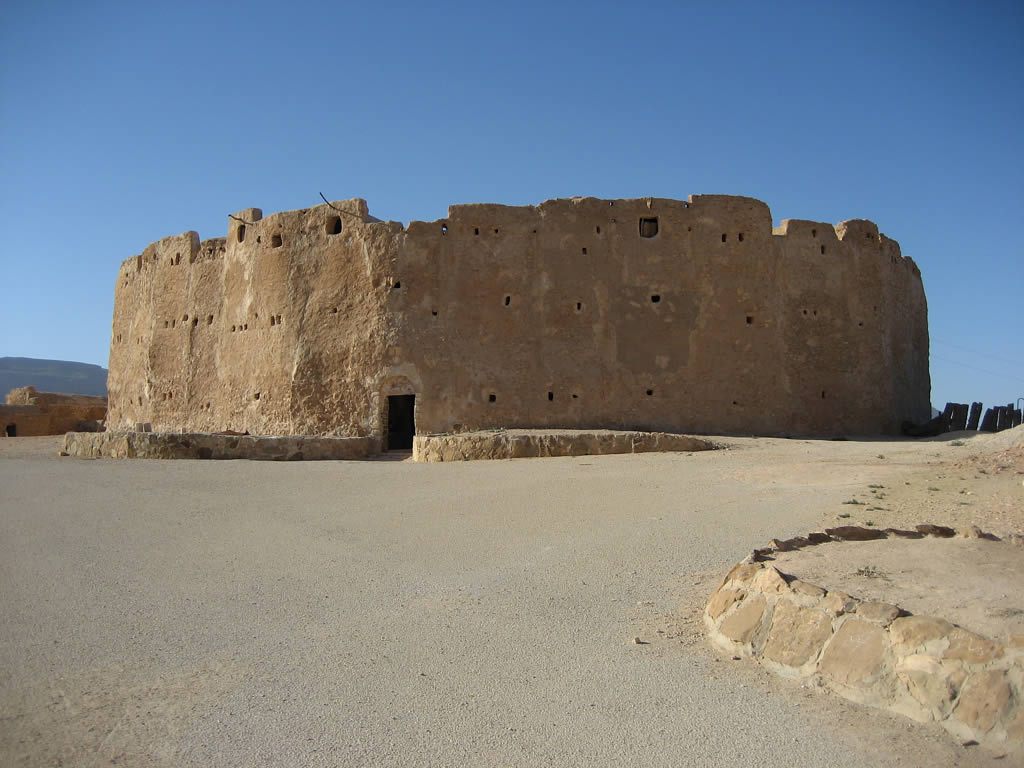
Gasr Al-Hājj

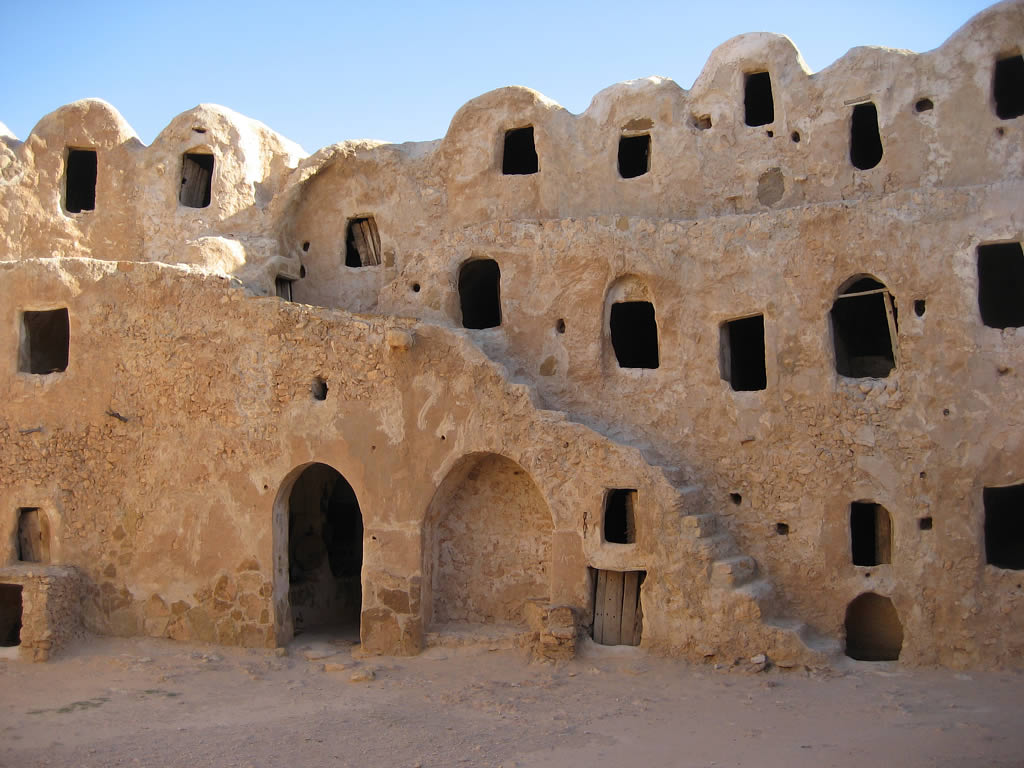
Inside view

Gasr Al-Hājj (Arabic: قصر الحاج) is a huge fortified granary of circular shape built in the 7th century AH/13th century AD by Abdallah Abu Jatla (Arabic:عبدالله أبوجطلة). It is located in Libya on the Tripoli-'Aziziya-Al Jawf route in Libya about 130 km from Tripoli. It was built to serve as granary for families from the surrounding area in return for quarter of their crops, which, it is said, the owner had endowed as a waqf for teaching Qur'an and Islamic related subjects to the people of the area. The building originally comprised 114 chambers, which could be the number of the subscribing families during the time of construction. It is also speculated that the number 114 was used symbolically to reflect the number of Sura in the Qur'an, a view widely accepted by villagers in the region nowadays. The number of chambers as of now, is 119, as result of splitting 10 chambers due to inheritance disputes. Other changes include the addition of 29 cellars.
