= Lilly Reich =

German designer (1885–1947)

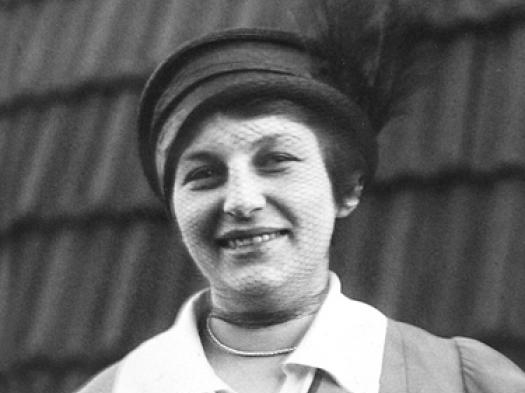
- Lilly Reich
- Born: Lilly Reich; 16 June 1885; Berlin, German Empire
- Died: 14 December 1947 (aged 62); Berlin, Allied-occupied Germany
- Notable work: Barcelona Chair; Barcelona Pavilion; Brno Chair; Weissenhof chair

Lilly Reich (16 June 1885 – 14 December 1947) was a German designer specializing in textiles, furniture, interiors, and exhibition spaces. She was a close collaborator with Ludwig Mies van der Rohe for more than ten years during the Weimar period from 1925 until his emigration to the U.S. in 1938. Reich was an important figure in the early Modern Movement in architecture and design. Her fame was posthumous, as the significance of her contribution to the work of Mies van der Rohe and others with whom she collaborated only became clear through the research of later historians of the field.

== Early life and education ==
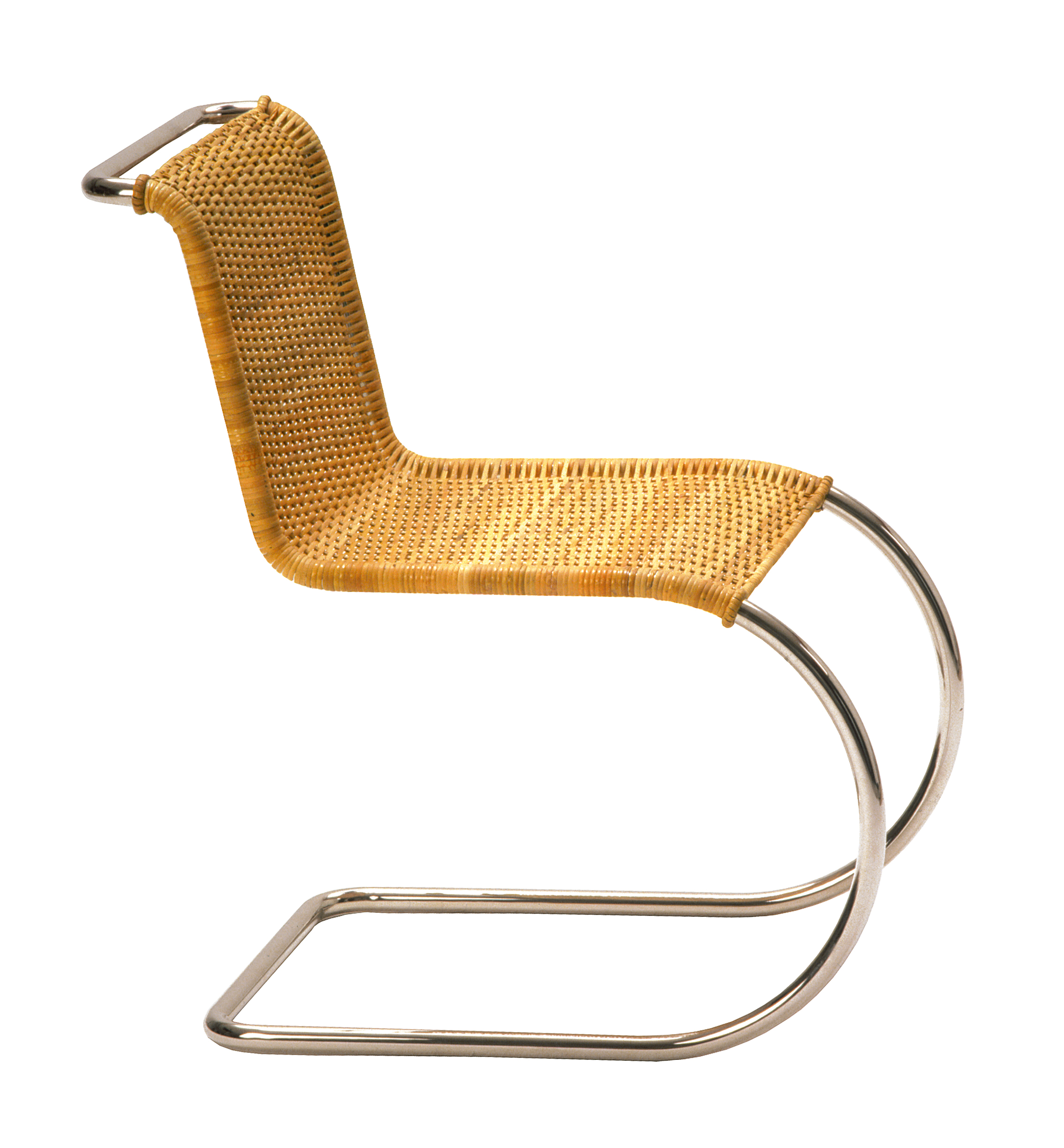
MR 10 Weissenhof chair, designed by Reich and Mies van der Rohe (1927)

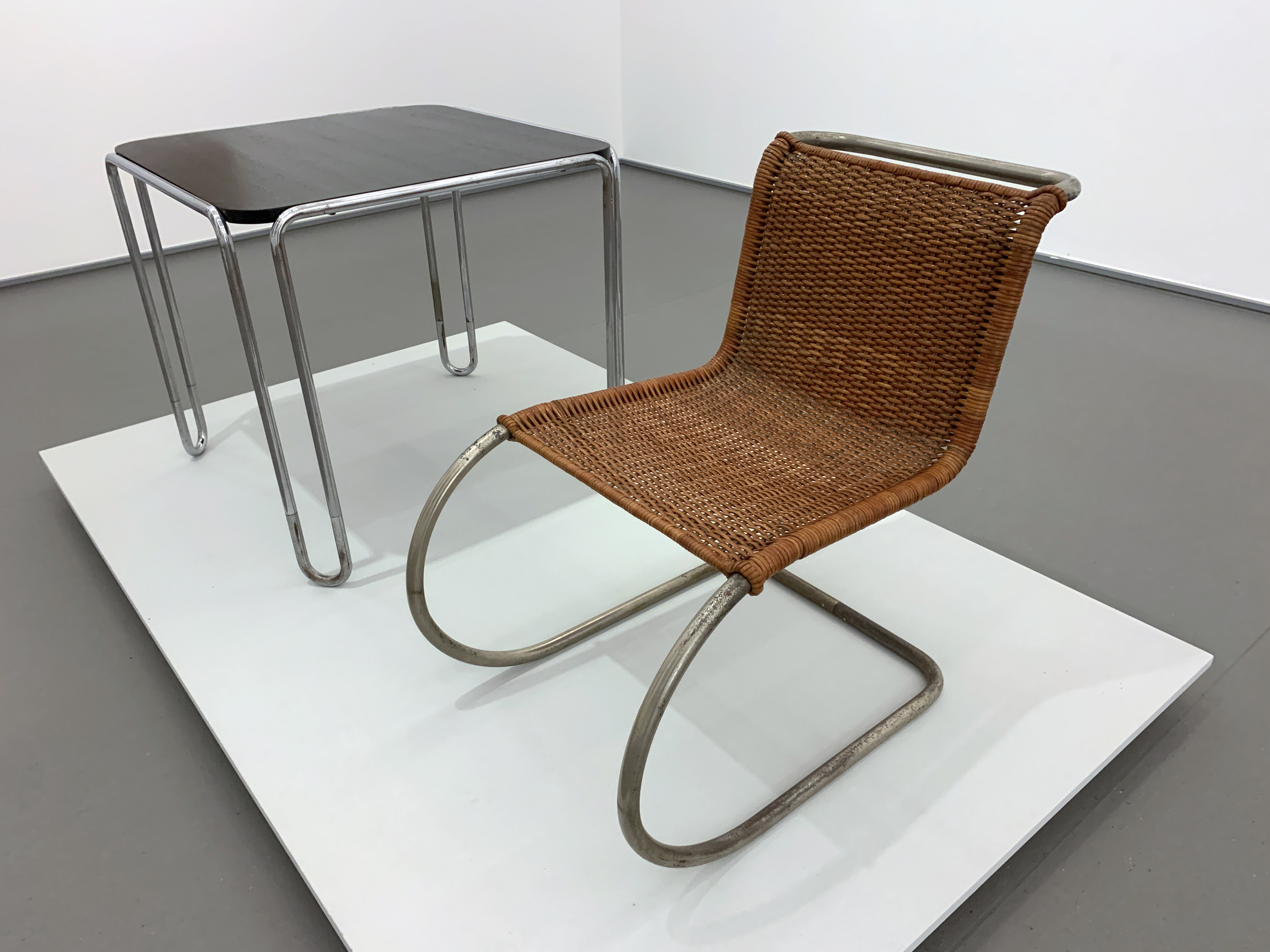
MR 10 chair and B 10 table, Kunstmuseen Krefeld

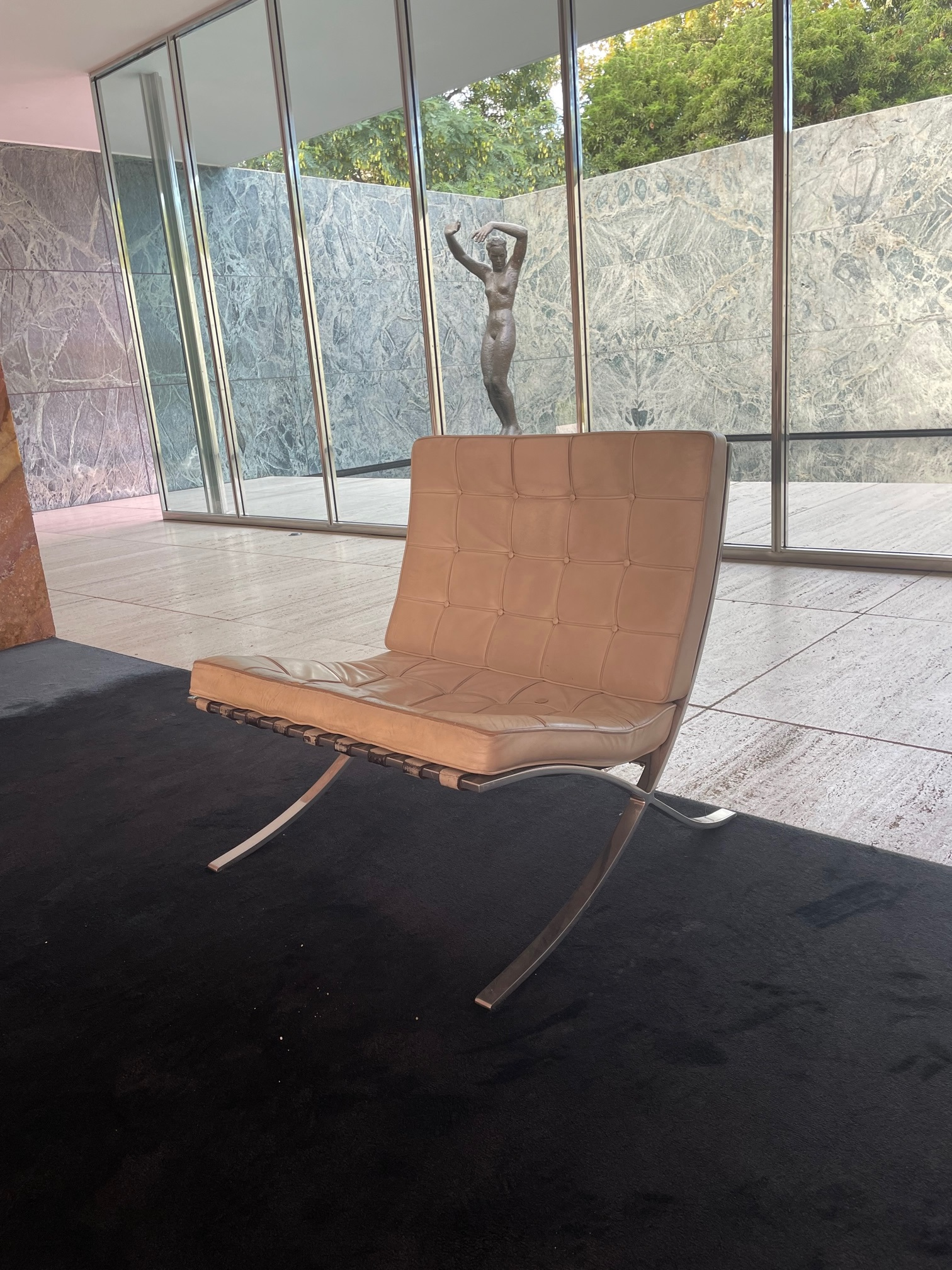
Barcelona Chair (1929) photographed in situ at the reconstructed Barcelona Pavilion

Reich was born in Berlin on 16 June 1885.

In 1908, age 23, she put her embroidery training to use when she went to Vienna to work for the Wiener Werkstätte (Vienna Workshop) of Josef Hoffmann, a visual arts production company of designers, artists, and architects. Hoffmann was a celebrated modernist designer, responsible for designs such as the Kubus chair (1918), Cabinet (c. 1915), Koller (1911), and Broncia (1912) chairs. Reich worked with Hoffmann on the design of the Kubus armchair and sofa.

== Career ==
Reich returned to Berlin by 1911. There she began to design furniture, textiles and women's clothes. This experience was to be formative for her, giving her a particular interest in contrasting textures and materials, as well as specific skills with regard to the use of textiles in furniture. She also worked as a shop window decorator at this time.

In 1911, after working for many of Berlin's most fashionable department stores, Reich designed store windows and clothing installations for Wertheim Department Store of Berlin. In 1912, two crucial events helped establish her reputation as an influential designer and exhibition organizer. First, she designed well-received interiors for a worker's apartment and two stores for the Lyzeum-Klub exhibition Die Frau in Haus und Beruf (Woman at Home and at Work). That same year, she was elected to membership in the German Werkbund, or German Work Federation, an organization founded in 1907 that aimed to ally art and industry as a means to improve German-made products and designs, a group similar to the Vienna Workshop whose purpose was to help improve competitiveness of German companies in the global market. The Werkbund sponsored lectures for shopkeepers and consumers as well as sought the assistance of museums to influence public taste through exhibitions.

In 1912 she designed a sample working-class flat in the Berlin Gewerkschaftshaus, or Trade Union House. It received much praise for the clarity and functionalism of the furnishings. The 1913 Werkbund yearbook carried a series of photographs which included one by Reich: Elephant Pharmacy, Berlin 1913.

In 1914, Reich converted her studio to a dressmaker's shop and maintained it through the duration of World War I. She contributed work to the 1914 Werkbund Exhibition in Cologne.

On 25 October 1920, Reich was formally recognized by her peers when she was named to the Board of Directors of Deutsche Werkbund. She was the first woman to be appointed to the Werkbund's governing board. It was her responsibility to plan and curate design exhibits hosted by the Werkbund and intended to promote German designers both in Germany and abroad.

From 1921 to 1922, Reich organized and prepared two large exhibitions to be shown at the Newark Museum in Newark, New Jersey. The first exhibition, entitled "The Applied Arts," consisted entirely of women's clothing and accessories, seeking to promote the revival of German fashion and increase cooperation between artists and manufacturers. The second exhibition was an enormous undertaking with the display of more than 1,600 objects, many chosen by Reich, to showcase the quality and breadth of German industrial design. Over 4,000 people visited the exhibition between 18 April and 31 May 1922 and the Newark Museum acquired over sixty-five objects from the exhibition, including a children's clothing design by Reich. The show did not travel in the United States as hoped, given a strong anti-German sentiment subsequent to the First World War. Nonetheless, the show had a profound effect on American design and its influences may be seen in the work of U.S. designers after this date.

From 1924 to 1926, she worked at the Messeamt, or Trade Fair Office, in Frankfurt am Main. There, she was in charge of organizing and designing trade fairs. It was there that she met Ludwig Mies van der Rohe, vice president of the Deutscher Werkbund. This sparked a period of involvement of furniture for van der Rohe as the two collaborated on many projects together. In 1927, the two worked on "Die Wohnung" in Stuttgart for the Werkbund. She designed many interiors for this exhibition including "Wohnraum in Spiegelglas" ("living space in mirror glass"). In 1929 she became the artistic director for the German contribution to the Barcelona World Exposition, where van der Rohe designed his world-famous pavilion. This is where the famous Barcelona chair made its first appearance. This pavilion was considered the highlight of their design efforts.

One of her most significant expositions was during the International Exposition of 1929 in Barcelona. She stressed the need for aligning design with industrial processes and serial production. With this she created mass-produced objects, neatly stacked side by side by the hundreds in elegant, tailored contexts; Reich in fact dissolved the individual unit in an abstract and global image.

In 1931 she had an exhibition called "Dwelling in Our Time Berlin". In 1932, Reich was asked by van der Rohe to teach at the Bauhaus and direct the interior design workshop. She was one of a small number of female teachers on staff, and only the second to hold the title of "Master". She taught interior design and furniture design, heading the interior finishings department which included weaving, wall painting, metalwork, and cabinetry workshops. Writing about Reich's tenure at the Bauhaus, art historian Adrian Sudhalter states that Reich "also manage[d] much of the daily administration of the Bauhaus for Mies." Her tenure was short-lived as the Bauhaus was closed in 1933 by the Nazis, who referred to it as an "oriental palace" and "synagogue" filled with "Bolshevists" and "cultural Marxists" dedicated to degenerate art. In 1934 she had an exhibition called the "Material Show: Wood" exhibit, as well as "German People – German Work".

In 1937, Reich displayed an installation at the 1937 Paris World's Fair. Her installation would become a part of Albert Speer's Nazi Pavilion, during an extremely tense World's Fair.

In 1938, just before the Second World War, Mies emigrated to the U.S. Reich continued to manage her own interior design firm in Germany until her death. Reich visited him in the U.S. in September 1939, but did not stay, returning instead to Berlin.

Her studio was bombed in 1943, and she was subsequently sent to a forced labour camp, where she remained until 1945. After her release at the end of the war, Reich briefly taught at the Universität der Künste in Berlin. She was obliged to resign due to ill health. She was instrumental in the revival of the Deutsche Werkbund, but died in Berlin before its formal re-establishment in 1950. She died on 14 December 1947, aged 62.

=== Work with Mies van der Rohe ===
Through her involvement with the Werkbund, Reich met Ludwig Mies van der Rohe and moved from Frankfurt to Berlin to work with him in 1926. She was Mies' personal and professional partner for 13 years from 1925 until his emigration to the U.S. in 1938. It is said that they were constant companions, working together on curating and implementing exhibitions for the Werkbund, as well as designing modern furniture as part of larger architectural commissions, such as the Barcelona Pavilion in 1929 and the Tugendhat House in Brno. Two of their best known modern furniture designs from this period are the Barcelona Chair and Brno Chair.

Albert Pfeiffer, Vice President of Design and Management at Knoll, has been researching and lecturing on Reich for some time. He points out that:

It became more than a coincidence that Mies's involvement and success in exhibition design began at the same time as his personal relationship with Reich... It is interesting to note that Mies did not fully develop any contemporary furniture successfully before or after his collaboration with Reich.

Reich collaborated and co-designed the Brno Chair, the famous Barcelona Chair, and the Barcelona Pavilion along with Mies on behalf of the German government for the 1929 World Exhibition in Barcelona, Spain. The Barcelona Pavilion is considered to be a masterpiece of modern design, however, Lilly Reich is rarely mentioned in textbooks, nor given proper credit for her contributions. Lilly Reich traveled to the United States, England, and Austria to study and work with the designers of her time. She also curated exhibitions on behalf of her government.

== Legacy ==
In 1996, the Museum of Modern Art in New York presented an exhibition on her work entitled "Lilly Reich: Designer and Architect", which for the first time brought attention to this influential but almost forgotten designer.

In 2018, the Mies van der Rohe Foundation in Spain presented the first edition of the Lilly Reich Grant for equality in architecture. The grant was specifically addressed to the study of the work by Lilly Reich herself, and to delving into the knowledge and dissemination of an essential figure in the history of modern architecture.

There are streets named after Lilly Reich in the German cities of Munich, Hildesheim, Ingolstadt, and Rösrath, as well as the French city of Nantes.

== See also ==
- List of chairs
- List of furniture designers
- Women of the Bauhaus

== Publications ==
- McQuaid, Matilda (1996). Lilly Reich: Designer and Architect (PDF). New York: The Museum of Modern Art. ISBN 0-87070-144-4.
- Conti, Giulia (2022). Lilly Reich. La rivoluzione della spazialità tessile tra emancipazione e avanguardia. Roma: TabEdizioni. ISBN 978-88-9295-208-9
