= Villa Tugendhat =

House in Brno, Czech Republic

- Vila Tugendhat
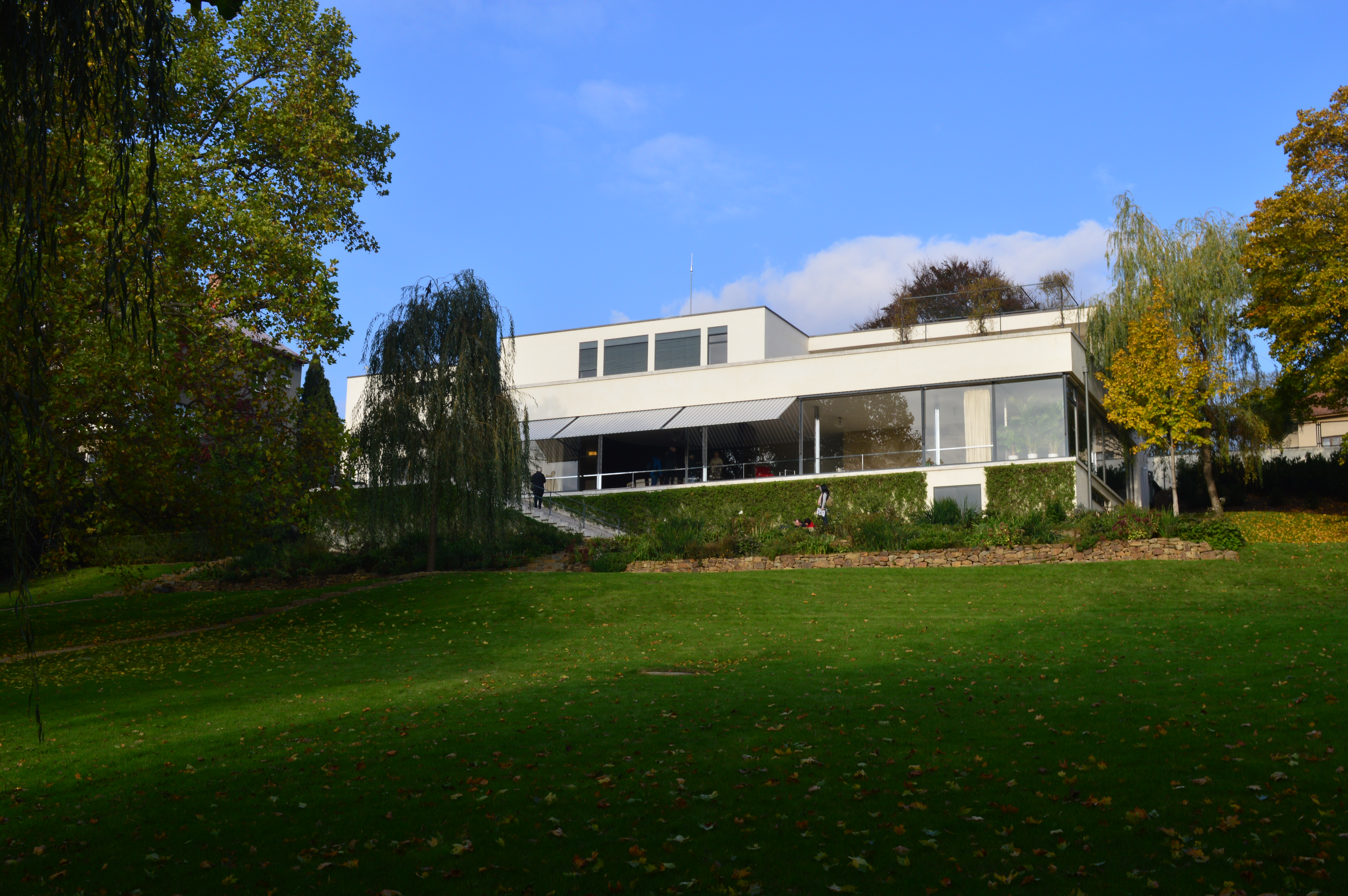
- View from the garden

General information
- Location: Brno, Czech Republic
- Coordinates: 49°12′26″N 16°36′57″E
- Construction started: 1928
- Completed: 1930
- Client: Fritz and Greta Tugendhat

Design and construction
- Architects: Ludwig Mies van der Rohe and Lilly Reich

UNESCO World Heritage Site
- Criteria: Cultural: ii, iv
- Reference: 1052
- Inscription: 2001 (25th Session)
- Area: 0.73 ha (1.8 acres)
- Buffer zone: 2,824.9 ha (6,980 acres)

Villa Tugendhat (Czech: Vila Tugendhat) is an architecturally significant building in Brno, Czech Republic. It is one of the pioneering prototypes of modern architecture in Europe, and was designed by the German architects Ludwig Mies van der Rohe and Lilly Reich. It was built between 1928 and 1930 for Fritz Tugendhat and his wife Greta, of the wealthy and influential Jewish Czech Tugendhat family. Of reinforced concrete, the villa soon became an icon of modernism. Famous for its revolutionary use of space and industrial building materials, the building was added to the UNESCO World Heritage List in 2001.

== Design ==
The free-standing three-story villa is on a slope and faces the south-west. The second story (the ground floor) consists of the main living and social areas with the conservatory, the terrace, the kitchen and servants' rooms. The third story (the first floor) has the main entrance from the street with a passage to the terrace, the entrance hall, and rooms for the parents, children and the nanny with appropriate facilities. The chauffeur's flat with the garages and the terrace are accessed separately.

Mies' design principle of "less is more" and emphasis on functional amenities created a fine example of early functionalist architecture, a groundbreaking new vision in building design at the time. Mies used a revolutionary iron framework, which enabled him to dispense with supporting walls and arrange the interior in order to achieve a feeling of space and light. Accordingly, the main living area features a curtain wall divided into multiple large windows, framing a panoramic view of Špilberk Castle; remarkably, two of these windows can be completely lowered into the floor, much like in an automobile. Mies specified all the furnishings, in collaboration with interior designer Lilly Reich (two armchairs designed for the building, the Tugendhat chair and the Brno chair, are still in production). There were no paintings or decorative items in the villa, but the interior was by no means austere due to the use of naturally patterned materials such as the onyx wall and rare tropical woods. The onyx wall is partially translucent and changes appearance when the evening sun is low. The architect managed to make the magnificent view from the villa an integral part of the interior.

The cost was very high due to the unusual construction method, luxurious materials, and the use of modern technology for heating and ventilation. The lower-ground level was used as a service area. An ultra-modern air-conditioning system was installed and a glass façade that opens completely assisted by a mechanism built into the wall. The floor area was unusually large and open compared to the average family home of the period, which, in addition to the various storage rooms, made the structure unique if not confusing to visitors not used to such minimalism.

=== Features ===
The main living area features a dividing wall of brown-gold onyx, which Mies sourced from the Atlas Mountains in Morocco. He supervised the cutting and finishing himself.

Unusually for the time, the building features air conditioning.

In the basement there are a series of dedicated service rooms, including a mechanism to retract the windows and the Mottenkammer, a dedicated moth-resistant storage room for keeping fur coats.

== Photo gallery ==
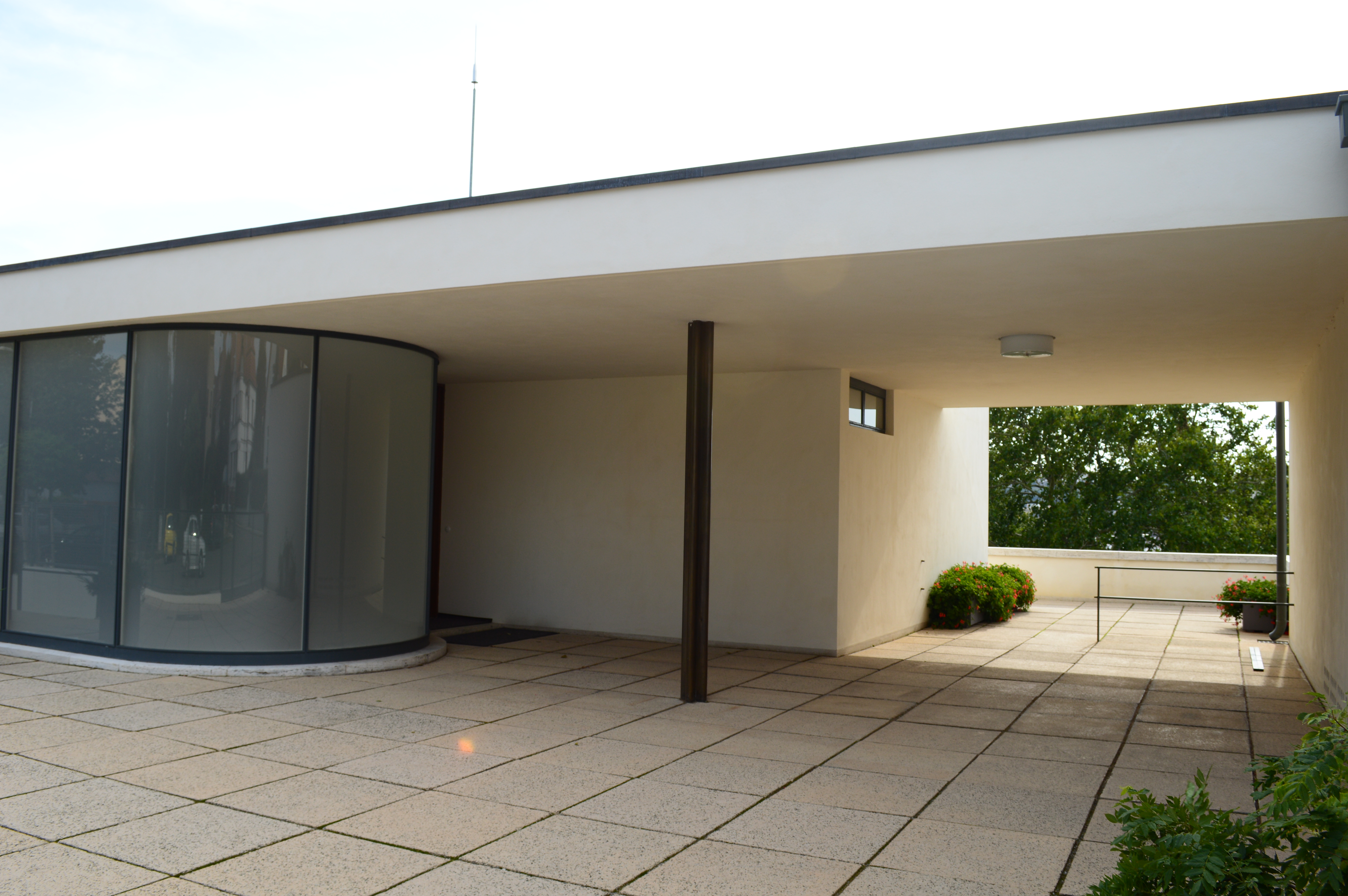
Front view

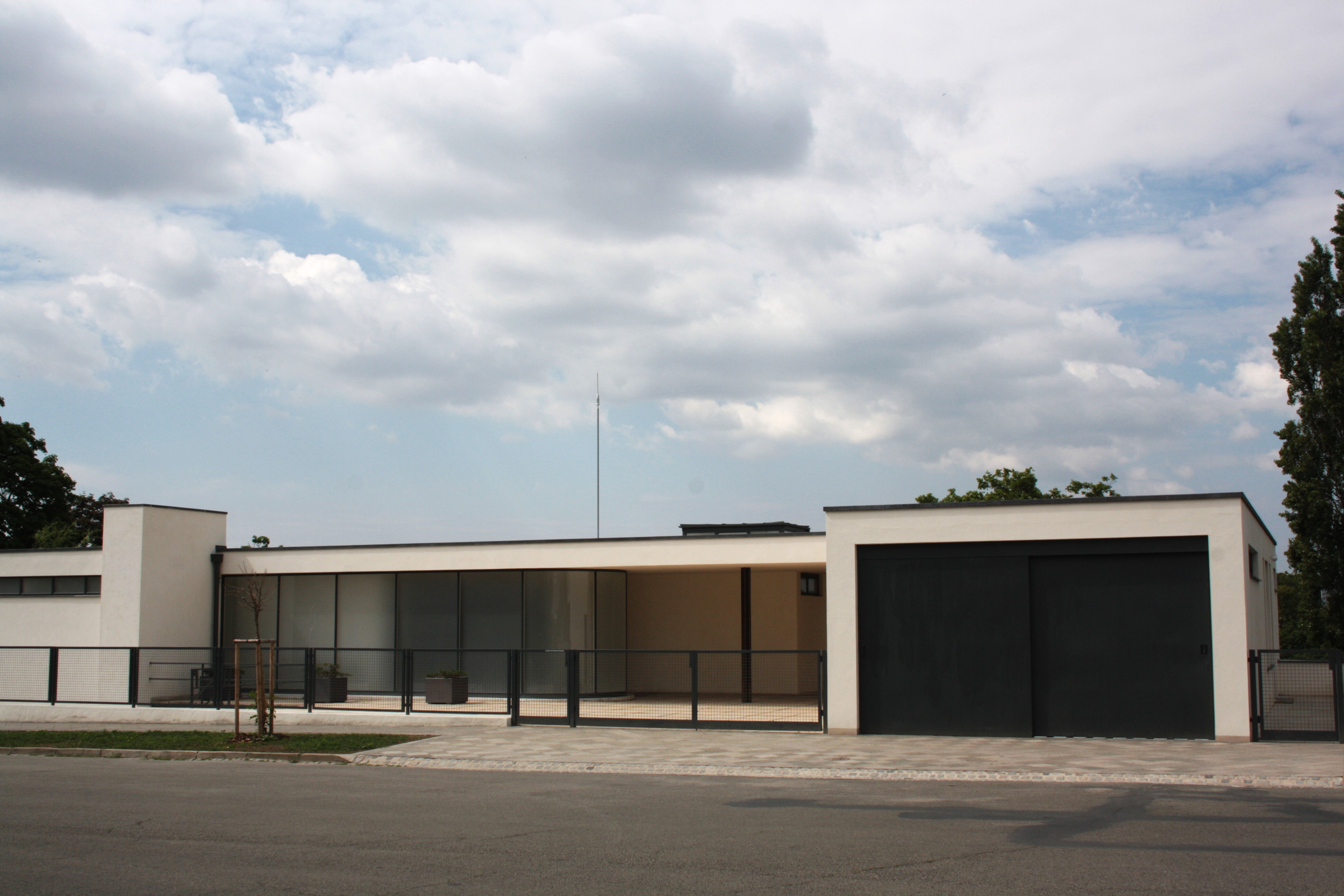
View from the street after reconstruction in 2012

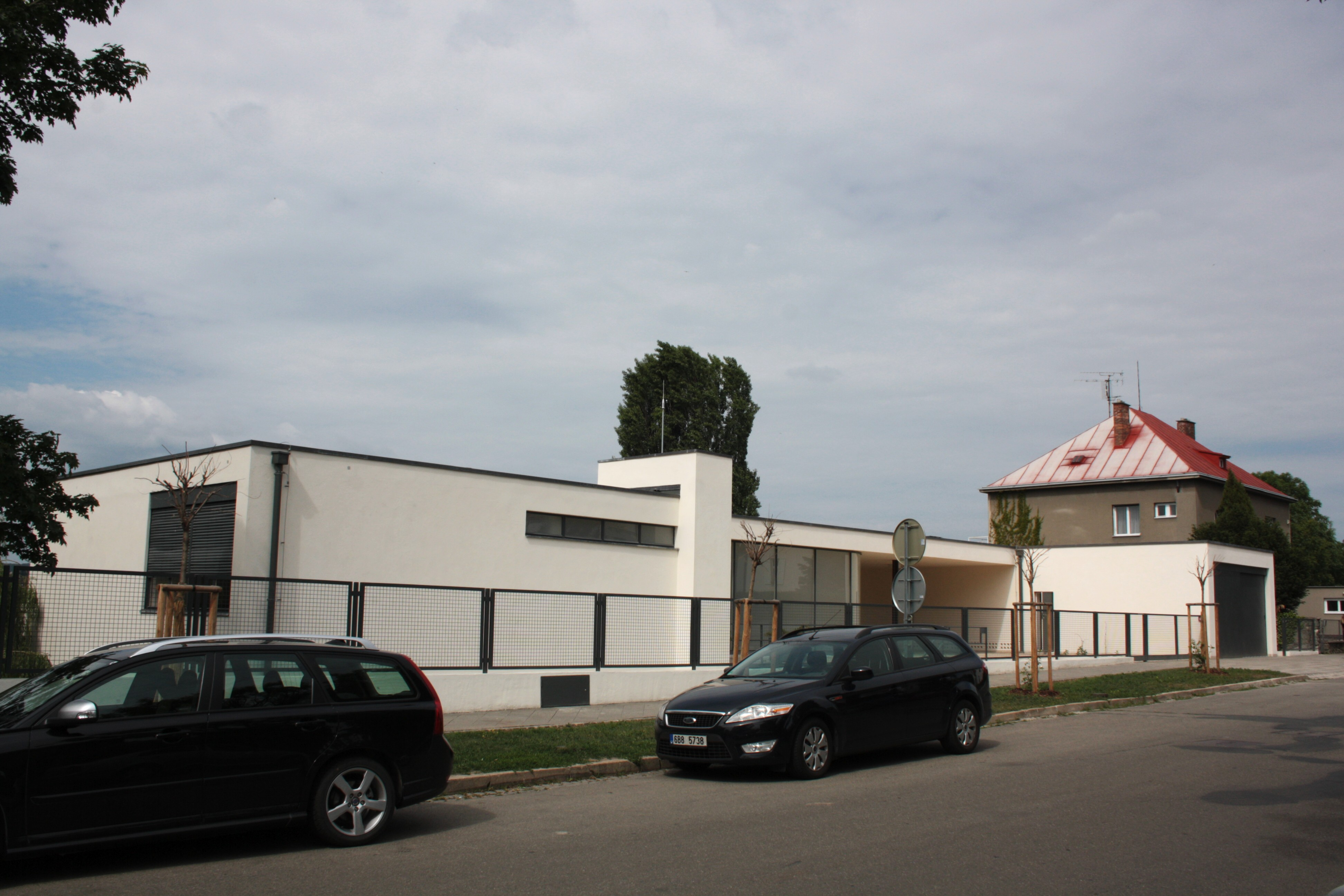
View of the left side from the street 2012

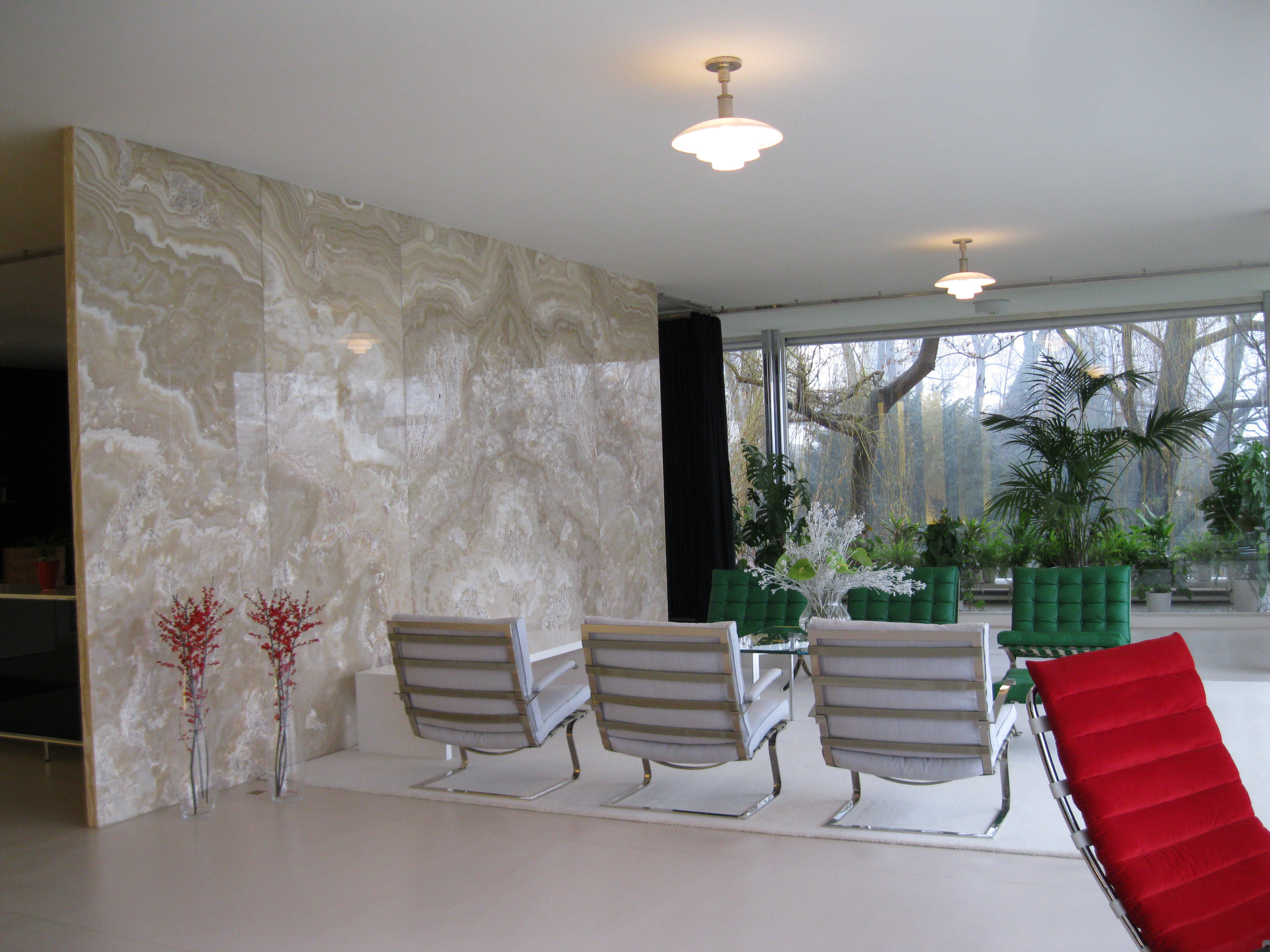
The onyx wall in the living room

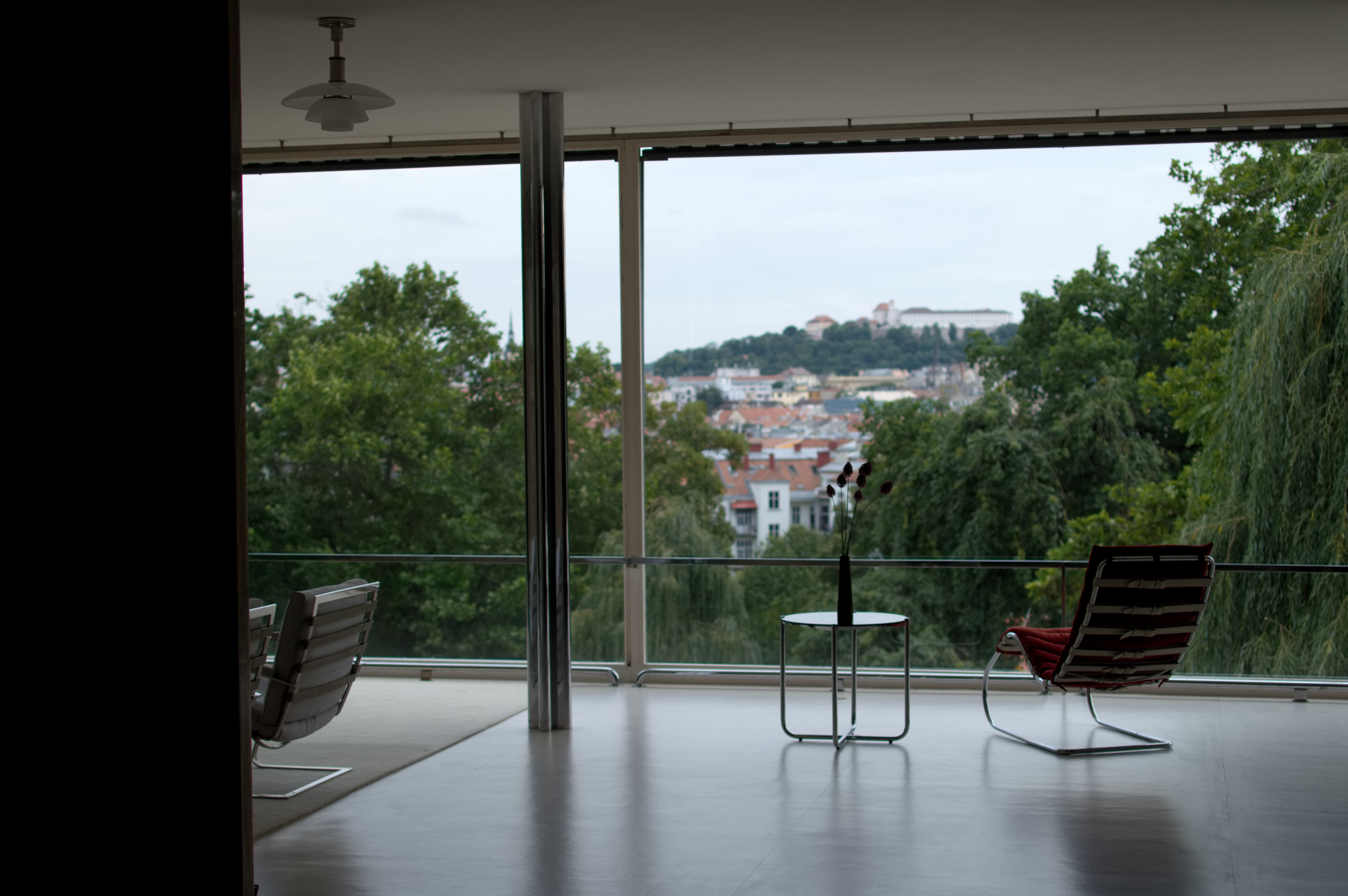
Vila Tugendhat interior with a view of Špilberk Castle

== History ==
The villa was commissioned by the German Jewish Fritz and Greta Tugendhat. The construction company of Artur and Moritz Eisler began construction in the summer of 1929 and finished it in 14 months.

Fritz and Greta Tugendhat lived in the villa for just eight years before the Nazi's persecution of and genocide of the Jewish people forced the family to flee Czechoslovakia for their lives with their children in 1938 (including philosopher Ernst Tugendhat), shortly before the country was dismembered following the Munich Agreement with the Nazis.

The family moved to Switzerland and then had to flee again to Venezuela; after the Holocaust they returned to Switzerland, but never were able to live in the villa again.

=== During World War II ===
The villa was confiscated by the Gestapo in 1939 and used as an apartment and office; its interior was modified and many pieces disappeared.

In 1942 the house was rented out as offices of the Nazi Messerschmitt aeroplane works. Willy Messerschmitt had his own apartment in the villa.

In April 1945, Brno was liberated by the Red Army and a Soviet unit quartered in the villa, doing considerable damage to the building's white linoleum floor. The often reported information that the villa was also used as a stable is unlikely, as the entrance door from the garden is too small. What furniture remained in the villa was used for firewood.

=== Post-war restoration and opening to the public ===
After the war, on 26 October 1945, the Tugendhat family filed a request to preserve their Czechoslovak citizenship and an application for the restitution of real estate was filed in 1947. However, all property of the Tugendhats remained seized. The villa became property of the city, and the family's factory became part of the Mosilana National Enterprise.

In the post-war years, the building was partially repaired and used for various purposes (for example, as a children's physiotherapy centre) for several decades after World War II.

Greta Tugendhat returned to the villa in 1967 with Dirk Lohan, a senior architect from Mies's Chicago studio (and his grandson), and explained the original design to him, and a group of Czech architects set out to repair it. It was inscribed on the National List of Cultural Heritage in 1969 and restored after 1980. On 26 August 1992, Václav Klaus and Vladimír Mečiar, the political leaders of Czechoslovakia, met there to sign the document that divided the country into the Czech Republic and Slovak Republic. Since 1994 the villa has been open to the public as a museum administered by the city of Brno.

In 1993 the Villa Tugendhat Fund and Friends of Tugendhat were formed to preserve the villa. In 1995 Brno received a $15,000 grant to pay for preliminary research from the Samuel H. Kress European Preservation Program, part of the World Monuments Fund. The International Music and Art Foundation, based in Liechtenstein, pledged $100,000, because a trustee, Nicholas Thaw, was also a trustee of the World Monuments Fund. The Robert Wilson Foundation matched the $100,000.

In 2007 Daniela Hammer-Tugendhat applied for the restitution of the villa, citing a law covering works of art confiscated during the Holocaust. The reason for this application appears to have been their frustration over the failure of the municipality of Brno to carry out vital restoration work due to the deterioration of the concrete used in construction. Entire sections of the interior were missing. Later, parts of the original wood panelling were found at Masaryk University, a building used by the Gestapo as their Brno headquarters.

Reconstruction and restoration started in February 2010 with estimated costs of 150 million CZK (approximately EUR 5,769,000; US$7,895,000). This reconstruction finished in February 2012 and the villa was reopened to the public in March. To celebrate the villa's restoration, the Royal Institute of British Architects launched 'Villa Tugendhat in Context', an exhibition in London giving a visual history and a record of the recent renovation through the testimony of three generations of photographers.

Near Villa Tugendhat is Greta's family home, the Art Nouveau Löw-Beer Villa (now a branch of the Museum of the Brno Region), which will present an exhibition The World of the Brno Bourgeoisie around the Löw-Beers and Tugendhat.

== In popular culture ==
The villa was a principal location in the 2007 film Hannibal Rising, serving as the villa of the villain, Vladis Gutas. Simon Mawer's 2009 Booker Prize-shortlisted novel, The Glass Room, is a fictional account of a house inspired by the villa. A film based in part on the novel, The Affair, was shot at the villa and released in 2019.

== See also ==
- Villa Wolf (Gubin)
- Haus Lange and Haus Esters in Krefeld
