= Cantilever chair =

Type of chair

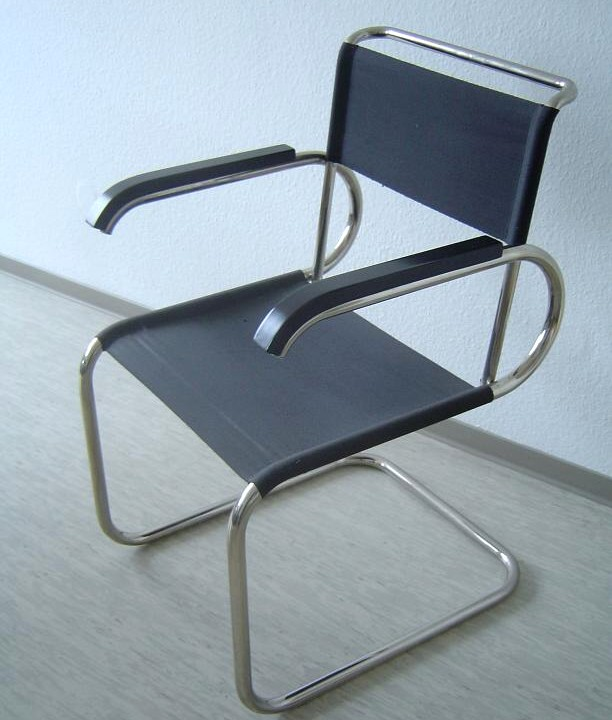
B55 Cantilever chair by Marcel Breuer

A cantilever chair is a chair whose seating and framework are not supported by the typical arrangement of four legs, but instead is held erect and aloft by a single leg or legs that are attached to one end of a chair's seat and bent in an L shape, thus also serving as the chair's supporting base. Nearly a century after its inception, tubular steel remains the prime choice for the cantilever chair, with Marcel Breuer being perhaps the greatest champion of this design technique, using the overhanging cantilever styling in both his furniture and architecture. Ludwig Mies van der Rohe and Alvar Aalto are other historical figures who contributed to the popularity of the cantilever chair.

With the creation of his Wassily Chair in 1925, Marcel Breuer holds the distinction of first using bent and polished tubular steel as both a supporting framework and a decorative element for furniture.

In the 1930s, Thonet-Nederland summoned W. H. Gispen to court on account of breach of authorship of Mart Stam on the cantilever chair. According to the judge, because no patent was applied for, the "Stam"-chair enjoyed no legal protection. Gispen now tried to fight the patent granted to Mies van der Rohe on his cantilever chair. The trial dragged on, which only stopped when Mies's patent ran out. Later it was Mart Stam who was awarded the European patent for the cantilever chair.

It has been suggested that Mart Stam might have been inspired by a cantilever tubular steel seat seen installed in a 1926 Tatra T12 two-door saloon car.

== See also ==
- Seamless pipe
