= Wassily chair =

Chair designed by Marcel Breuer

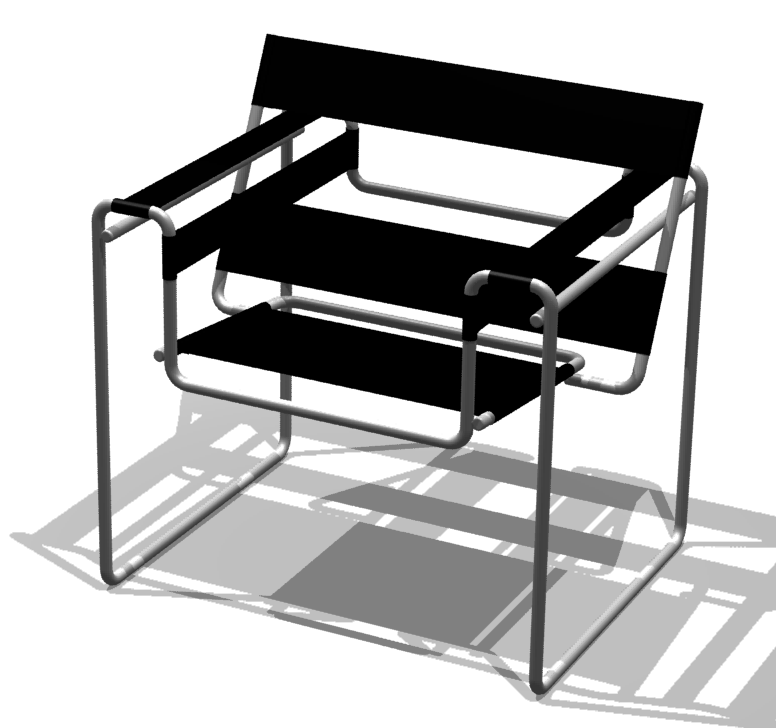
Wassily chair by Marcel Breuer

Marcel Breuer and the Wassily chair

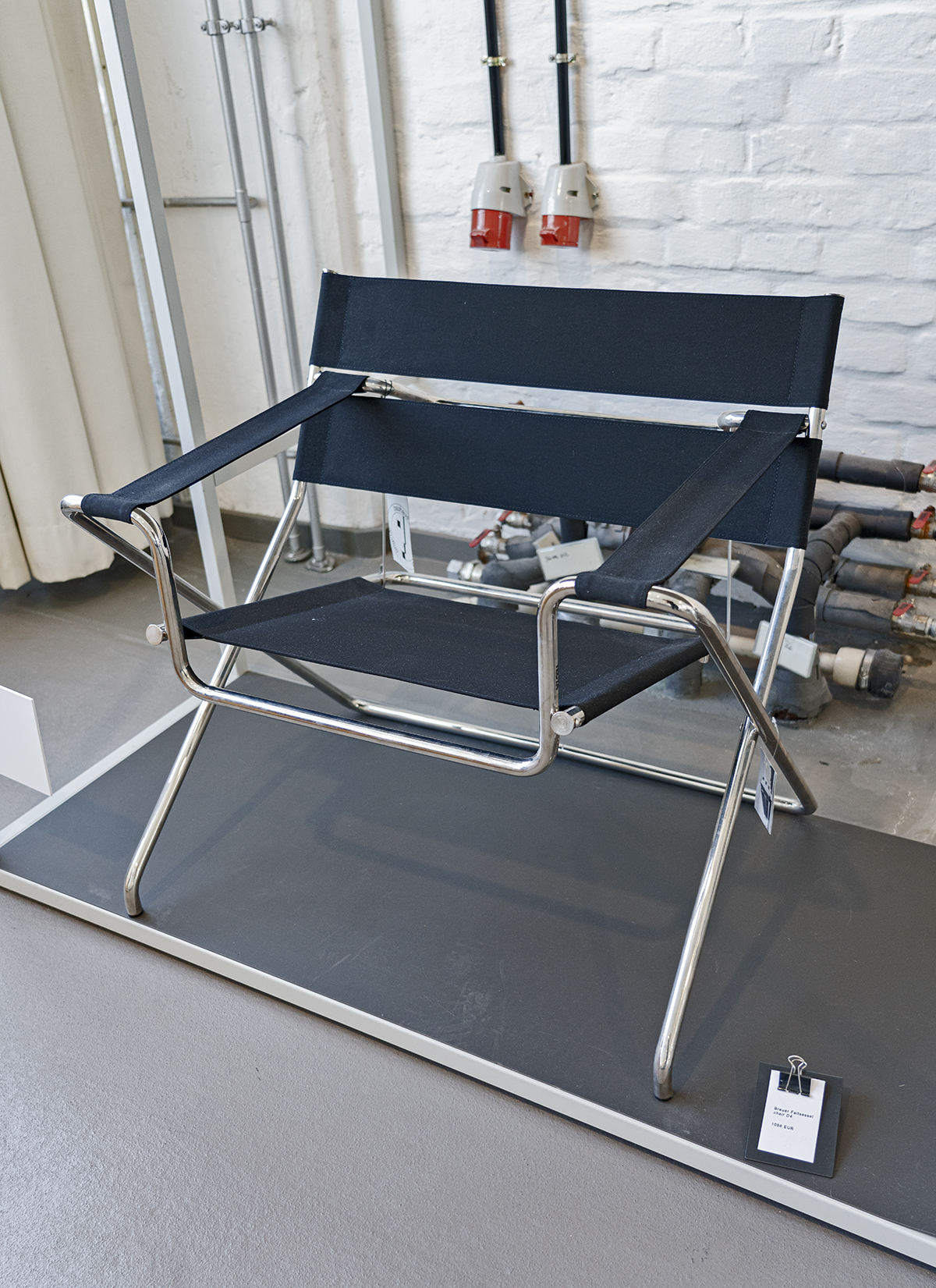
Marcel Breuer Faltsessel, Chair D4 (1927), from the Bauhaus Dessau

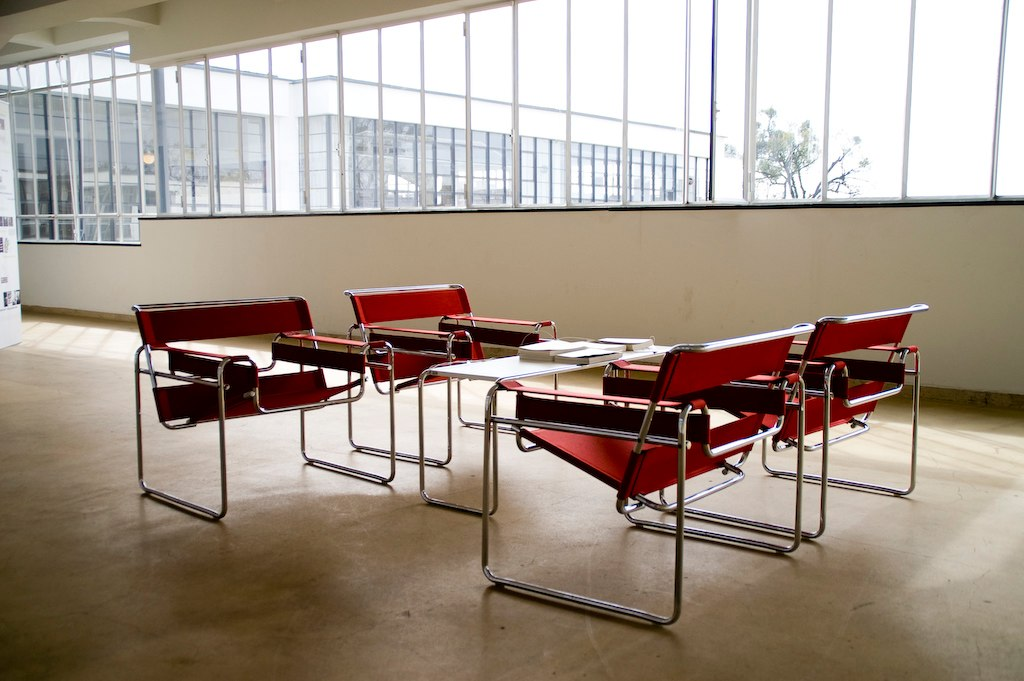
Wassily chairs in the Bauhaus of Dessau

The Wassily chair, also known as the Model B3 chair, was designed by Marcel Breuer in 1925–1926 while he was the head of the cabinet-making workshop at the Bauhaus, in Dessau, Germany.

Despite popular belief, the chair was not designed specifically for the non-objective painter Wassily Kandinsky, who was on the Bauhaus faculty at the same time. Kandinsky had admired the completed design, and Breuer fabricated a duplicate for Kandinsky's personal quarters. The chair became known as "Wassily" decades later when it was reissued by Italian manufacturer Gavina, which has discovered the anecdotal Kandinsky connection during its research on the chair's origins.

== History ==
A protégé of Bauhaus founder Walter Gropius, Marcel Breuer is known for his work in architecture and furniture. Breuer was a student and subsequently a master carpenter at the Bauhaus in the early 1920s. His work in both architecture and furniture has been described as embodying the Bauhaus objective of reconciling art and industry. While at the Bauhaus, Breuer designed a tubular-steel furniture collection – inspired by bicycle construction and fabricated using the techniques of local plumbers. His first designs, including the Wassily chair, are considered icons of the modern furniture movement.

The chair later known as the "Wassily" was first manufactured in the late 1920s by Thonet, the German-Austrian furniture manufacturer most known for its bent-wood chair designs, under the name Model B3. It was initially available in both folding and non-folding versions. In this early iteration, the straps were made of fabric, pulled taut on the reverse side with the use of springs.

The fabric used was made from Eisengarn ('iron yarn'), a strong, shiny, waxed-cotton thread. It had been invented in the 19th century, but Margaretha Reichardt (1907–1984), a student at the Bauhaus weaving workshop, experimented and improved the quality of the thread and developed cloth and strapping material for use on Breuer's tubular-steel chairs.

The Thonet-produced version of the chair is the rarest and was discontinued during World War II.

Most of Breuer's early designs were produced under license by the Berlin-based manufacturer, Standard-Möbel, Lengyel & Company. The Wassily chair was the only significant early Breuer design not offered by Standard-Möbel, Lengyel & Co.

After the War years, Gavina acquired the license for the Wassily, along with the Breuer designs previously sold by Standard-Möbel, Lengyel & Co., and introduced the more recognizable Wassily version, which replaced the fabric with black leather straps. However, the fabric version was still available. In 1968, Knoll bought the Gavina Group of Bologna. This brought all of Breuer's designs into the Knoll catalog.

This chair was revolutionary in its use of materials (bent tubular steel and Eisengarn) and manufacturing methods. In 1925, Breuer purchased his first bicycle, and he was impressed with the lightness of its tubular steel frame. This inspired him to experiment with using the material in furniture design. The design (and all subsequent steel tubing furniture) was technologically feasible only because the German steel manufacturer Mannesmann had recently perfected a process for making seamless pipe. Previously, steel tubing had a welded seam, which would collapse when the tubing was bent.

The Wassily chair, like many other designs of the modernist movement, has been mass-produced since the 1960s. As a design classic, it is still available today. Though patent designs are expired, the trademark name rights to the design are owned by Knoll of New York City. Reproductions are produced worldwide by other manufacturers, who market the product under various names.

== See also ==
- Adirondack chair
- Aeron chair
- Barcelona chair
- Cantilever chair
- Curule chair
- Faldstool
- Glastonbury chair
- Grand Confort
- List of chairs
- Turned chair
- Watchman's chair
- X-chair
