= Faldstool =

Portable folding chair used for Christian services

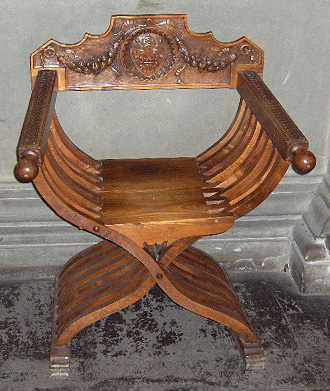
Faldstool displayed at Palazzo Vecchio in Florence, Italy

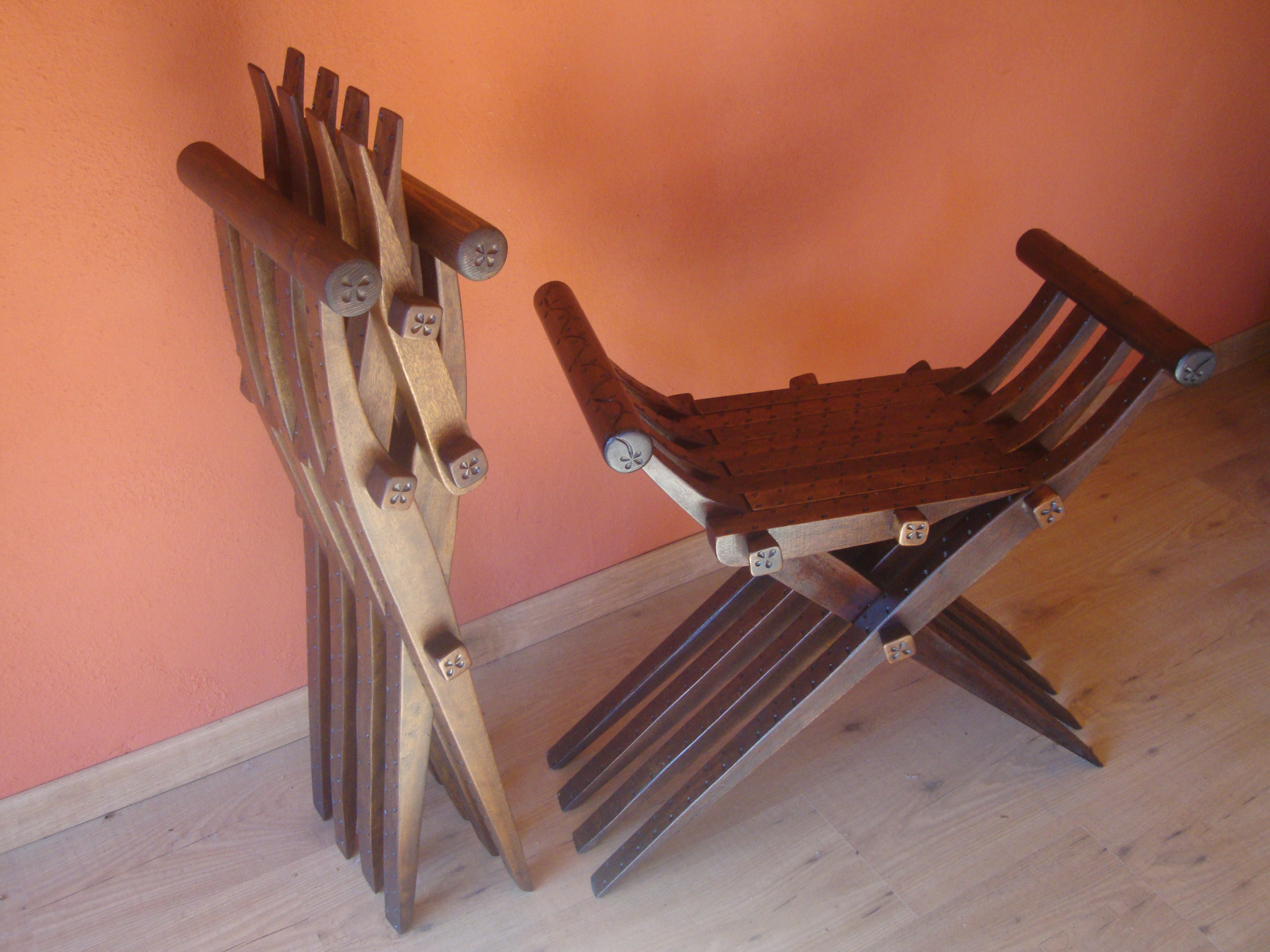
Reconstruction faldstool, folded and unfolded

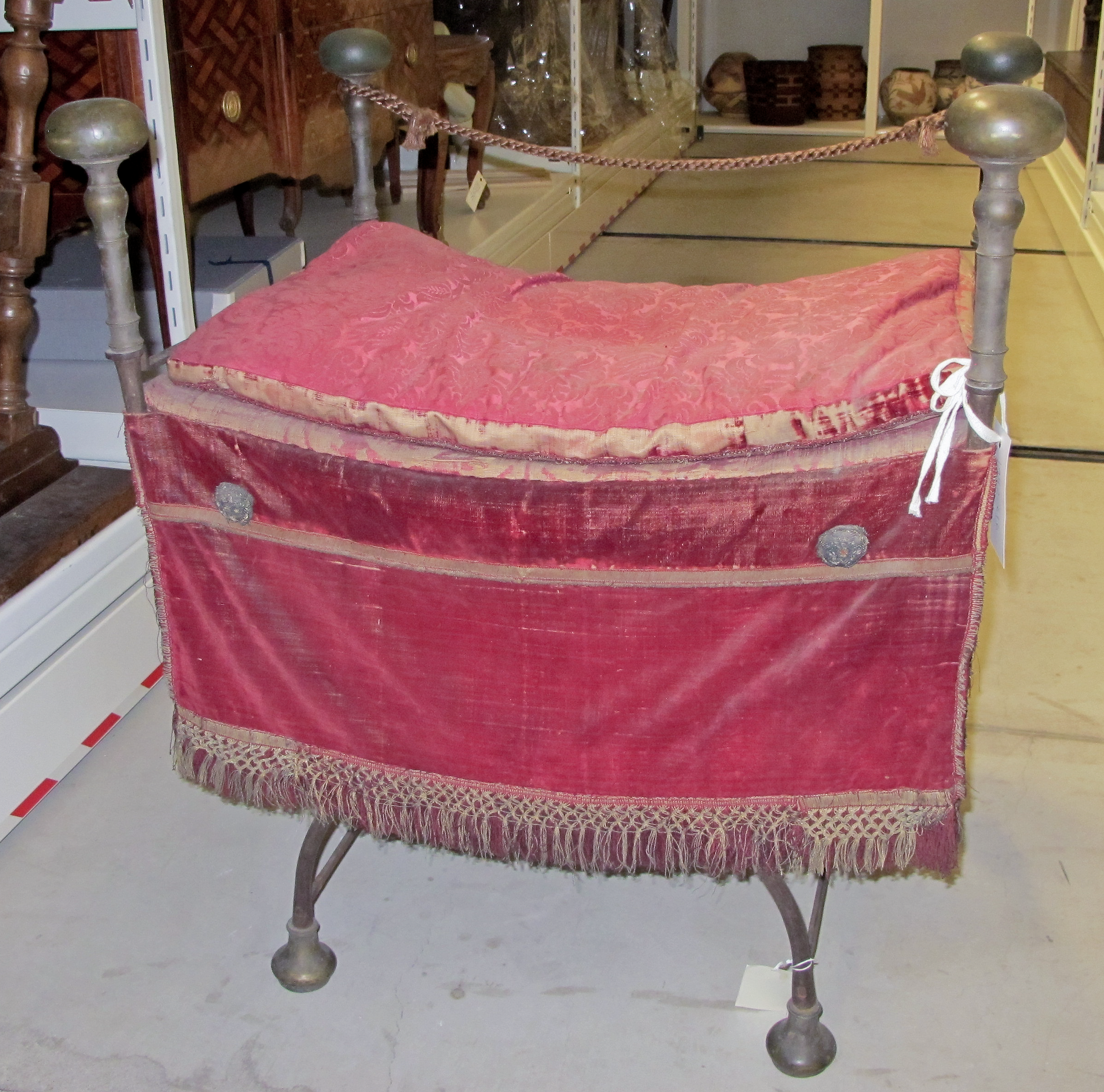
Ecclesiastical faldstool, 1400s-1500s

Faldstool (from the O.H. Ger. falden or falten, "to fold," and stuol, Mod. Ger. Stuhl, "stool"; from the medieval Latin faldistolium derived, through the old form fauesteuil, from the Mod. Fr. fauteuil) is a portable folding chair, used by a bishop when not occupying the throne in his own cathedral, or when officiating in a cathedral or church other than his own; hence any movable folding stool used during divine service.

Whatever the origins, it is difficult not to note the general resemblance to the curule chair or sella curulis, which according to Livy supposedly derived its name from currus, "chariot", and like the Roman toga originated in Etruria, but much earlier stools supported on a cross-frame are known from the New Kingdom of Egypt.

Just as a campstool of similar form came to be used by military commanders in the field, so it became the ceremonial chair that accompanied the bishop in his official visitations. The bishop will either use the faldstool as a seat, or kneel in front of it, resting his forearms on it in prayer like a prie-dieu, depending upon the rubrical requirements. Other prelates may be granted the use of a faldstool during services, with certain limitations. The faldstool may be covered with silk cloth in red, green or violet, depending upon the liturgical season or the rank of the prelate.

In the Anglican Church, a faldstool is a desk at which a litany is recited. It also refers to the small, upholstered prie-dieu at which the British sovereign and the royal consort kneel during important religious services such as coronations and weddings.

The term faldistory has a similar meaning.

== See also ==
- Adirondack chair
- Aeron chair
- Barcelona chair
- Curule chair
- Glastonbury chair
- List of chairs
- Wassily Chair
- Watchman's chair
- X-chair
- Throne of Dagobert
