= Seat of honor =

== See also ==
- Curule seat
