= Curule seat =

Foldable and transportable chair

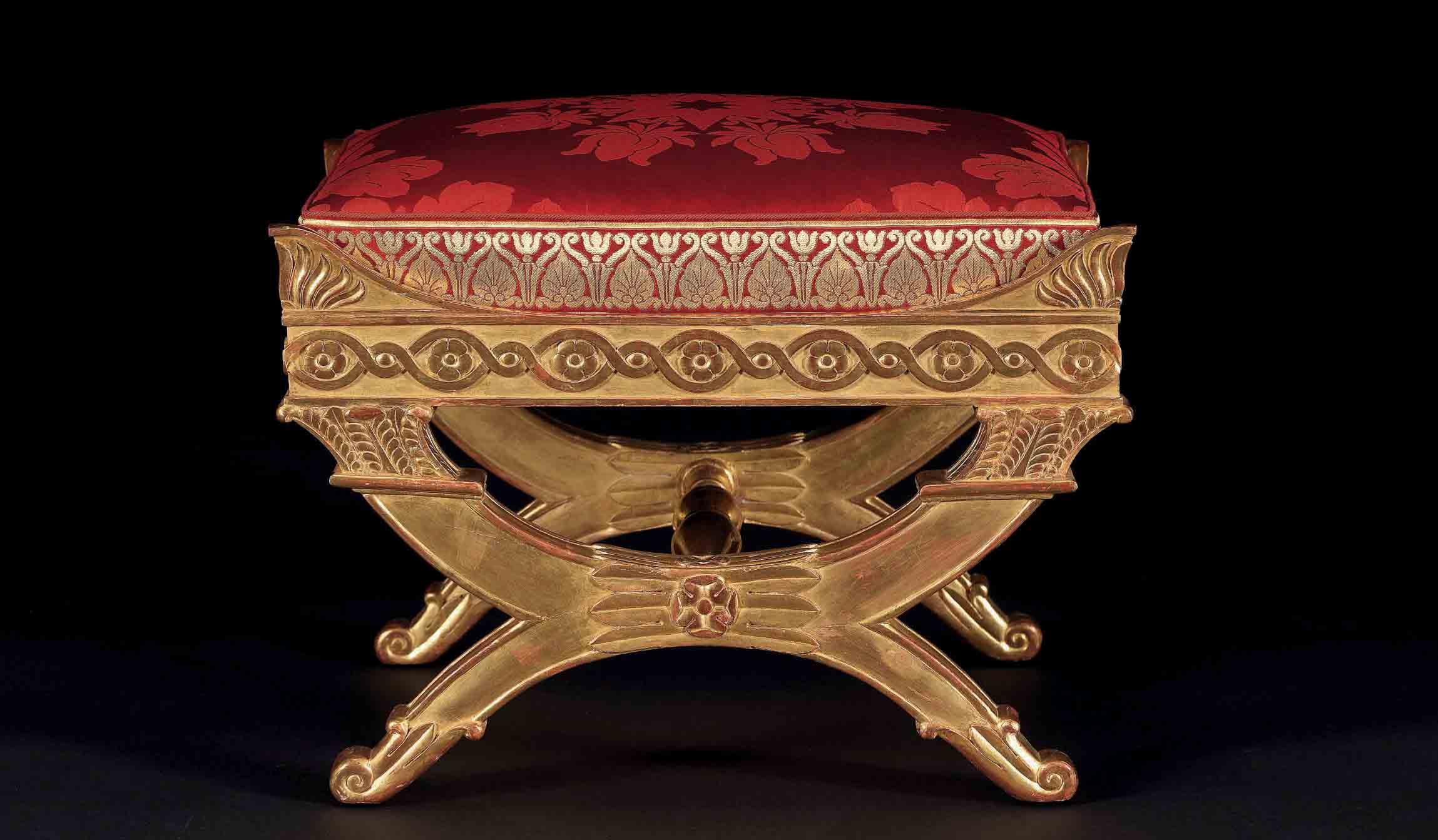
A curule seat probably designed by Karl Friedrich Schinkel, made in carved wood and gilded ca. 1810 in Berlin, later restored and reupholstered by a private dealer

A curule seat (Sella curulis) is a design of a (usually) foldable and transportable chair noted for its uses in Ancient Rome and Europe through to the 20th century. Its status in early Rome as a symbol of political or military power carried over to other civilizations, as it was also used in this capacity by kings in Europe, Napoleon, and others.

== History ==
=== Ancient Rome ===
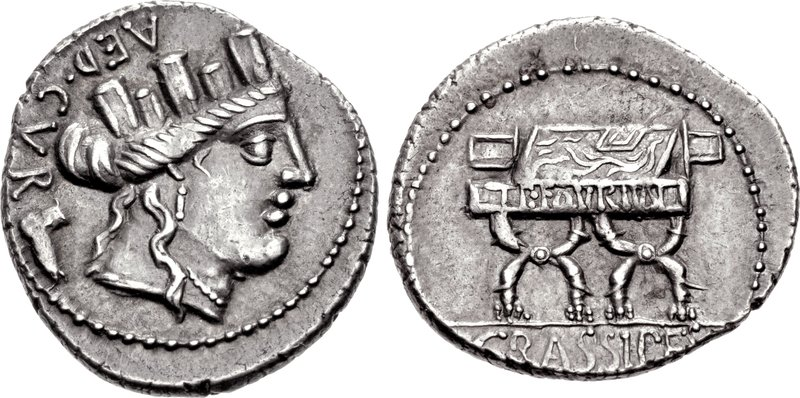
Denarius (84 BC) of the curule aedile Publius Furius Crassipes, with a curule seat on the reverse of a tower-crowned Cybele

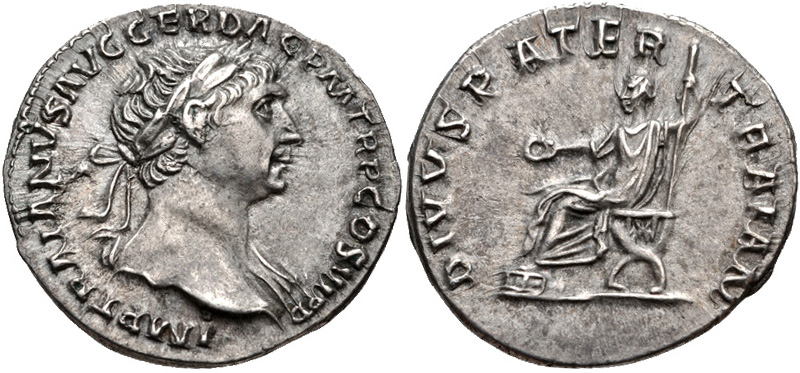
Denarius (AD 112–115) of the emperor Trajan, with his deified father Marcus Ulpius Traianus on a curule seat

In the Roman Republic and the Roman Empire, the curule chair (sella curulis, supposedly from currus, "chariot") was the seat upon which magistrates holding imperium were entitled to sit. This includes dictators, magistri equitum, consuls, praetors, curule aediles, and the promagistrates, temporary or de facto holders of such offices. Additionally, the censors and the flamen of Jupiter (Flamen Dialis) were also allowed to sit on a curule seat, though these positions did not hold imperium. Livy writes that the three flamines maiores or high priests of the Archaic Triad of major gods were each granted the honor of the curule chair. Additionally, when an interregnum occurred in the Roman republic, the interrex was also granted a sella curulis along with the other symbols of power given to a regular magistrate. The precise name of the curule seat also varied based on the specific type and holder of the seat, such as: "sella regia (royal chair), sella ducis (general's chair), sella consularis (consular chair), sella consulis (chair of a consul), sella eburnea (an ivory seat often used as a gift for foreign dignitaries), sella castrensis (the campstool, a military version of the sella curulis), and sella aurea (a gold chair)."

The curule seat was carried by public slaves when being transported from place to place. This custom further symbolized the authority of the magistrate/owner of the sella curulis. Imagery of a slave carrying a curule seat can be seen in archaic Etruscan art (see in Gallery "Tomb of the Augurs" 530 BCE). As seen on the Tomb of Augurs, a small slave is seen to be bearing a sella curulis on his shoulders in the lower left corner. In the Tomb of the Jugglers from 520 BCE (see in Gallery "Tomb of the Jugglers"), the magistrate to whom the tomb is dedicated is also seen to be seated on his sella curulis on the far right which indicates that he is the owner and magistrate.

The curule chairs themselves indicated the authority of the magistrate as he conducted business while sitting in the chair. Therefore, the seats themselves have been symbolically viewed as political pawns for power over Rome itself. However, this powerful symbolism appears to be limited due to incidents where the sella curulis was purposely destroyed. The destruction of the chair as a means to disrupt or attack a magistrate’s rule did not actually prevent the owner of the curule seat from exercising his power. In Cassius Dio’s Roman History, Dio recounts the event where Glabrio destroyed Lucius Lucullus’ curule seat out of anger towards Lucullus. However, Lucullus and his attending officials still proceeded with business although the sella curulis was destroyed.

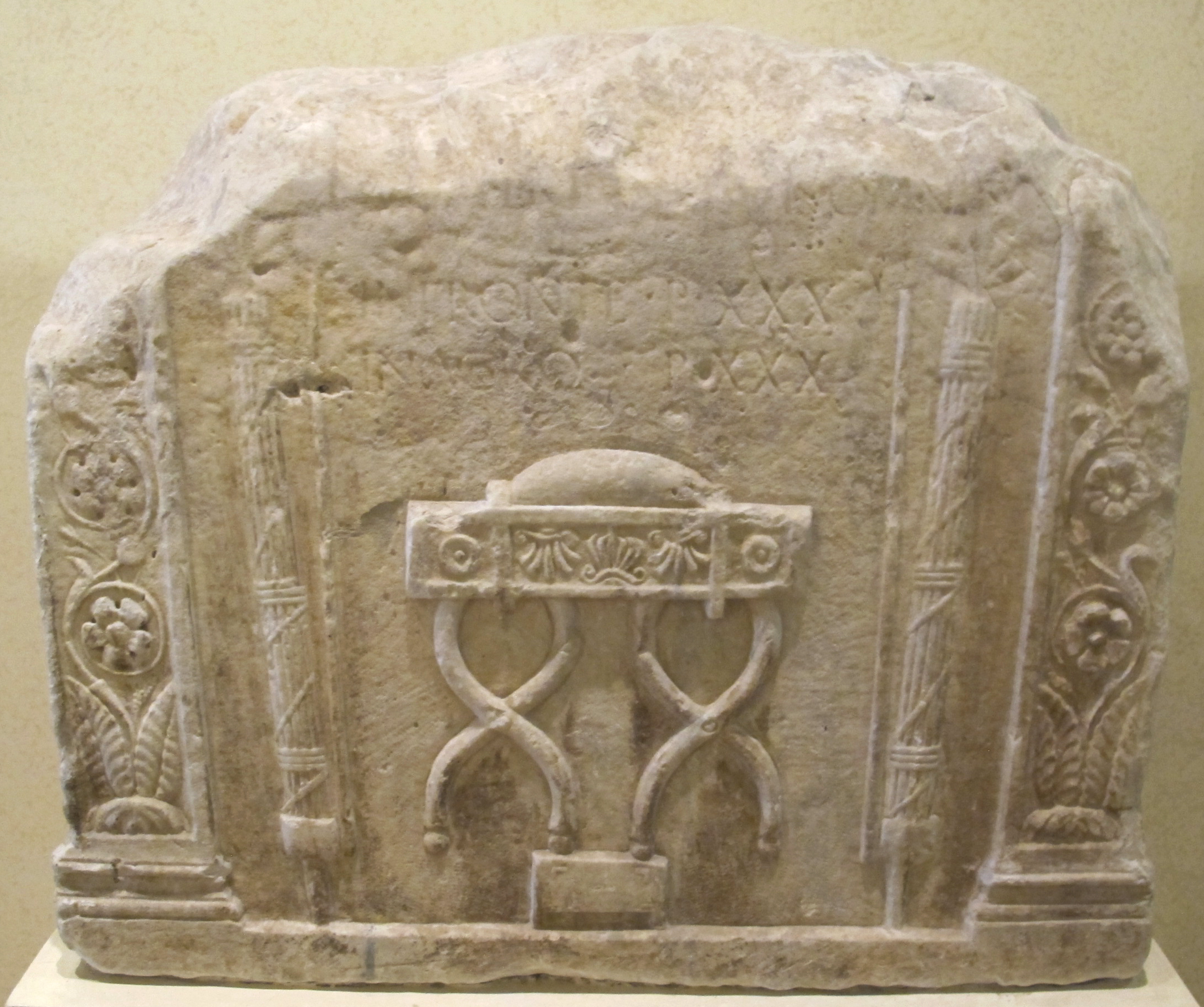
Curule seat on a relief fragment (latter 1st century AD, Museo nazionale di Villa Guinigi, Lucca)

According to Livy, the curule seat, like the Roman toga, originated in Etruria, and it has been used on surviving Etruscan monuments to identify magistrates. However, much earlier stools supported on a cross-frame are known from the New Kingdom of Egypt. One of the earliest recorded examples of the curule chair proper was in 494 BC when the honour of a curule chair in the Circus Maximus was awarded to the Roman dictator Manius Valerius Maximus as a result of his victory over the Sabines. According to Cassius Dio, early in 44 BC a senate decree granted Julius Caesar the curule seat everywhere except in the theatre, where his gilded chair and jeweled crown were carried in, putting him on a par with the gods. The curule chair is also used on Roman medals as well as funerary monuments to express a curule magistracy; when traversed by a hasta, it is the symbol of Juno.

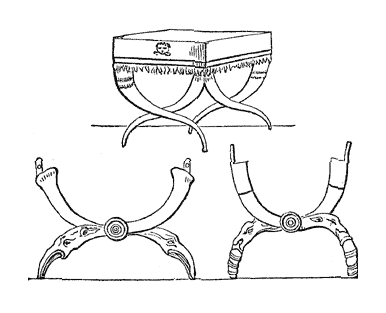
Drawing of two pairs of bronze legs belonging to sellae curules, preserved in the museum at Naples and a sella curulis, copied from the Vatican collection

The curule seat was also used in funeral processions. Several pieces of Etruscan art, urns, and tomb reliefs from the 4th century BCE portray a magistrate's funerary procession. The curule seat was one of the many symbols displayed during the procession which indicated his status and prestige, along with the fasces, lituus-bearers, and other emblems of his office. The custom of bearing the curule chair of the magistrate at his funeral was present in Rome as well. The funerary monument from via Labicana itself is shaped like a sella curulis (see in Gallery below). Additionally, on the top beam of the monument, the frieze prominently features a sella curulis beside the presumed magistrate and his attendants. For example, Dio recounts that Caesar’s golden curule seat was displayed in his funeral procession along with his golden crown and a golden image of him. Polybius detailed that the representatives of the family would sit in the curule seats of the deceased during public ceremonies. Additionally, the curule seat of a magistrate was also ceremonially paraded while he was living. An example of this appears when the golden sella curules of Tiberius and Sejanus were displayed at the ludi scaenici in 30 CE.

In Rome, the curule chair was traditionally made of or veneered with ivory, with curved legs forming a wide X; it had no back, and low arms. Although often of luxurious construction, this chair was meant to be uncomfortable to sit on for long periods of time, the double symbolism being that the official was expected to carry out his public function in an efficient and timely manner, and that his office, being an office of the republic, was temporary, not perennial. The chair could be folded, and thus was easily transportable; this accords with its original function for magisterial and promagisterial commanders in the field. It developed a hieratic significance, expressed in fictive curule seats on funerary monuments, a symbol of power which was never entirely lost in post-Roman European tradition. 6th-century consular ivory diptychs of Orestes and of Constantinus each depict the consul seated on an elaborate curule seat with crossed animal legs.

As a form of throne, the sella might be given as an honor to foreign kings recognized formally as allies by the Roman people or Senate. The ivory curule seat specifically was used as an honorary gift which was sent to foreign kings by the senate of Rome. The presentation of the insignia of royalty which included an ivory curule seat, (along with other insignia such as a scepter, golden crown, horse, armor, and embroidered robe), signified that the foreign king was worthy of this delegated power.

=== Other uses ===
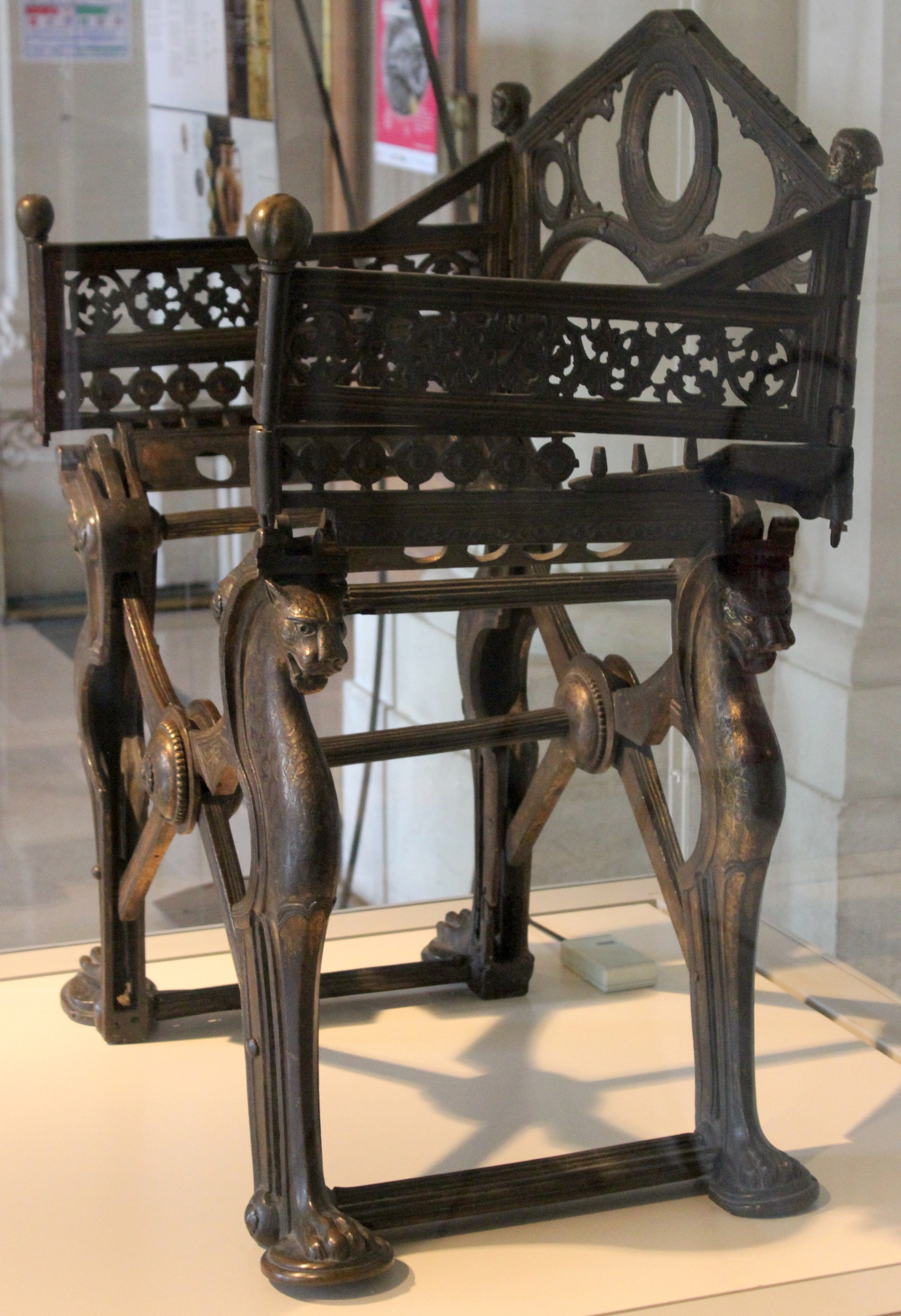
The throne of Dagobert

Folding chairs of foreign origin were mentioned in China by the 2nd century AD, possibly related to the curule seat. These chairs were called hu chuang ("barbarian bed"), and Frances Wood argues that they came from the Eastern Roman Empire, since the cultures of Persia and Arabia preferred cushions and divans instead. A poem by Yu Jianwu, written about 552 AD, reads:

By the name handed down you are from a foreign region

coming into [China] and being used in the capital
With legs leaning your frame adjusts by itself

With limbs slanting your body levels by itself...

In Gaul the Merovingian successors to Roman power employed the curule seat as an emblem of their right to dispense justice, and their Capetian successors retained the iconic seat: the "Throne of Dagobert", of cast bronze retaining traces of its former gilding, is conserved in the Bibliothèque nationale de France. The "throne of Dagobert" is first mentioned in the 12th century, already as a treasured relic, by Abbot Suger, who claims in his Administratione, "We also restored the noble throne of the glorious King Dagobert, on which, as tradition relates, the Frankish kings sat to receive the homage of their nobles after they had assumed power. We did so in recognition of its exalted function and because of the value of the work itself." Abbot Suger added bronze upper members with foliated scrolls and a back-piece. The "Throne of Dagobert" was coarsely repaired and used for the coronation of Napoleon.

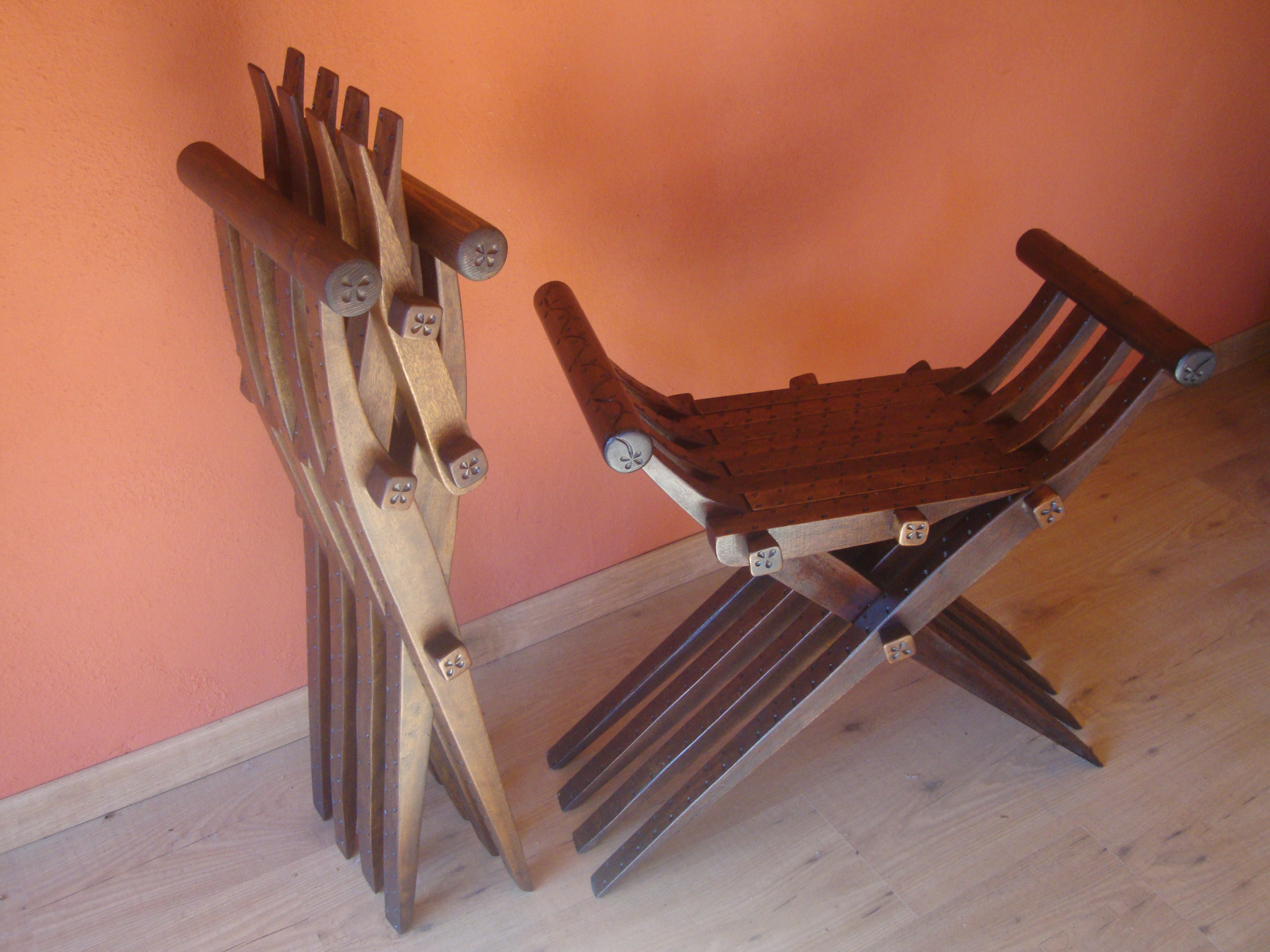
Medieval folding chairs, folded and unfolded (apparently Spanish, reconstruction).

In the 15th century, a characteristic folding-chair of both Italy and Spain was made of numerous shaped cross-framed elements, joined to wooden members that rested on the floor and further made rigid with a wooden back. 19th-century dealers and collectors termed these "Dante Chairs" or "Savonarola Chairs", with disregard to the centuries intervening between the two figures. Examples of curule seats were redrawn from a 15th-century manuscript of the Roman de Renaude de Montauban and published in Henry Shaw's Specimens of Ancient Furniture (1836).

The 15th or early 16th-century curule seat that survives at York Minster, originally entirely covered with textiles, has rear members extended upwards to form a back, between which a rich textile was stretched.

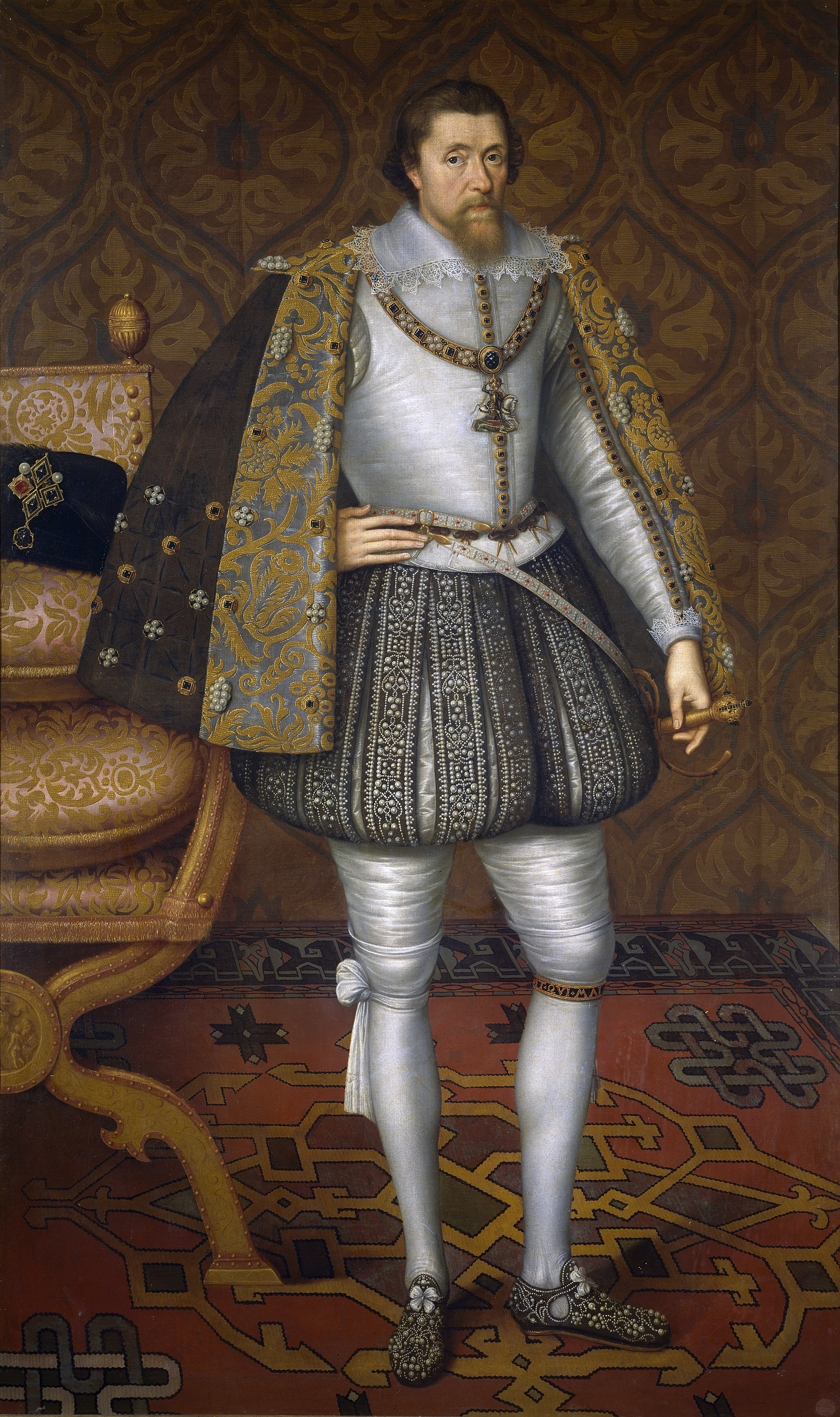
James I of England (c. 1605), attributed to John de Critz or Paul van Somer, with a royal cross-framed armchair

The cross-framed armchair, no longer actually a folding chair, continued to have regal connotations. James I of England was portrayed with such a chair, its framing entirely covered with a richly patterned silk damask textile, with decorative nailing, in Paul van Somer's portrait, and in his portrait by John de Critz. Similar early 17th-century cross-framed seats survive at Knole, perquisites from a royal event.

The photo of actor Edwin Booth as Hamlet poses him in a regal cross-framed chair, considered suitably medieval in 1870.

The form found its way into stylish but non-royal decoration in the archaeological second phase of neoclassicism in the early 19th century. An unusually early example of this revived form is provided by the large sets of richly carved and gilded pliants (folding stools) forming part of long sets with matching tabourets delivered in 1786 to the royal châteaux of Compiègne and Fontainebleau. With their Imperial Roman connotations, the backless curule seats found their way into furnishings for Napoleon, who moved some of the former royal pliants into his state bedchamber at Fontainebleau. Further examples were ordered, in the newest Empire taste: Jacob-Desmalter's seats with members in the form of carved and gilded sheathed sabres were delivered to Saint-Cloud about 1805. Cross-framed drawing-room chairs are illustrated in Thomas Sheraton's last production, The Cabinet-Maker, Upholsterer and General Artist's Encyclopaedia (1806), and in Thomas Hope's Household Furniture (1807).

With the decline of archaeological neoclassicism, the curule chair disappeared; it is not found among Biedermeier and other Late Classical furnishing schemes.

== Gallery ==
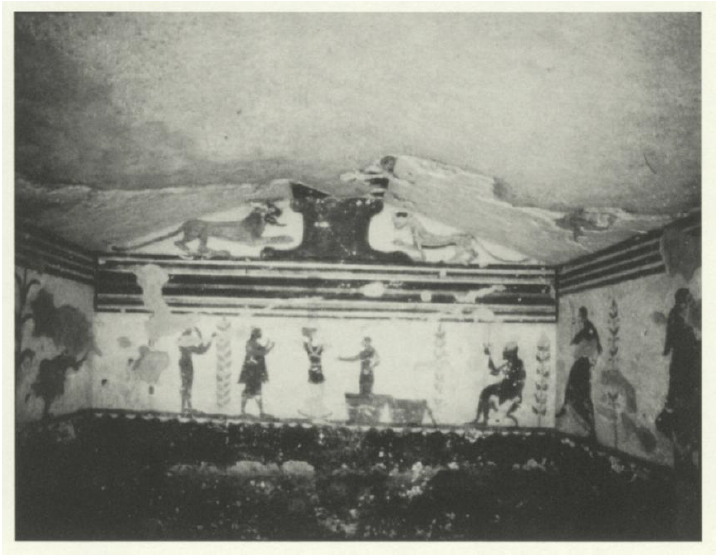
Magistrate on his sella curulis (lower right corner), Etruscan wall painting, Tomb of the Jugglers (520 BCE)

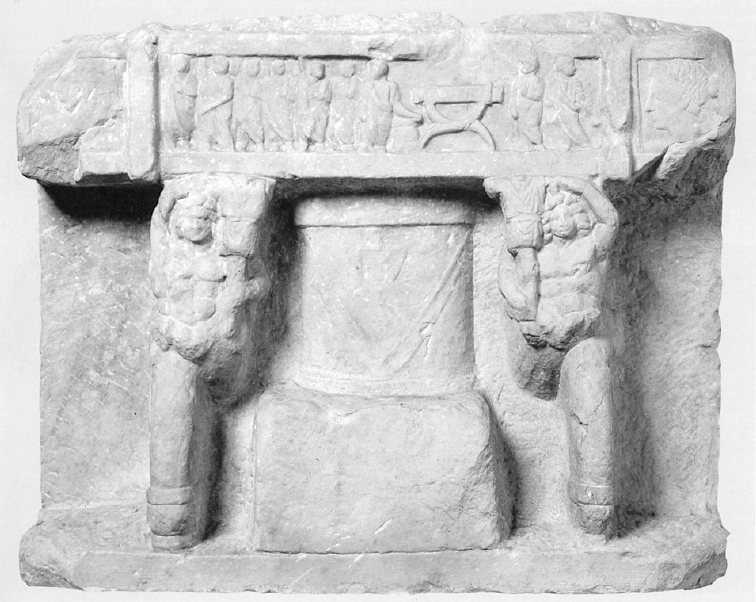
Sella curulis on a funerary monument from the Via Labicana, Rome

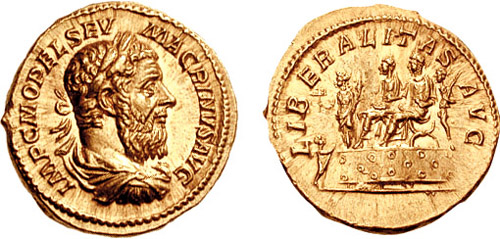
Aureus of Macrinus, with the emperor and his son sitting on curule chairs on the reverse

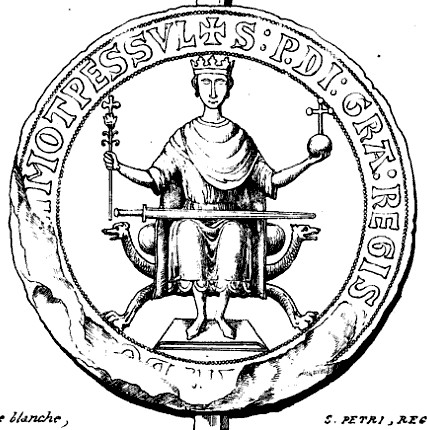
Drawing of a seal of Peter II of Aragon, ca. 1196—1213

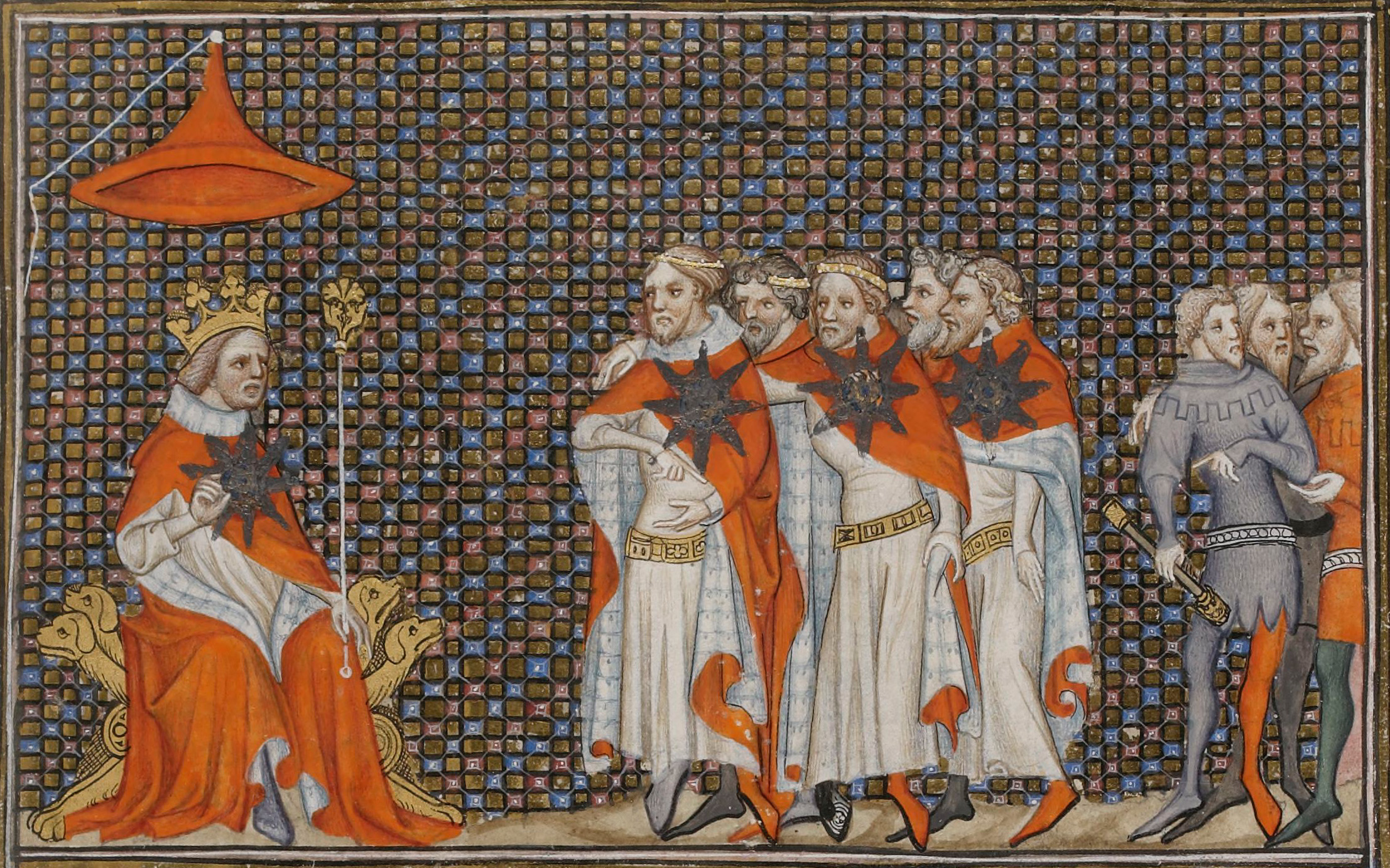
John II of France on the Throne of Dagobert adorned unusually with dogs' heads, founding the Order of the Star in 1351 (manuscript illumination, Bibliothèque nationale)

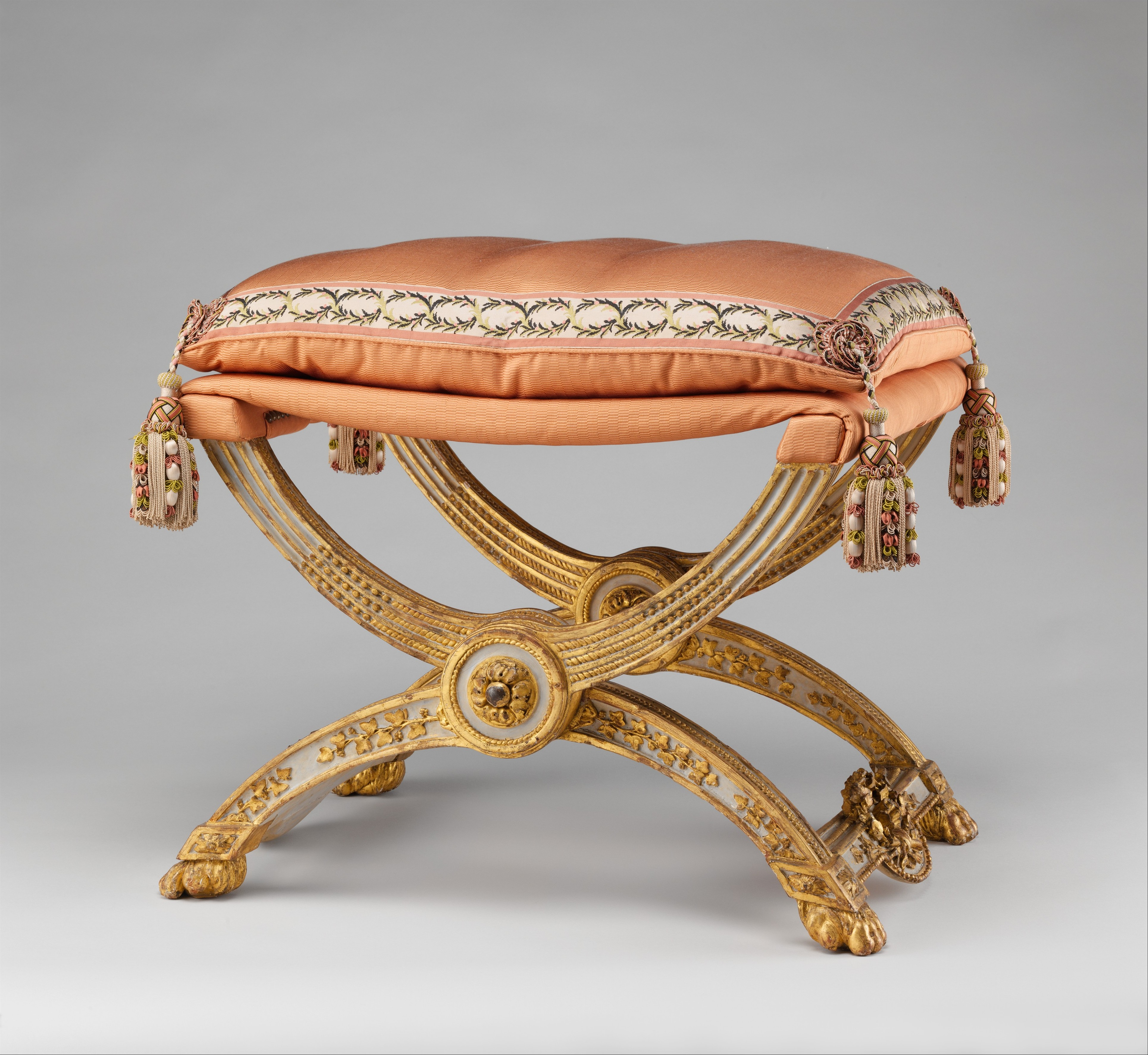
French folding stool in the curule style, by Jean-Baptiste-Claude Sené, 1786 (Metropolitan Museum of Art )

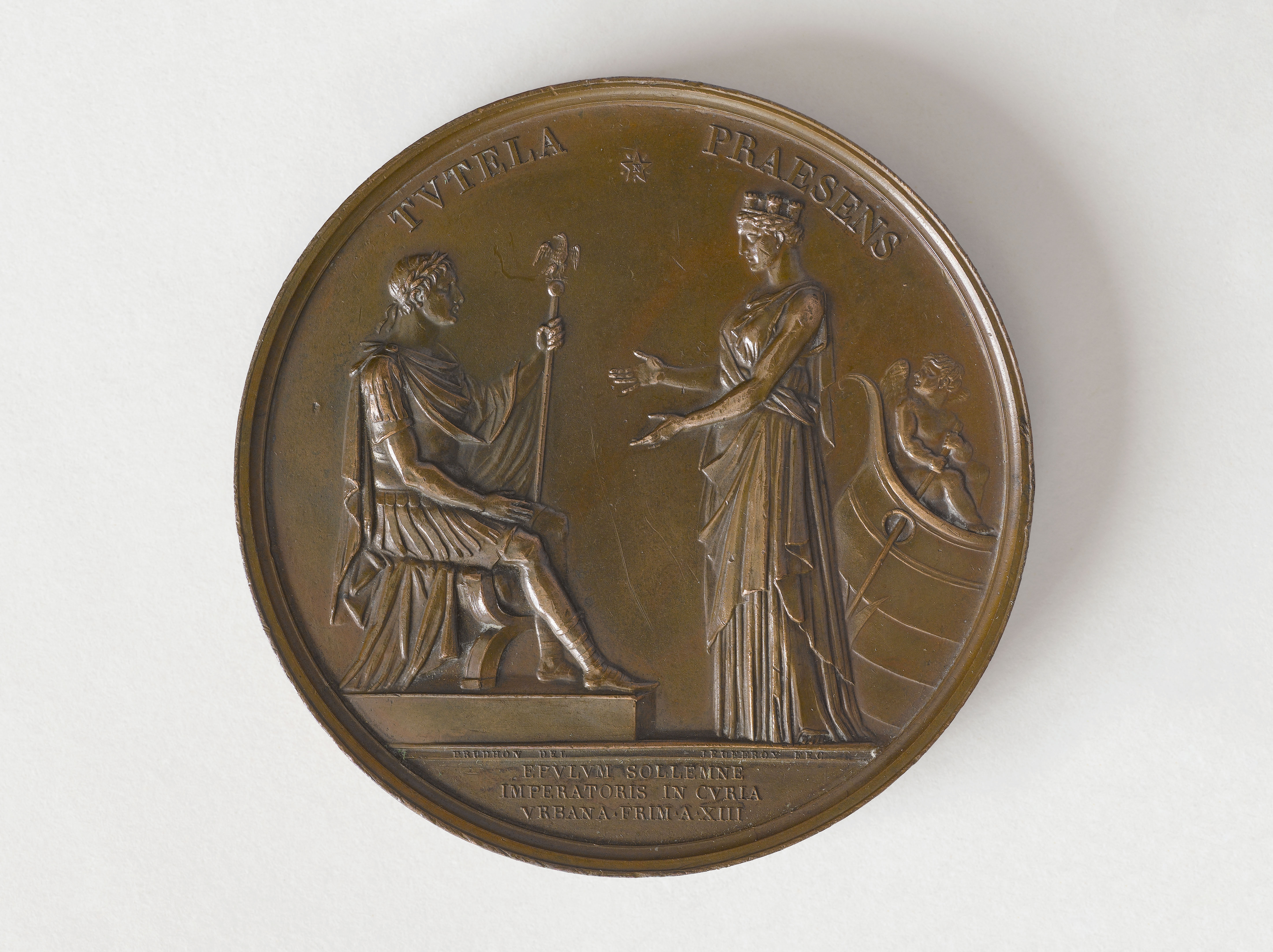
Napoleon on a curule seat with the goddess Tutela, 1804 medal by André Galle and Romain-Vincent Jeuffroy (Musée Carnavalet)

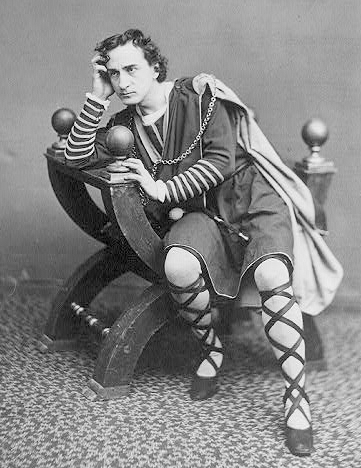
The American actor Edwin Booth as Hamlet, seated in a curule chair, c. 1870

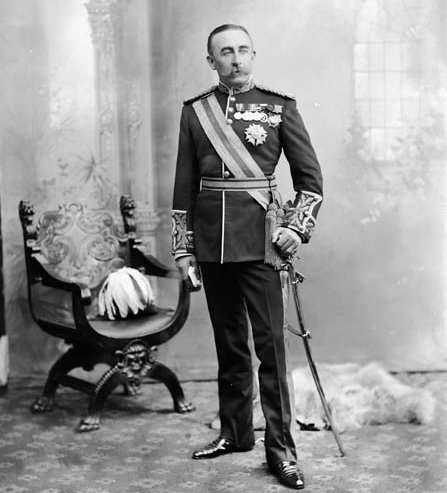
The 4th Earl of Minto, governor general of Canada, photographed by William James Topley c. 1900.

== See also ==
- Barcelona chair
- Daensen folding chair (Bronze Age)
- Faldstool
- Glastonbury chair
- List of chairs
- Magistratus Curulis
- Porter's chair
- Seat of honor
- X-chair
