= Jean-Baptiste-Claude Sené =

French furniture maker

Jean-Baptiste-Claude Séne (1747-1803) was a French furniture maker in the 18th century, primarily during the reign of Louis XVI. He came from a noted family of menuisiers, or furniture craftsmen. cabinet makers. His grandfather Jean established a workshop, which was inherited by his father Claude I (1724-1792), who earned the title of a master craftsman in 1743, and made chairs and armchairs for Louis XV. Jean-Baptiste-CLaude became a master in 1769. His younger brother, Claude II (called Sené the younger), also became a master in 1769, and both made chairs for Louis XVI.

In 1785b Jean-Baptiste-Claude received the title of fournissur to the royal furniture depot, and made chairs, armchairs, stools, fireplace screens and beds for the Palace of Versailles. the Palace of Fontainebleau, and the Palace of Saint-Cloud. His works were prominent in the private apartments of Marie-Antoinette.

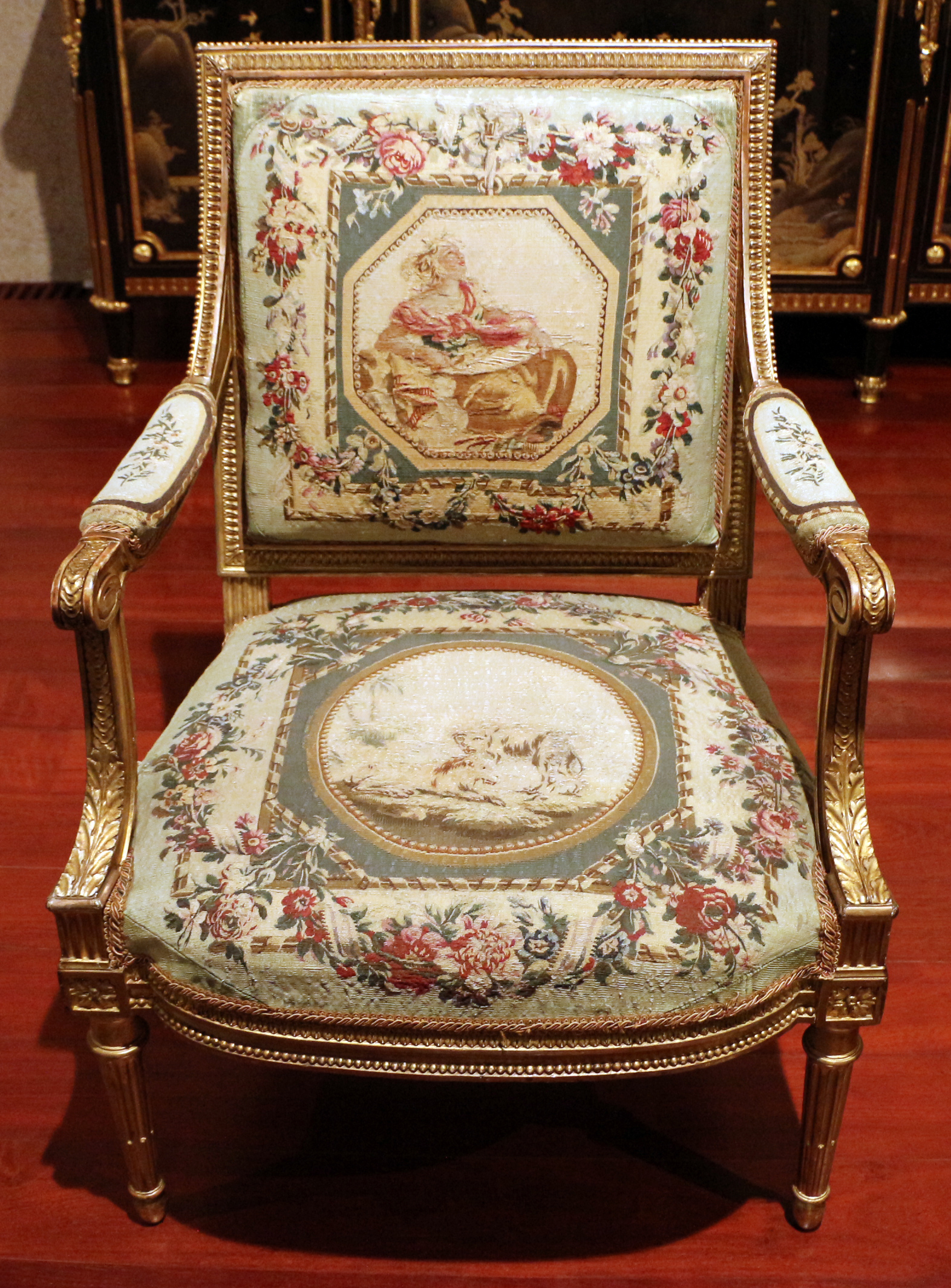
Armchair by Jean-Baptiste-Claude Sené with Beauvais tapestry upholstery (1780–85)

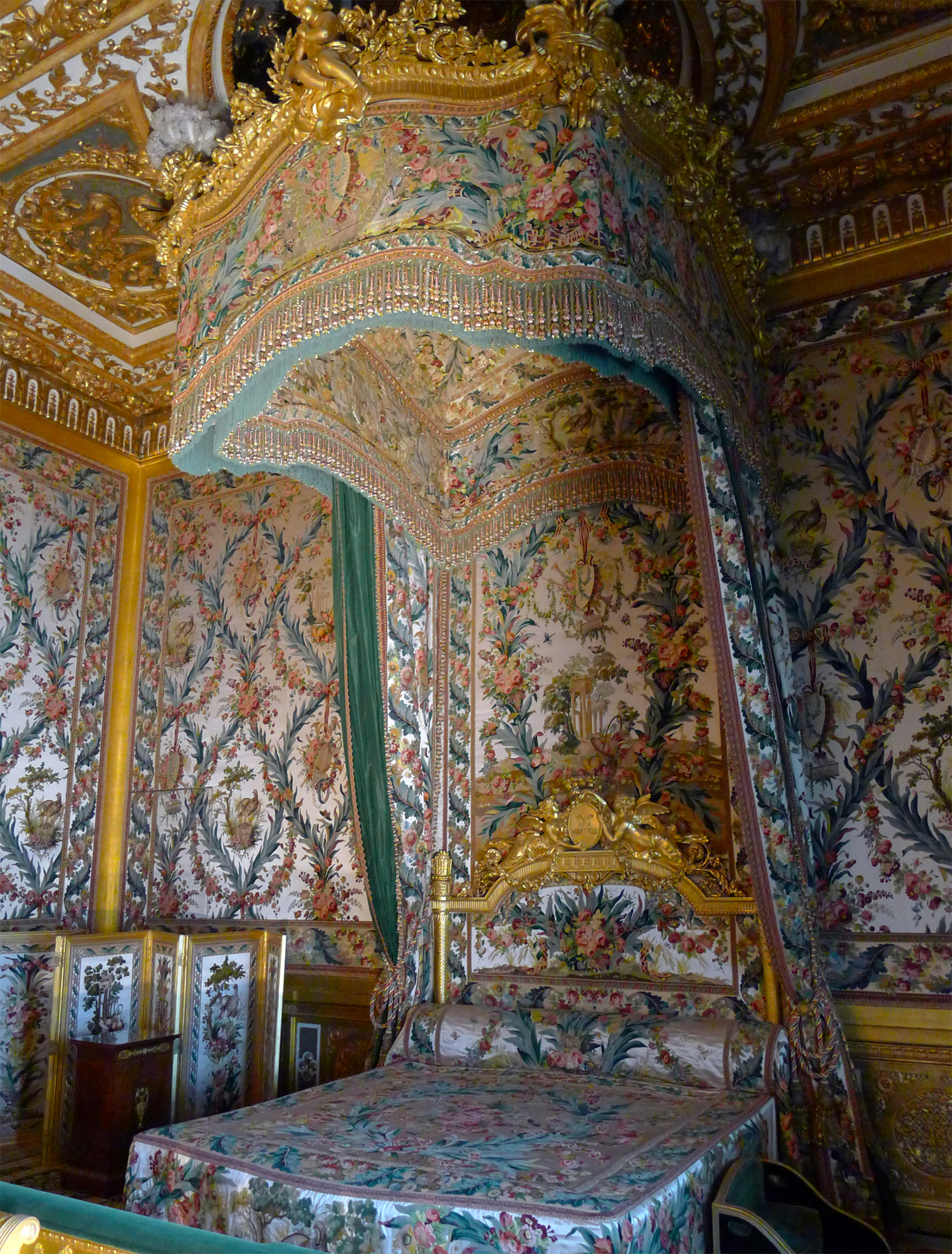
Bed of Marie Antoinette at Palace of Fontainebleau by Jean-Baptiste-Claude Sené (1787)

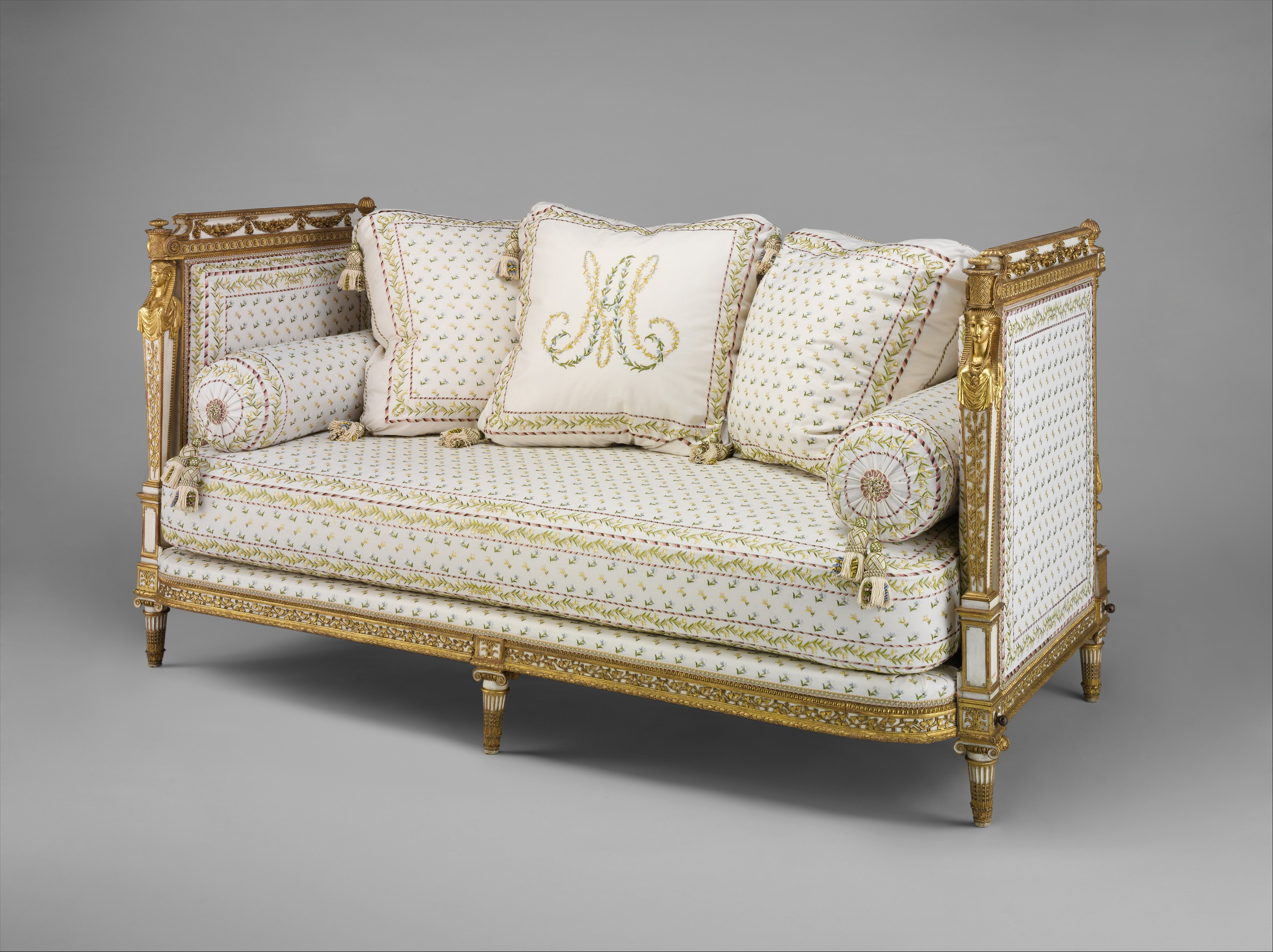
Daybed or Lit de Repos by Jean-Baptiste-Claude Sené (1788), Metropolitan Museum

== See also ==
- Louis XVI furniture
- Louis XVI style

== Bibliography ==
- De Morant, Henry (1970). Histoire des arts décoratifs (in French). Librarie Hacahette.
- Ducher, Robert (1988), Caractéristique des Styles (in French), Paris: Flammarion, ISBN 2-08-011539-1
- Renault, Christophe (2006), Les Styles de l'architecture et du mobilier (in French), Paris: Gisserot, ISBN 978-2-877-4746-58
- Wiegant, Claude-Paul (1995), Le Mobilier Français- Transition Louis XVI (in French), Paris: Massin, ISBN 2-7072-0281-9
- Lovreglio, Aurélia and Anne (2006), Dictionnaire des Mobiliers et des Objets d'art du Moyen Âge au XXIe siècle (in French), Paris: Le Robert, ISBN 2-84902-079-6
