= Barcelona chair =

Chair by Mies van der Rohe, Lilly Reich

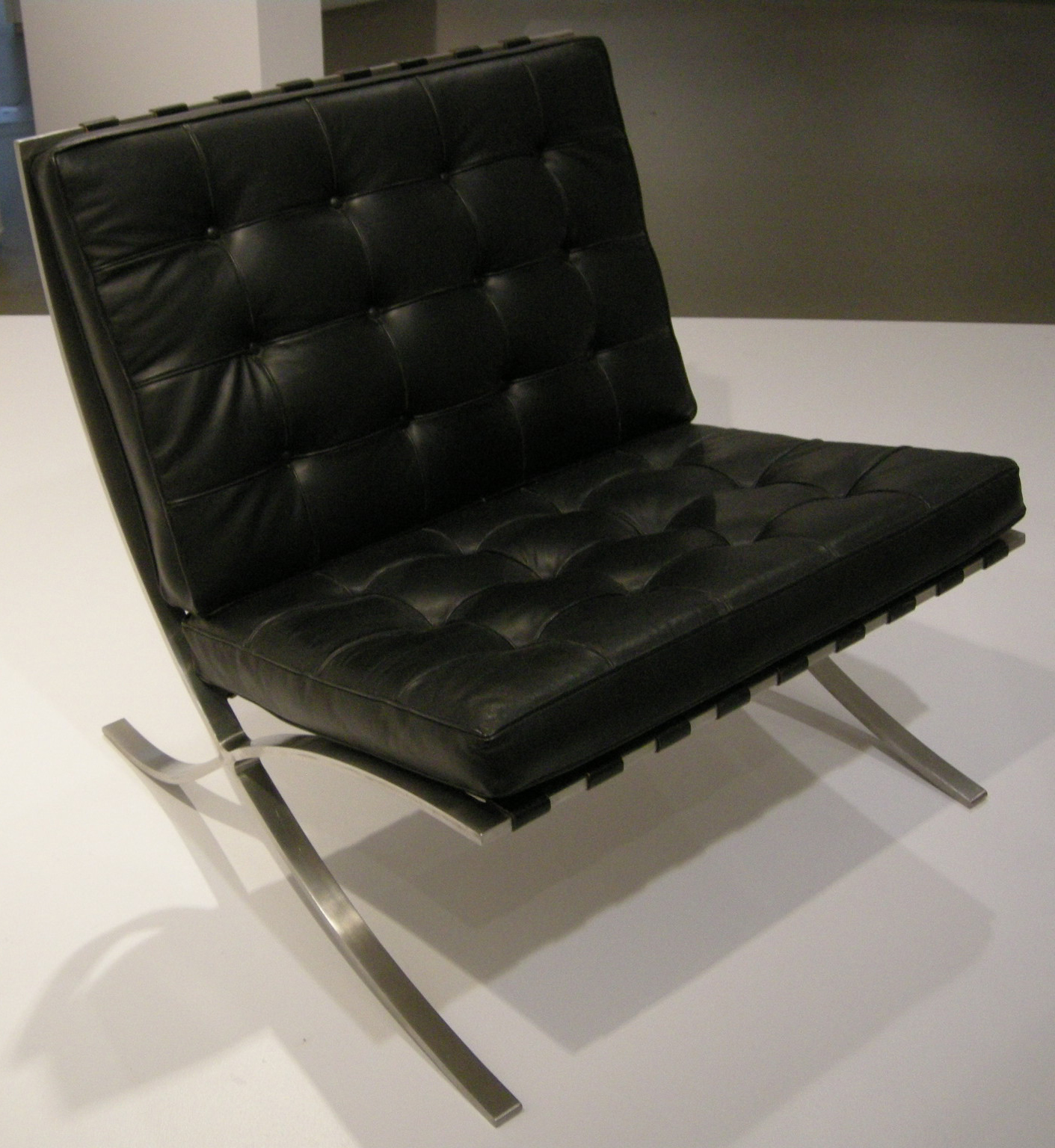
- Designer: Ludwig Mies van der Rohe and Lilly Reich
- Date: 1929
- Materials: Chrome on steel frame. Leather cushions filled with foam
- Style / tradition: Modernist
- Height: 75 cm (30 in)
- Width: 75 cm (30 in)
- Depth: 75 cm (30 in)

The Barcelona chair is a chair designed by Ludwig Mies van der Rohe and Lilly Reich for the German Pavilion at the International Exposition of 1929, hosted in Barcelona, Catalonia, Spain. Knoll Inc. has manufactured the chair since 1964, although the chair was not known as the Barcelona chair until 1987, when Knoll named the chair based on its resemblance to furniture used at the German Pavilion.

== Materials and manufacture ==
The frame was initially designed to be bolted together, but was redesigned in 1950 using stainless steel, which allowed the frame to be formed with a seamless piece of metal, giving it a smoother appearance. Bovine leather replaced the ivory-colored pigskin, which was used for the original pieces.

== Philosophy and ergonomics ==
Although many architects and furniture designers of the Bauhaus era were intent on providing well-designed homes and impeccably manufactured furnishings for common people, the Barcelona chair was an exception. It was designed for Spanish royalty to oversee the opening ceremonies of the exhibition and was described by Time magazine as inhabiting a "sumptuous German pavilion." The form is thought to be extrapolated from Roman folding chairs known as the Curule chair – upholstered stools used by the Roman aristocracy. According to Knoll Inc., despite its industrial appearance, the Barcelona chair requires much handcrafting.

== Current production ==
Since 1964, Knoll Inc has manufactured the Barcelona chair in both chrome and stainless steel. The chairs are almost entirely handcrafted, and each carries a facsimile of van der Rohe's signature, stamped into its frame.

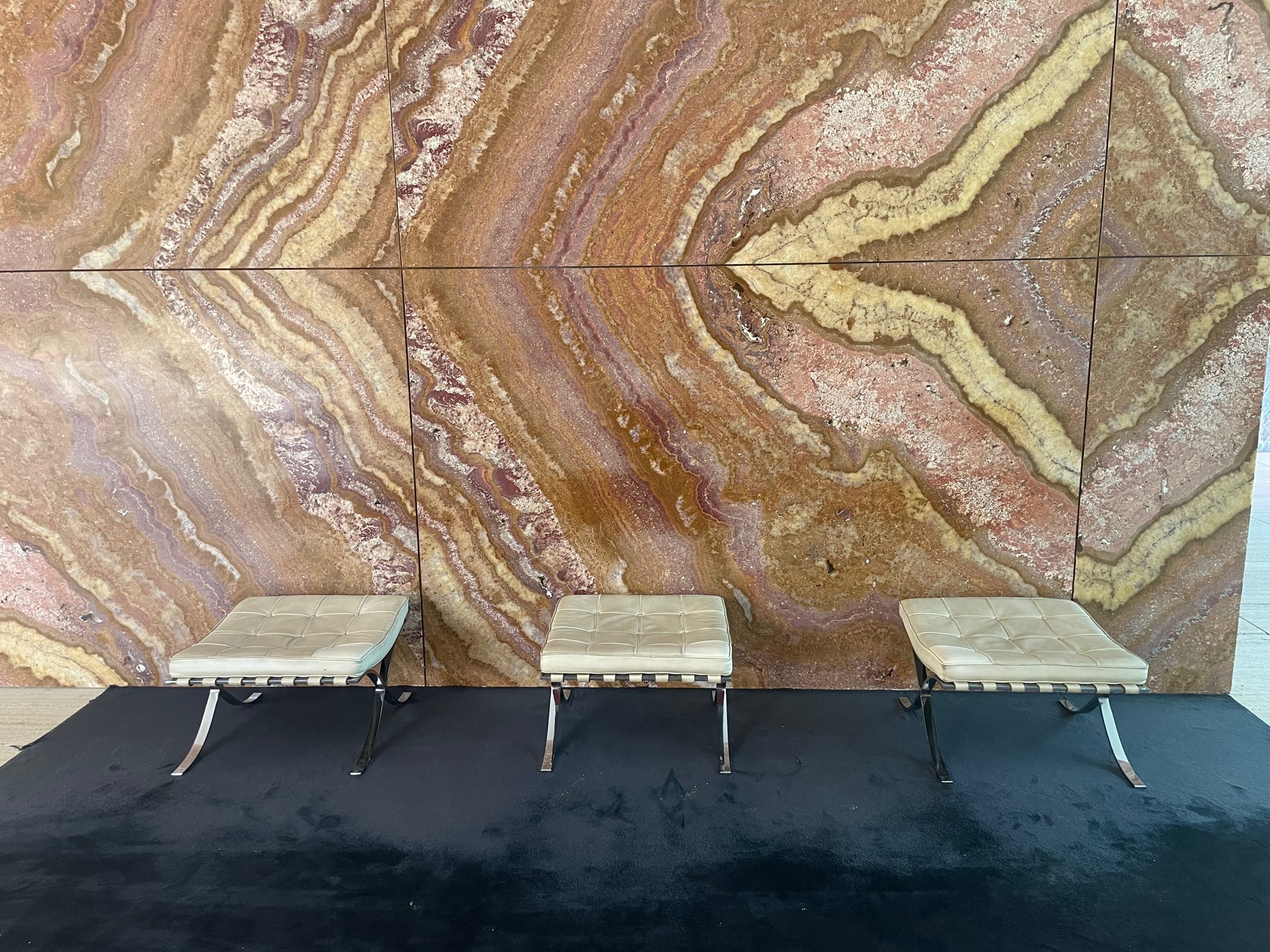
Barcelona Ottoman in situ at the reconstructed Barcelona Pavilion

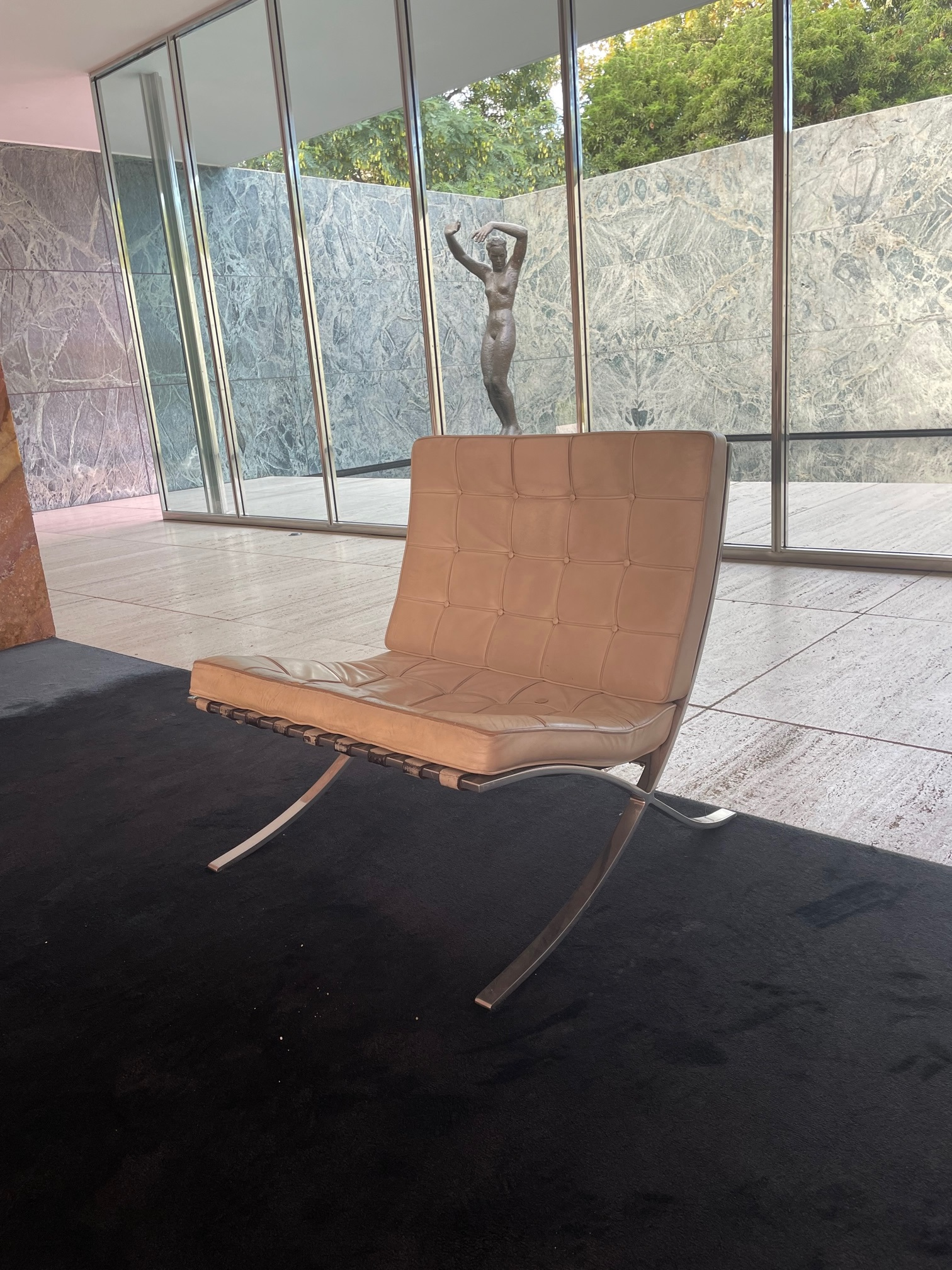
Barcelona Chair in situ at the reconstructed Barcelona Pavilion

Unlicensed replicas of the original design are manufactured by other companies worldwide and sold under various marketing names. Such designs are frequently subject to legal challenges.

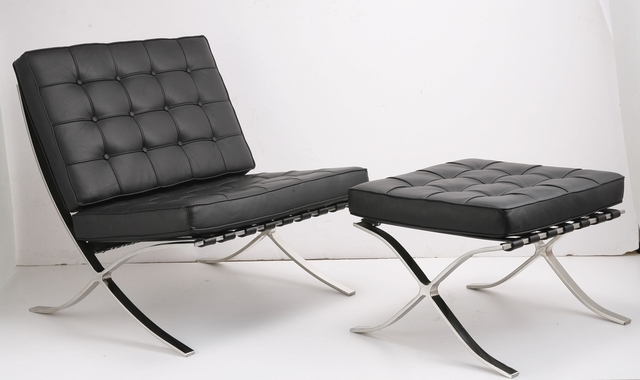
Unlicensed replicas

== In popular culture ==
In his 1981 book about modern architecture, From Bauhaus to Our House, Tom Wolfe called the Barcelona chair "the Platonic ideal of the chair", and wrote that, despite its high price, owning one had become a necessity for young architects: "When you saw the holy object on the sisal rug, you knew you were in a household where a fledgling architect and his young wife had sacrificed everything to bring the symbol of the godly mission into their home."

== See also ==
- Barcelona Pavilion
- Bauhaus
- List of chairs
- List of furniture designers
- Ludwig Mies van der Rohe
- X-chair
