= Watchman's chair =

Chair with forward slanted seat

A watchman's chair is a design of unupholstered wood construction featuring a forward slanted seat, such that the watchman could not readily fall asleep without sliding downward and off the front of the chair.

== Design ==
The design was developed in Western Europe, and was used from late medieval times well into the 19th century.

Currently this antique furniture item is found primarily in the possession of collectors and museums.

== In literature ==
There are a number of references to the watchman's chair in literature such as the allusion to its use in Collins's Jezebel.

Sir Toby was described to be sitting in a canopied watchman's chair in one of Shakespeare's plays.

== See also ==
- Curule chair
- Turned chair
- Acapulco Chair
