= X-chair =

Medieval and Renaissance chair with an X-shaped frame

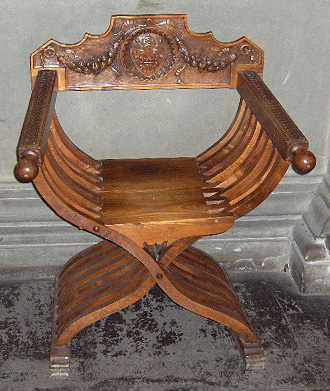
Cross-framed chair in Palazzo Vecchio, Florence

An X-chair (also scissors chair, Dante chair or Savonarola chair) is a chair with an X-shaped frame. It was known to have been used in Ancient Egypt, Rome, and Greece. The Christian faldstool is a type of X-chair.

== History ==
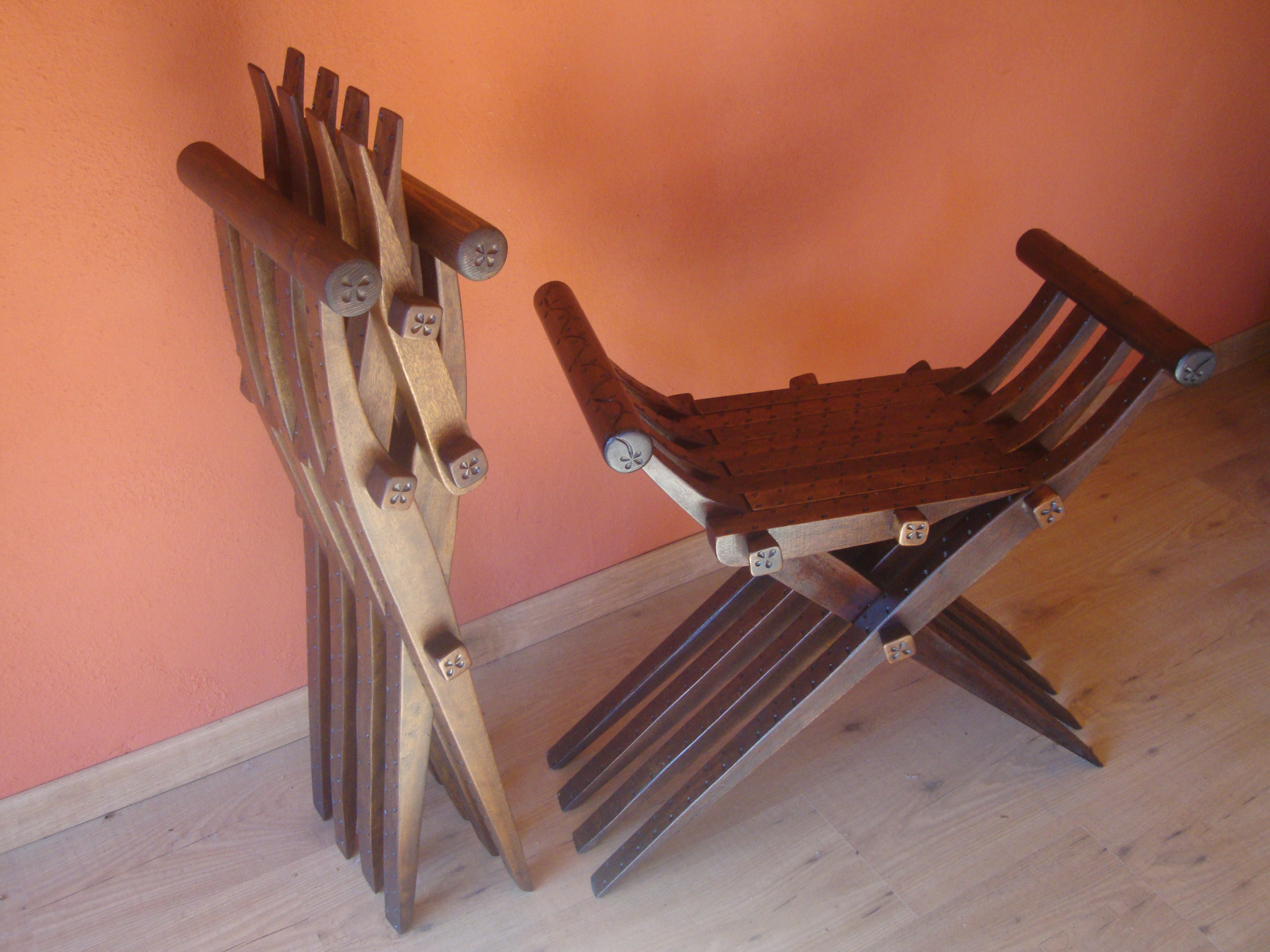
Reconstruction medieval faldstools, folded and unfolded

X-chairs have been found in ancient Egyptian tombs, often featuring carvings in the shape of animals or animal-skin draperies. Roman X-chairs are believed to have been used by magistrates and nobles.

A type of folding chair with a frame like an X viewed from the front or the side originated in medieval Italy. Also known as a Savonarola or Dante chair in Italy, or a Luther chair in Germany, the X-chair was a light and practical form that spread through Renaissance Europe. In England, the Glastonbury chair made an X-shape by crossing the front and back legs, while in Spain X-chairs were inlaid with ivory and metals in the Moorish designs.

The use of the name Savonarola chair comes from a nineteenth-century trade term evoking Girolamo Savonarola, which is a folding armchair of the type standardized during the Italian Renaissance.

The chair in the illustration consists of a wooden flat-arched back rail carved with a coat-of-arms in low relief and connected to the back of the straight arms of the chair and a seat made of narrowly fitted wooden slats. The wood used in the construction of the chair is the typical walnut, as in other gothic and renaissance furniture.

== Design ==
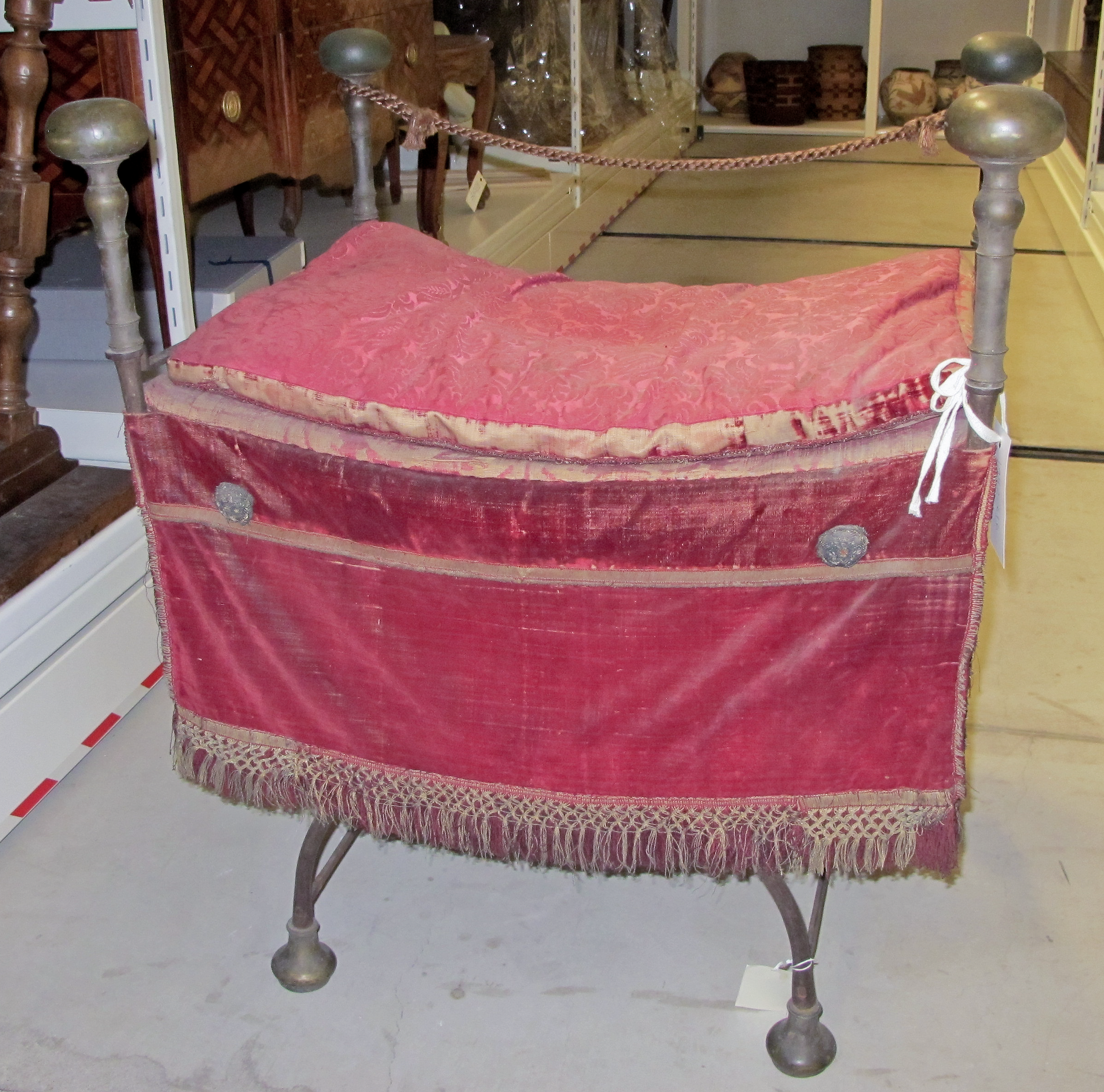
Ecclesiastical faldstool, mid-2nd-millennium

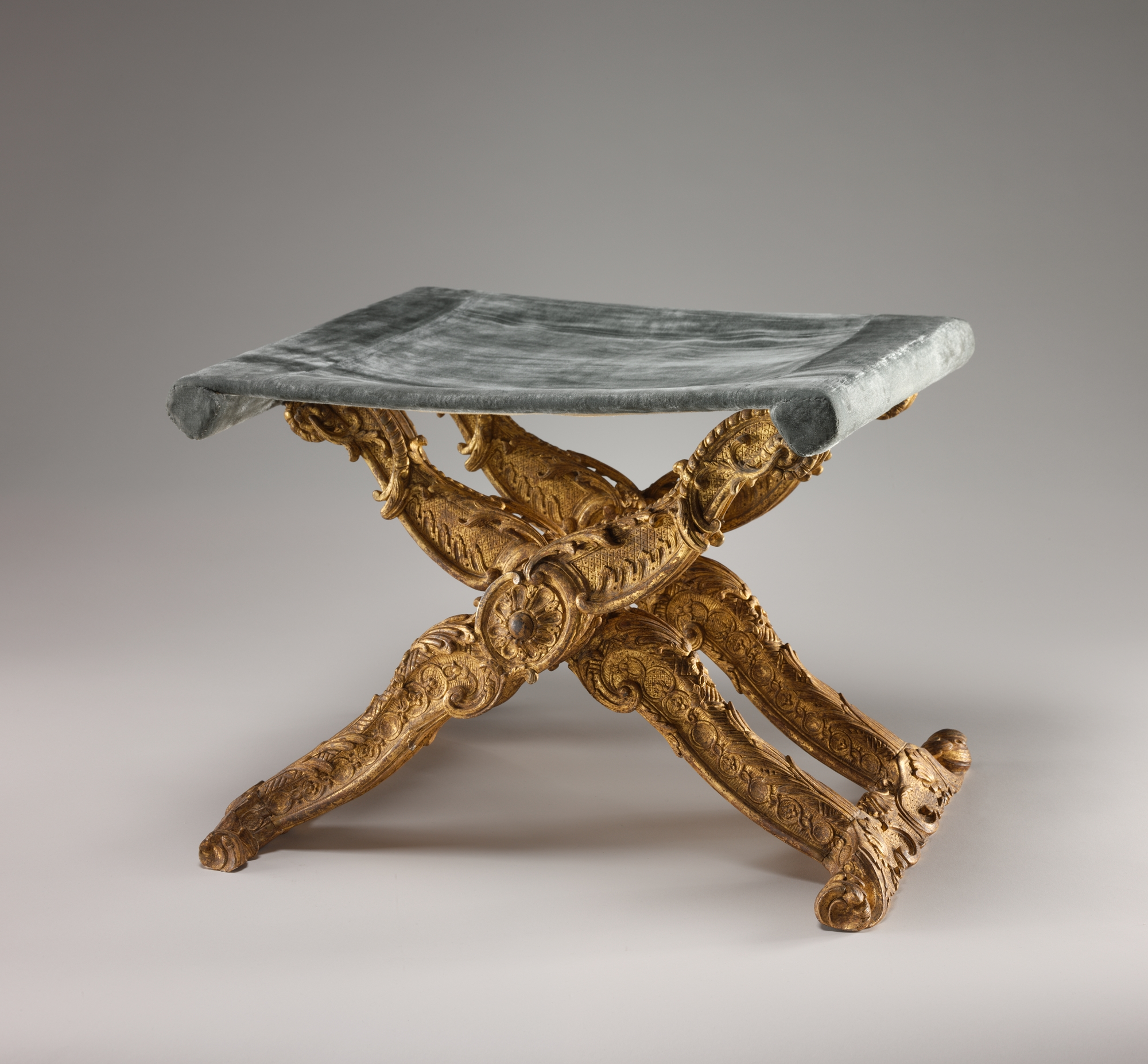
Rococo stool. Paris, France, late 1730s

The woodwork was nearly always completely covered with silk or velvet, and the seat was made up of loose cushions resting on the webbing between the side rails of the frames. The form was revived in the Neo-classical period (began c. 1760). It features in Thomas Sheraton's 1803 Cabinet Directory. It continued through the 19th century as a folding portable chair for use during campaigns or other outdoor pursuits.

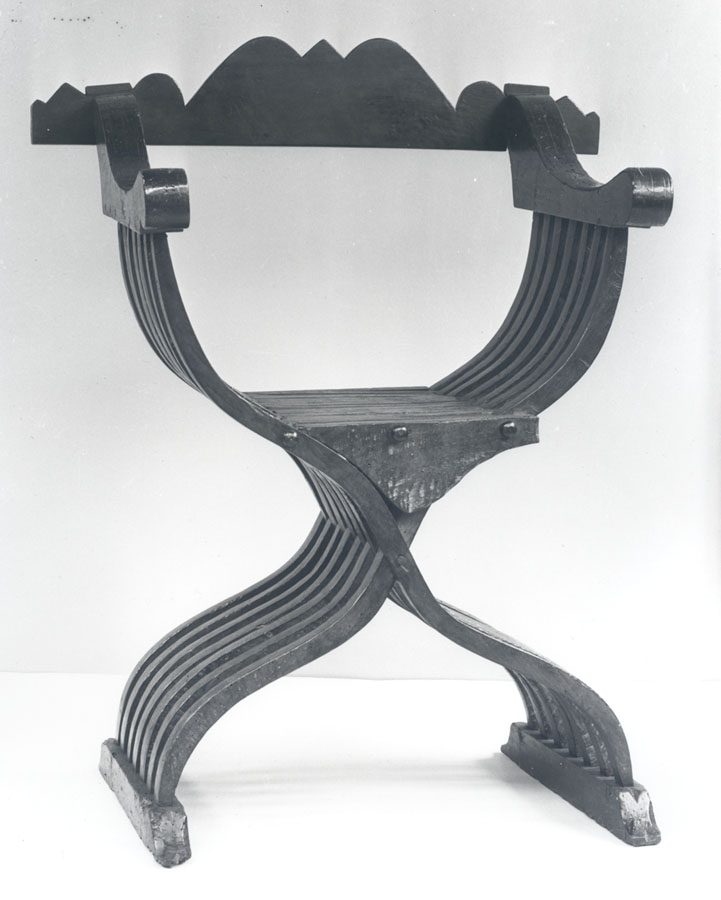
Savonarola Chair MET cds37-80-18

== Dantesca ==
Dantesca is a type of chair used during the Italian Renaissance. The arms end in scrolls and continue all the way up to the back support. It is made to look like it can fold, but in reality, it cannot. It always has a leather seat and back support. It also has a boss where the legs intersect.

== See also ==
- Curule seat
- Faldstool
- List of chairs
