= Adirondack chair =

Lounge chair with wide armrests and tall slatted back

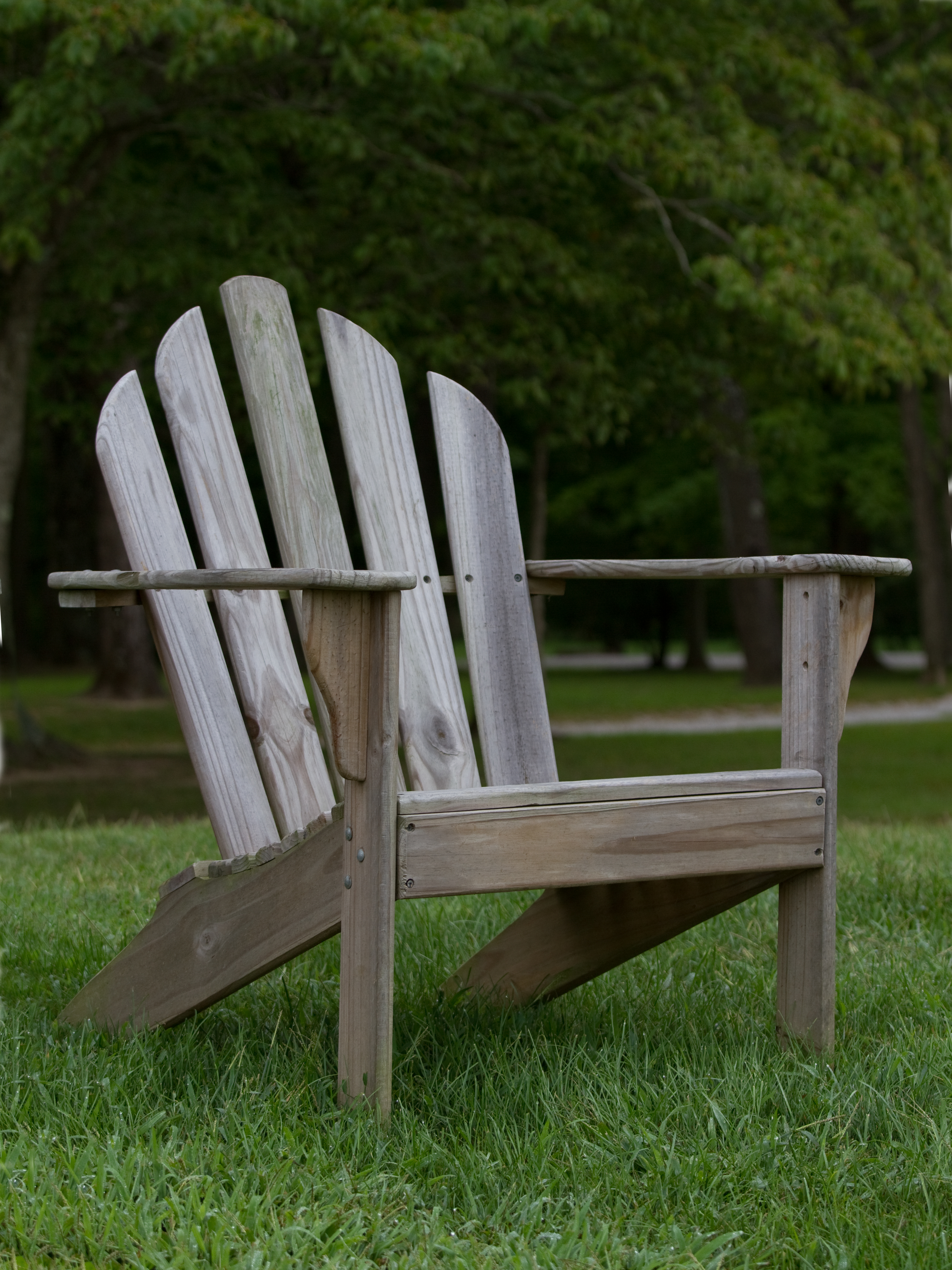
- Classic chair with a flat back and angled, contoured seat
- Designer: Thomas Lee and Harry C. Bunnell
- Materials: Wood (original) wood, plastic, metal (contemporary)

The Adirondack chair is an outdoor lounge chair with wide armrests, a tall slatted back, and a seat that is higher in the front than the back. Its name references the Adirondack Mountains in Upstate New York.

The chair was invented by Thomas Lee between 1900 and 1903 in Westport, New York which is located in Adirondack Park, but the chair was patented by his friend Harry C. Bunnell, who added some minor adaptations to make it more suitable for convalescents. The chairs were popularized in nearby tuberculosis sanatoriums, where they were favored for the way the armrests helped open up the sitter's chest. The Lee–Bunnell chair, however, had a single plank for the chair back; it was not until 1938 that the fan-shaped back with slats was patented by Irving Wolpin. Adirondack chairs are now often made by injection molding and can take any form.

Since the 1980s, they are generally marketed in Canada as "Muskoka chairs", although the design did not originate in Muskoka.

== Gallery ==
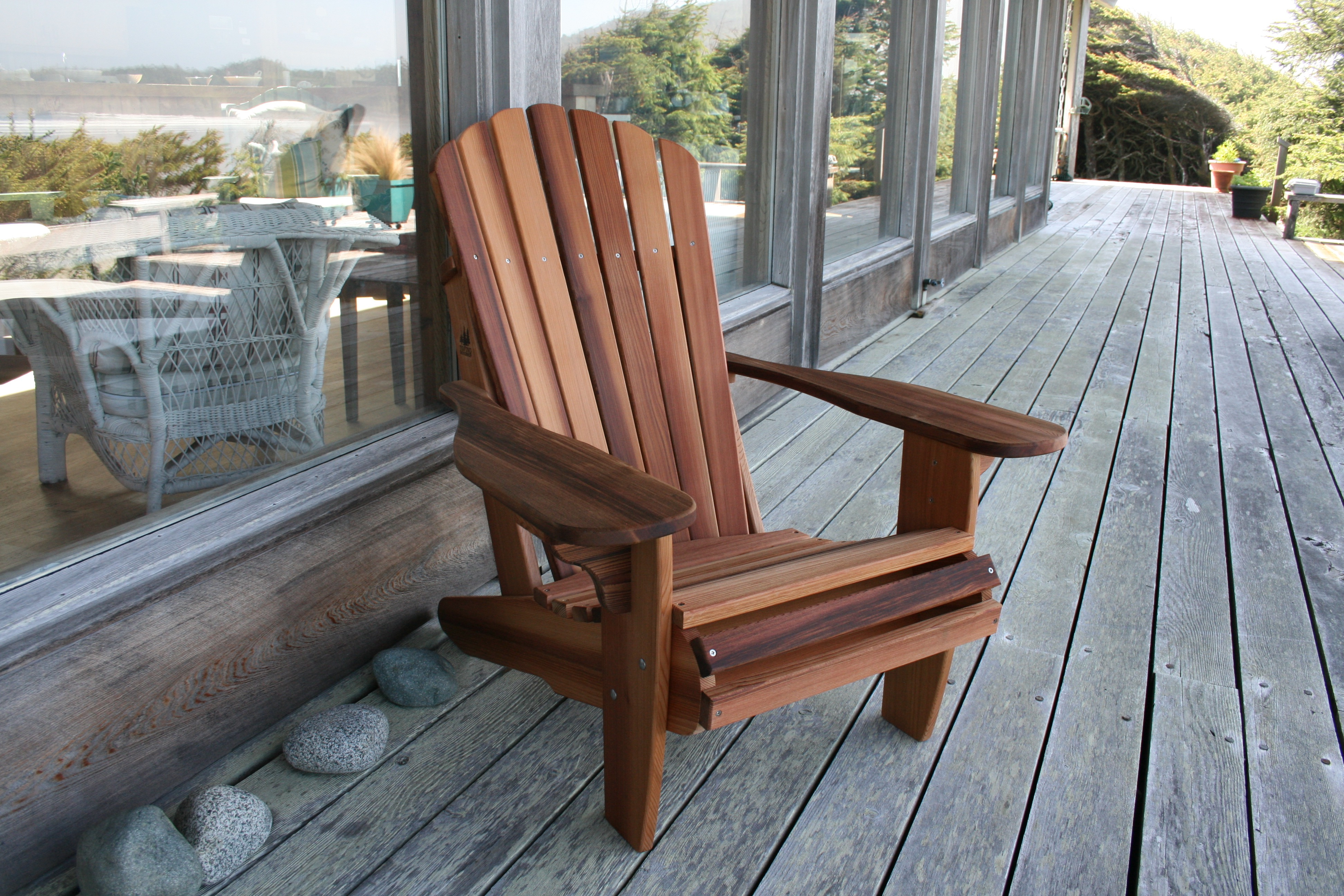
A modern curved back example in Tofino, British Columbia, Canada

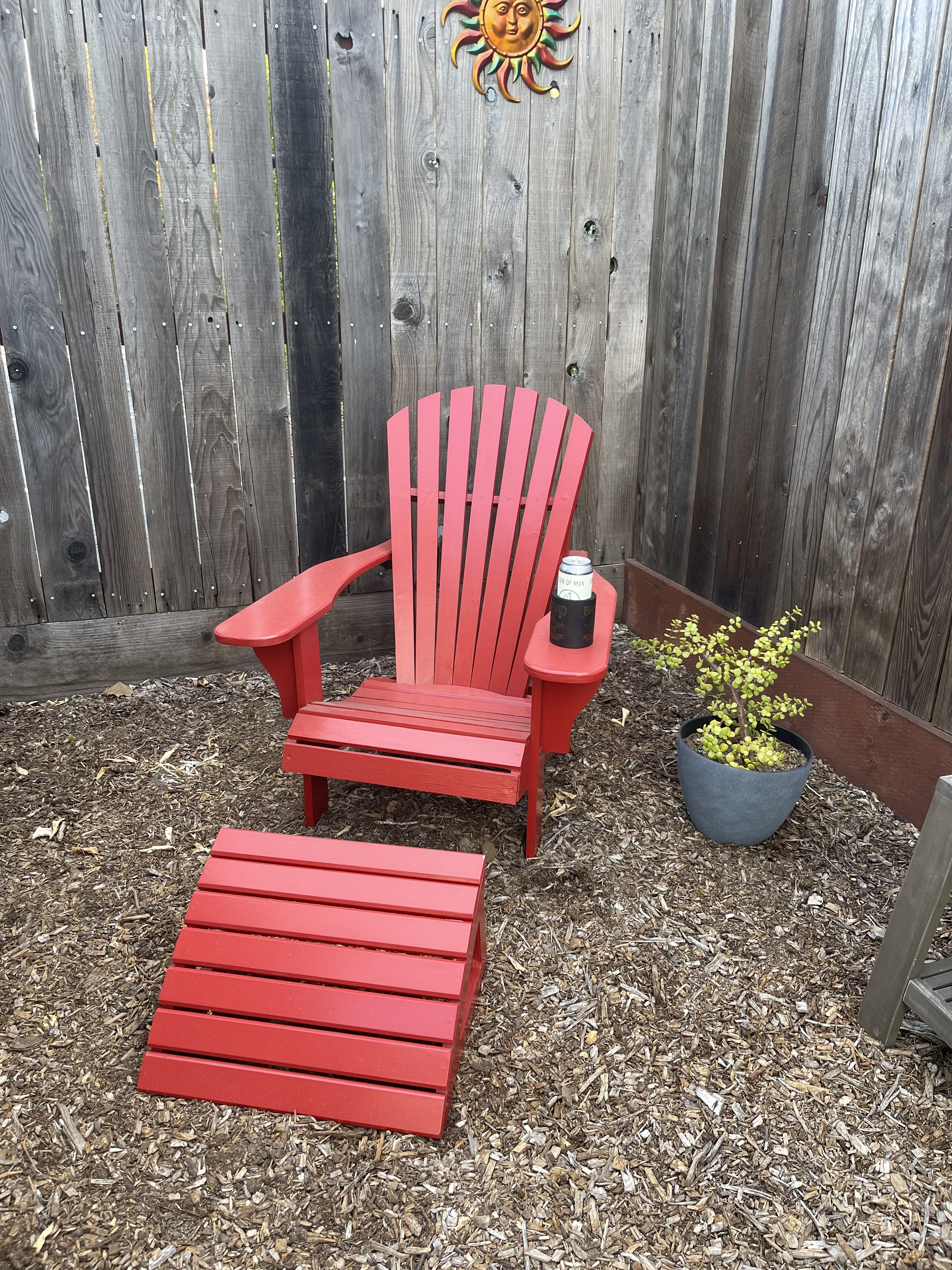
Red chair with foot rest

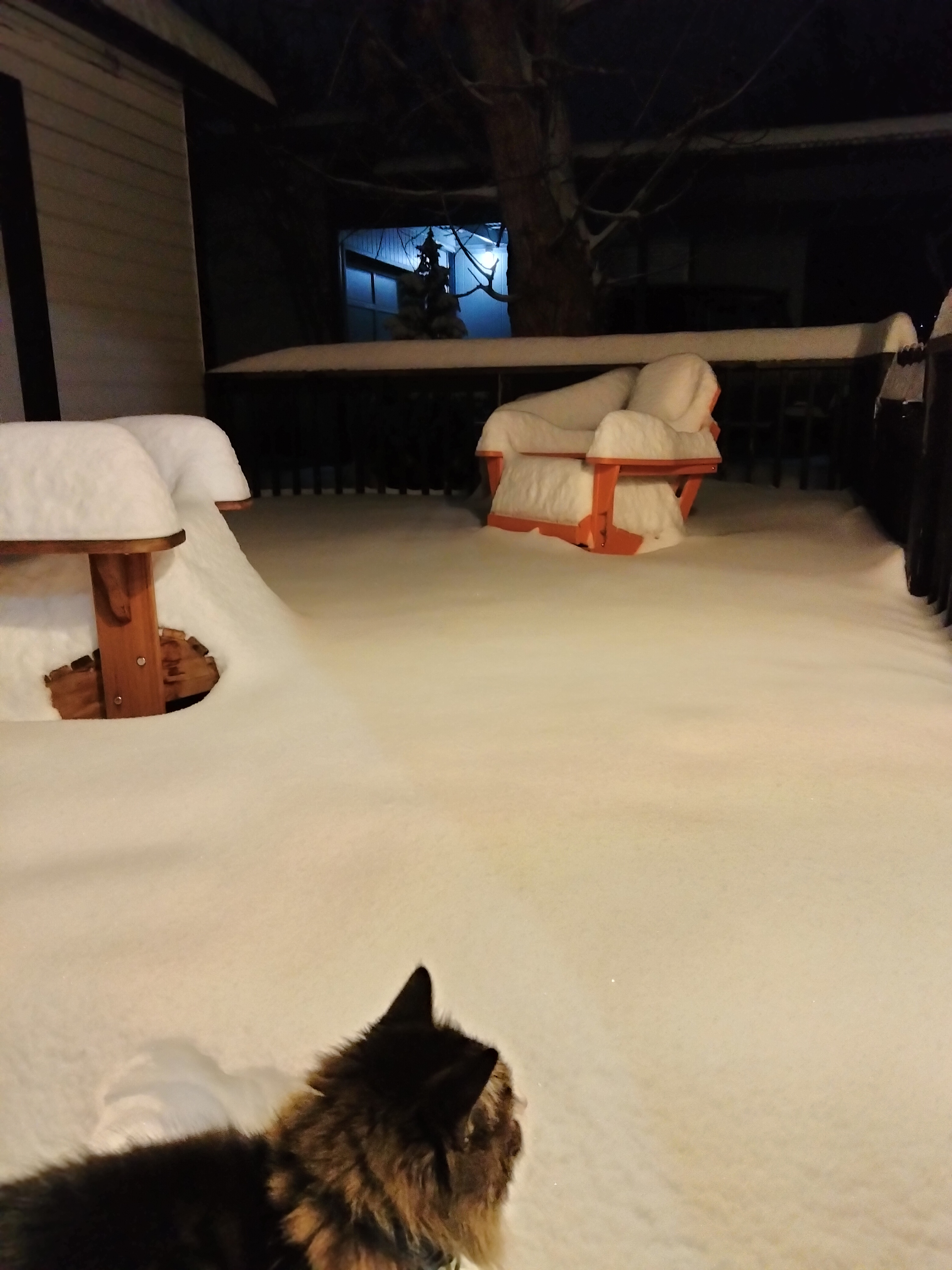
Durable cedar and orange plastic chairs in 20 cm of snow, Boise, Idaho

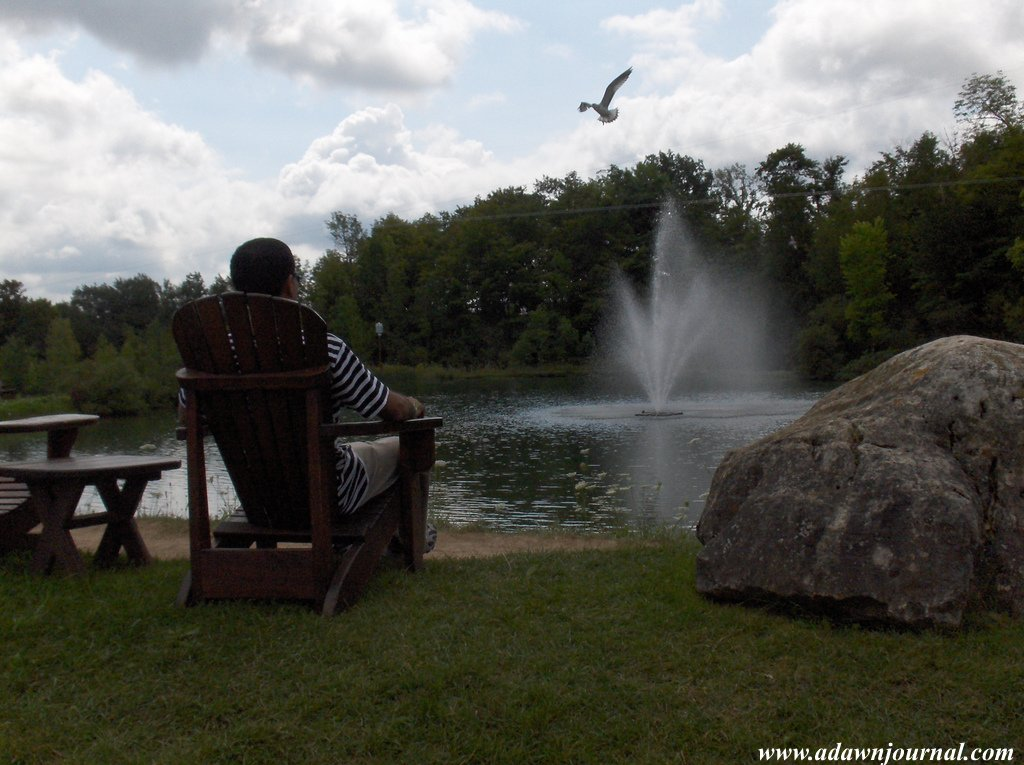
At a picnic site

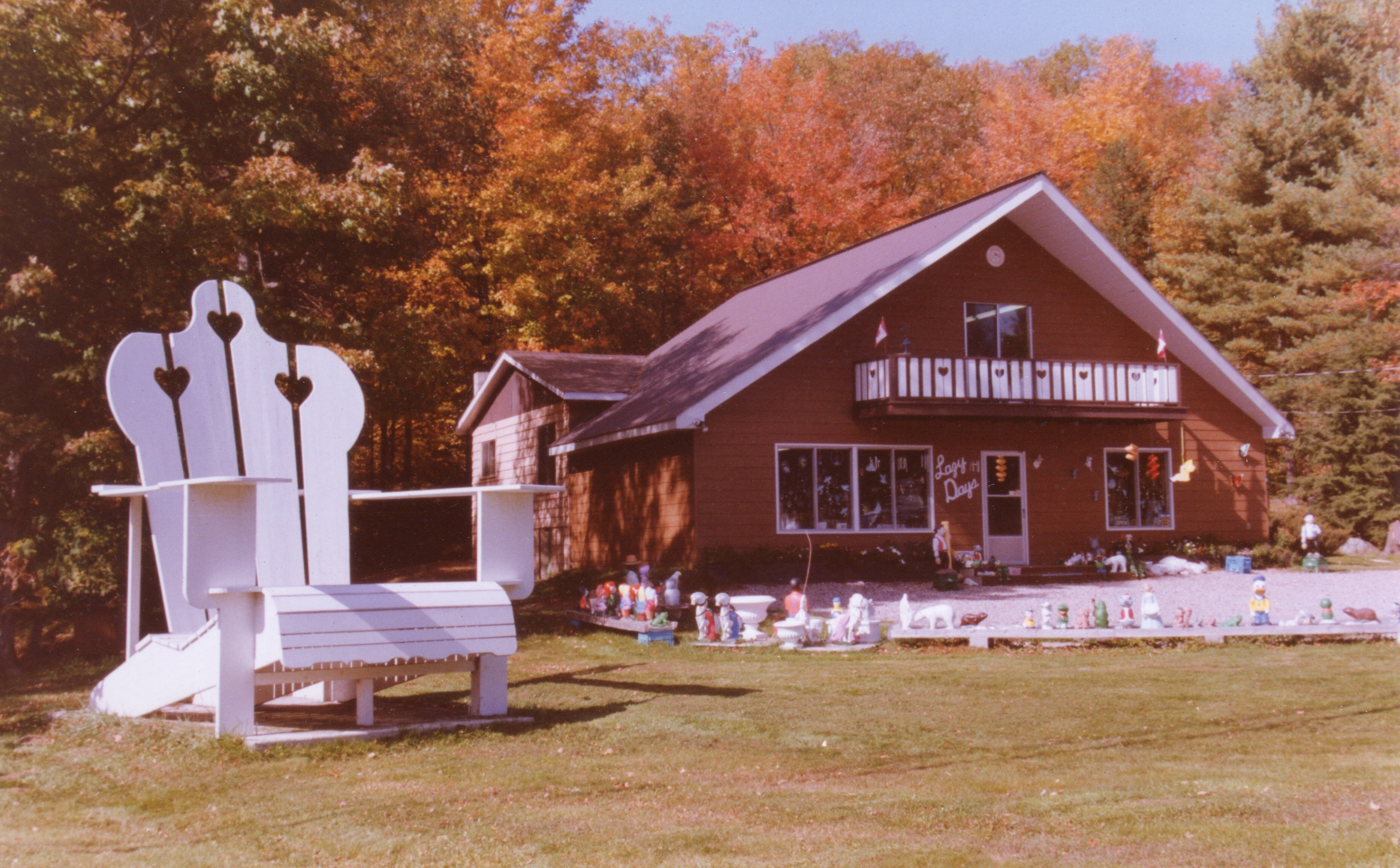
Ornate 15 feet (4.6 m) chair as tourist attraction, maintained with a 1 imperial gallon (4.5 L) of both primer and paint annually. North of Cloyne, Ontario, Canada

== See also ==
- List of chairs
