= Stool =

Stool may refer to:

- Stool (seat), a type of seat without back support or arm rests
  - Bar stool
  - Footstool
- Stool, feces
  - Human feces, more commonly called "stool"
  - Stool test, the collection and analysis of fecal matter to diagnose the presence or absence of a medical condition
- Stool, a living stump of a tree, capable of producing sprouts or cuttings
- Stool (hieroglyph), an alphabetic uniliteral sign of ancient Egypt

== See also ==
- Golden Stool, throne of kings of the Ashanti people
- Groom of the Stool, the most intimate of an English monarch's courtiers
- Informant, sometimes called a "stool pigeon" or "stoolie"
