= Salon suite =

Beauty industry business model

A salon suite (also known as a studio salon, salon studio, or beauty suite) is a business model in the beauty and personal care industry in which individual beauty professionals lease private beauty salon spaces within a larger shared facility. Unlike traditional commission-based salons, salon suite operators provide independently operated studios that allow hairstylists, estheticians, nail technicians, massage therapists, and other beauty professionals to operate their own businesses while sharing common amenities and infrastructure.

== History ==
The salon suite concept emerged in the United States during the 1990s as an alternative to traditional commission-based salons and booth-rental arrangements. In this model, beauty professionals lease private studios within a larger shared facility while independently operating their own businesses.

A 1997 article in Nail Pro magazine identified "studio salons" as a distinct category of salon ownership alongside booth rental and traditional storefront salons.

Among the early documented operators of the model was Studio Salons, a Chicago area company later renamed Gallery Salons. A 1996 Arlington Heights (IL) Daily Herald article described Studio Salons as a "mini-mall of hair salons" consisting of independently operated salon suites leased by individual stylists.

Industry surveys list salon suites as one of the biggest, fastest growing trends in the beauty industry.

== Business model ==
Salon suite facilities typically consist of multiple enclosed studios or suites within a larger shared commercial property. Operators generally provide turn-key equipped salon suites, including styling chairs, stations, shampoo stations and storage inside the suite. They also typically provide shared utilities, reception areas, laundry facilities, security, and maintenance services.

Beauty professionals leasing suites independently operate their own businesses, set pricing, manage scheduling, and maintain direct client relationships. The model differs from traditional salon employment structures in which stylists work as employees or commission-based contractors under centralized salon management.

== Industry growth ==
The salon suite industry experienced significant growth in the United States during the 2000s and 2010s. While the concept initially developed through independent regional operators, such as Studio Salons (now Gallery Salons), the concept was expanded by multi-location franchisors including Sola Salons, Salon Lofts, Phenix Salon Suites, My Salon Suite, Salons by JC, and IMAGE Studios. Business publications such as Forbes described salon suites as a model that enabled beauty professionals to operate independent businesses while benefiting from shared facilities and support services.

The growth of franchise salon suite systems enabled expansion into hundreds of markets and attracted institutional and private-equity investment. In 2022, Audax Private Equity acquired Salon Lofts, one of the largest salon suite operators in the United States.

Industry observers have attributed the popularity of salon suites to increasing interest in entrepreneurship among beauty professionals, individual branding opportunities, and greater control over design, pricing and work scheduling.
