= Ottoman (furniture) =

Furniture

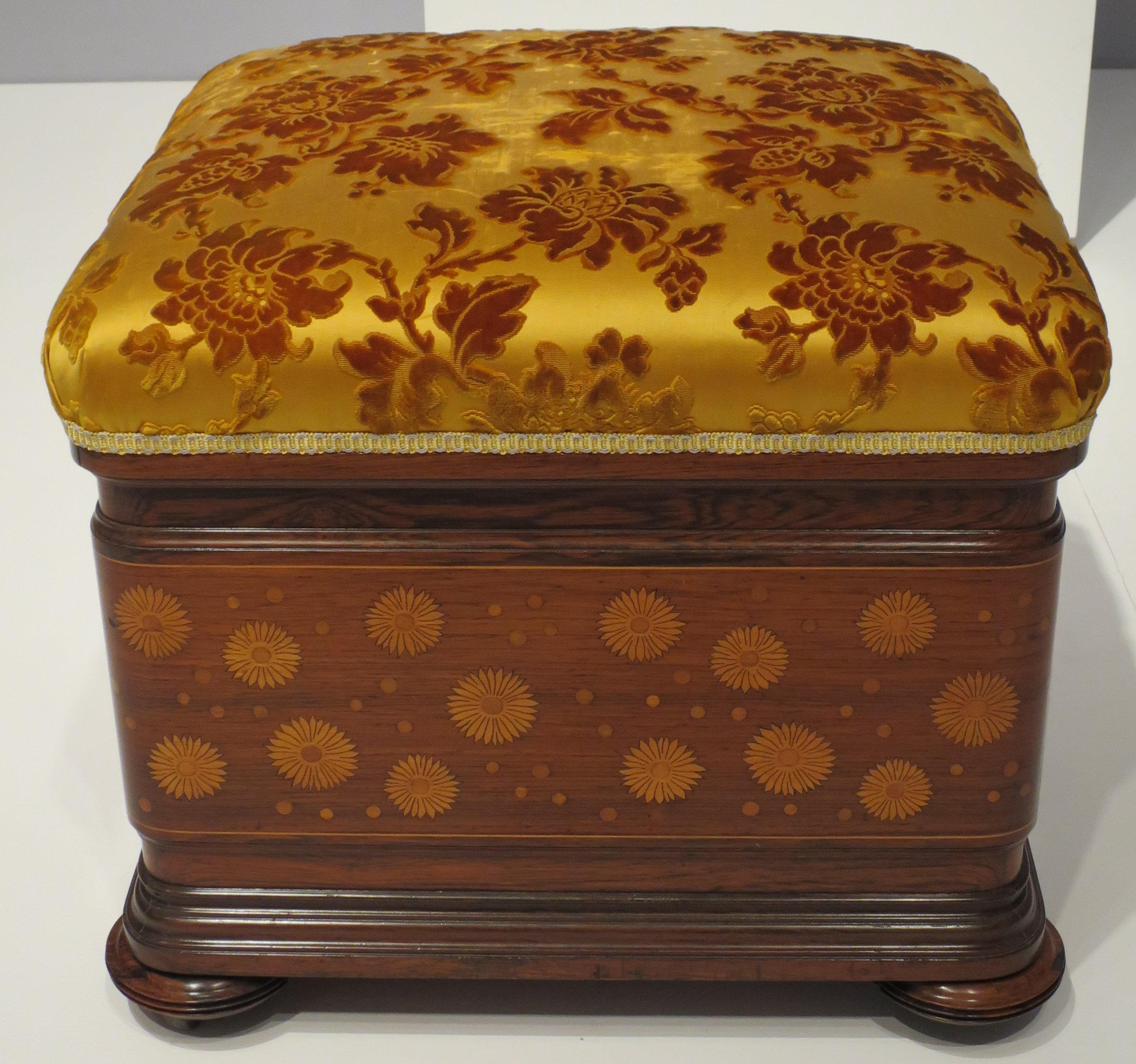
Herter Brothers Ottoman, 1881–1882, rosewood with marquetry of various woods, cedar and cut silk velvet

An ottoman is a piece of furniture. Generally, ottomans have neither backs nor arms. They may be an upholstered low couch or a smaller cushioned seat used as a table, stool or footstool. The seat may have hinges and a lid, allowing the space inside to be used for storing linen, magazines, or other items, making it a form of storage furniture. The smaller version is usually placed near to an armchair or sofa as part of living room decor, or may be used as a fireside seat.

Ottoman footstools are often sold as coordinating furniture with armchairs, sofas, or gliders. Other names for this piece of furniture include footstool, hassock, and pouf[fe].

== History ==
The ottoman traces its roots to furnishing practices in the Ottoman Empire in modern-day Turkey, where it was the central piece of residential seating, generally designed as a low wooden platform intended to be piled with cushions. It was first developed as sectional furniture that wrapped around three walls of a room, before evolving into smaller versions that fit into the corner of a room or circular padded seats surrounding a column or pole in a public room.

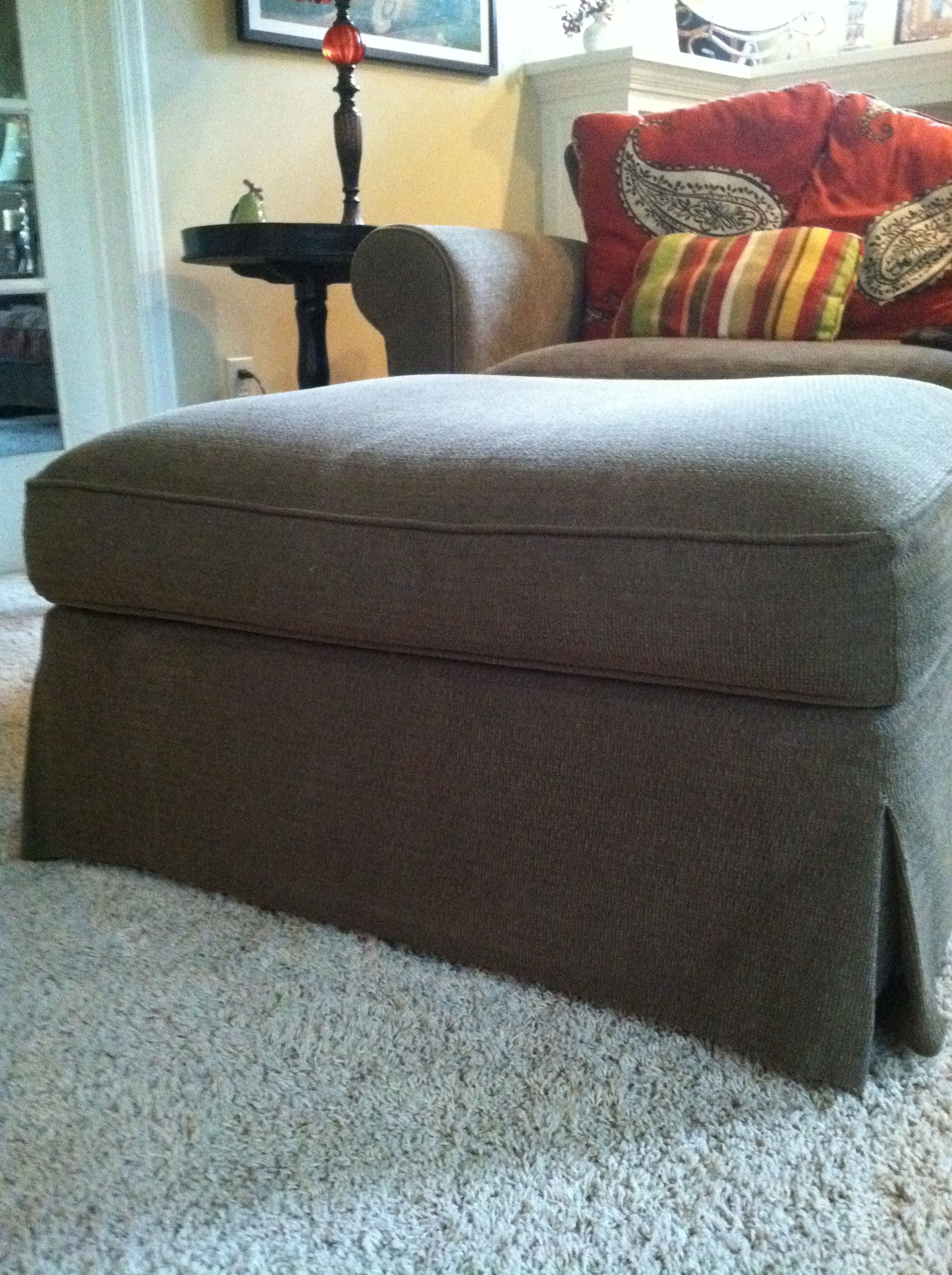
A modern ottoman in a living room

The ottoman was eventually brought to other parts of Europe from the Ottoman Empire in the late 18th century and named after its place of origin. The earliest known instance of the use of the name is ottomane in French in 1729. The first known recorded use in English occurs in one of Thomas Jefferson's memorandum books from 1789, "P[ai]d. for an Ottomane of velours d'Utrecht."

Over the subsequent generation, the ottoman became a common piece of bedroom furniture. European ottomans standardized on a smaller size than the traditional Turkish ottoman, and in the 19th century they took on a circular or octagonal shape. The seat was divided in the center by arms or by a central, padded column that might hold a plant or statue. Hinged seats also began to appear, so that the space inside the ottoman could be used to store items.

The ottoman footstool, a closely allied piece of furniture, was an upholstered footstool on four legs, which could also be used as a fireside seat, the seat covered with carpet, embroidery, or beadwork. By the 20th century, the word ottoman encompassed both forms.
