= Taboret =

Type of stool or cabinet

A taboret (also spelled tabouret or tabourette) refers to two different pieces of furniture: a cabinet or a stool.

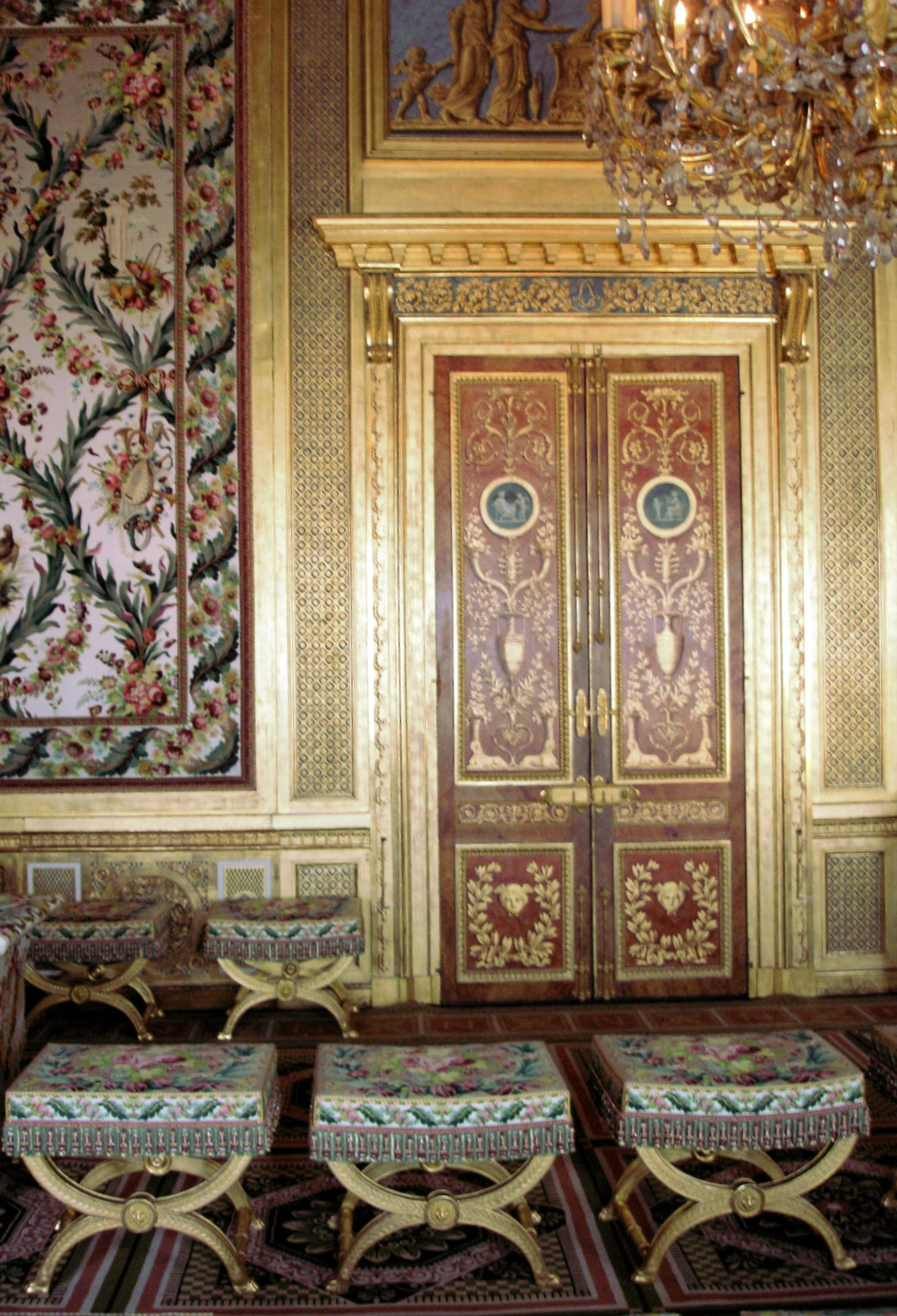
Empire style tabourets in the Château de Fontainebleau

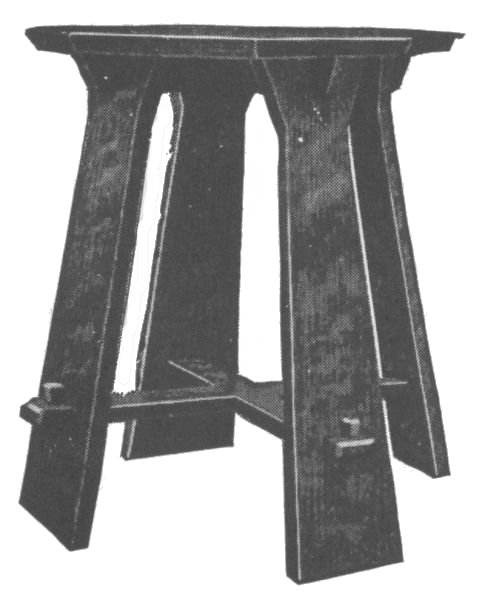
1909 octagonal tabouret of Arts and Crafts design

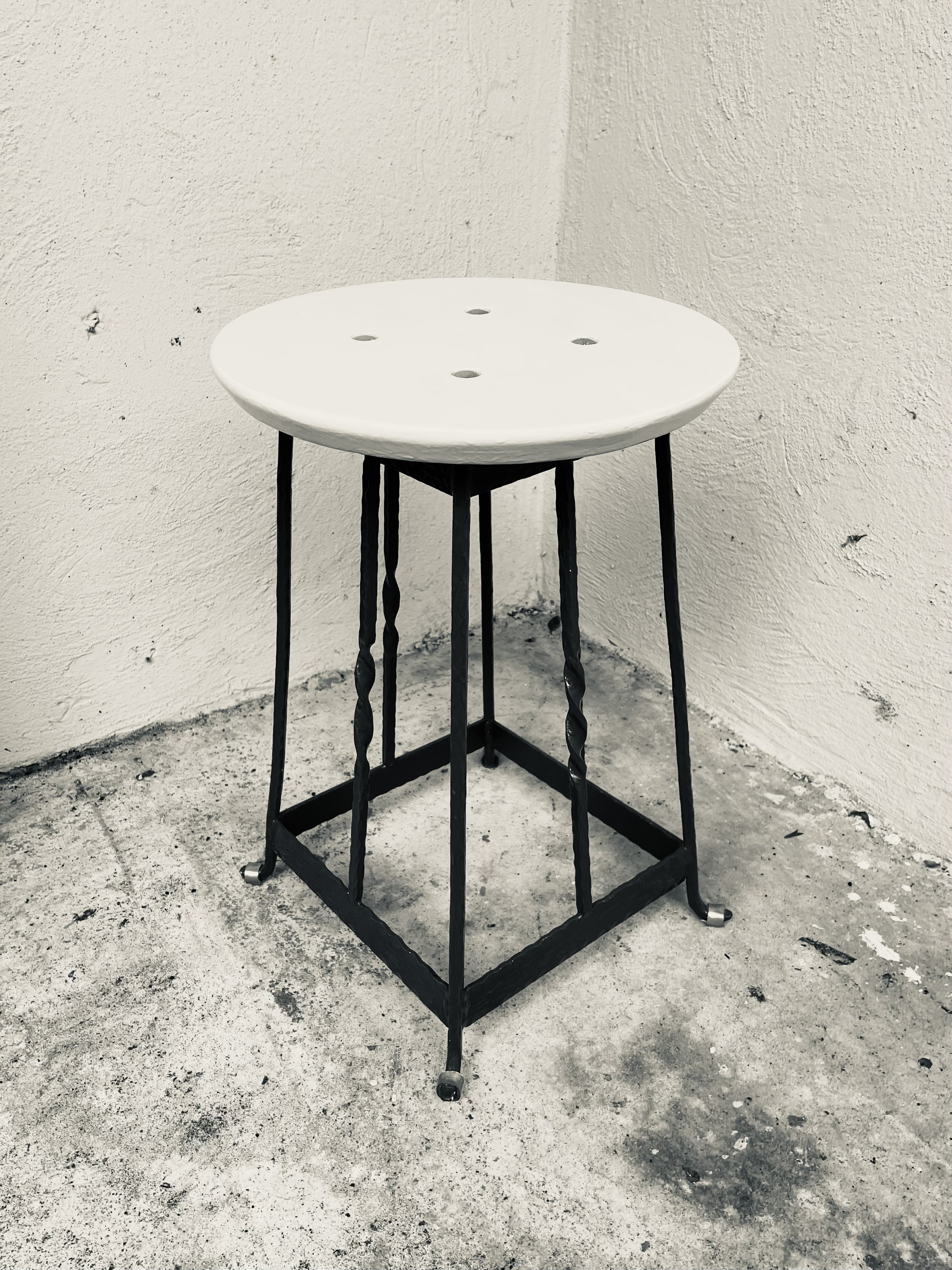
1910 Jacobean tabouret, UK

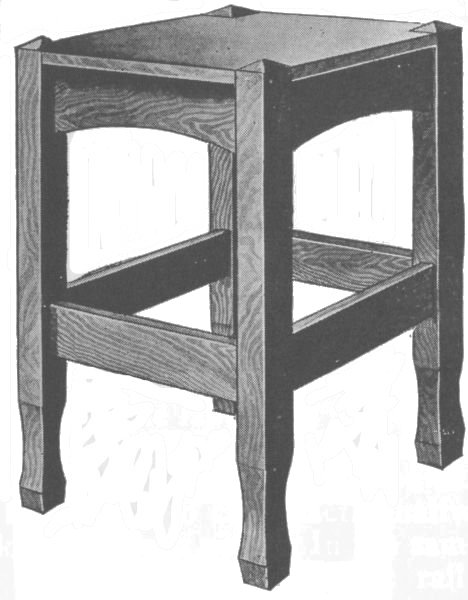
1912 square tabouret of craftsman design

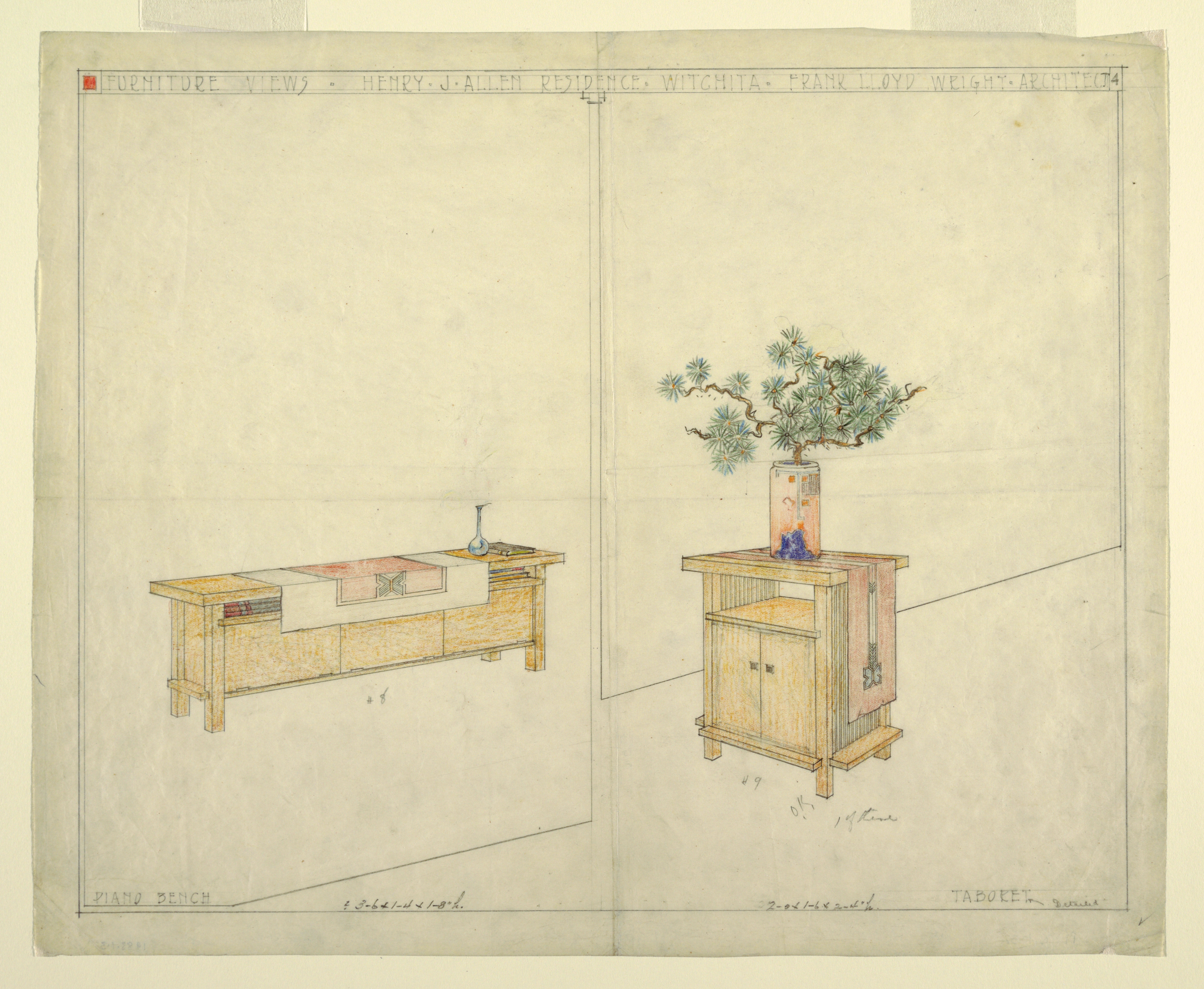
1917 piano bench and taboret

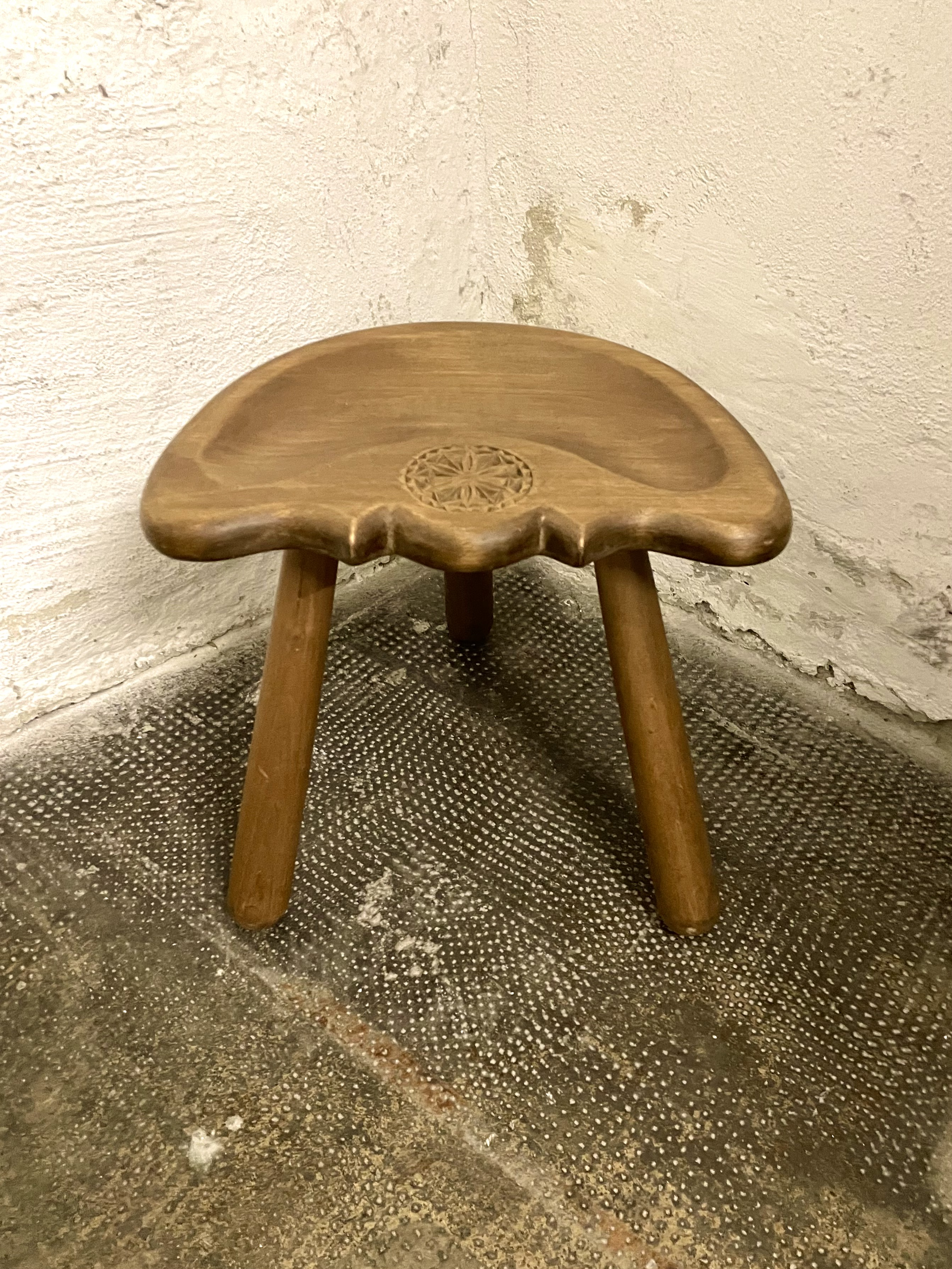
19th century milking tabouret, Romania

== 17th-century stool ==
As a stool, it refers to a short stool without a back or arms. The name is derived from its resemblance to a drum (diminutive of Old French tabour).

The tabouret acquired a more specialized meaning in 17th-century France at the court of Louis XIV in Versailles, where it allowed female courtiers to sit in the presence of the royal family. The court tabouret was an elaborate, upholstered stool with curved wooden legs and tassels, carried by a liveried and wigged servant. Duchesses were automatically granted the honor of sitting in front of the queen. This stool became such a symbol of privilege that when Louis XIV's mother, the Regent Anne of Austria, granted the tabouret to two non-duchesses, such a storm of protest was raised that she had to revoke the order.

== Arts and Crafts plant stand ==
In the context of the Arts and Crafts Movement, a taboret is a narrow and tall stand for a plant, lamp, ashtray, or a beverage. It may also be a mission oak book stand shelf, or side table, or end table.

== Modern cabinet ==
The current sense refers to graphic artists' task furniture, a wheeled, portable stand or cabinet, with drawers and shelves for storage, used to bring supplies to a work area.

== See also ==
- Stool (seat)
