= Bar stool =

Type of tall stool, often with a foot rest

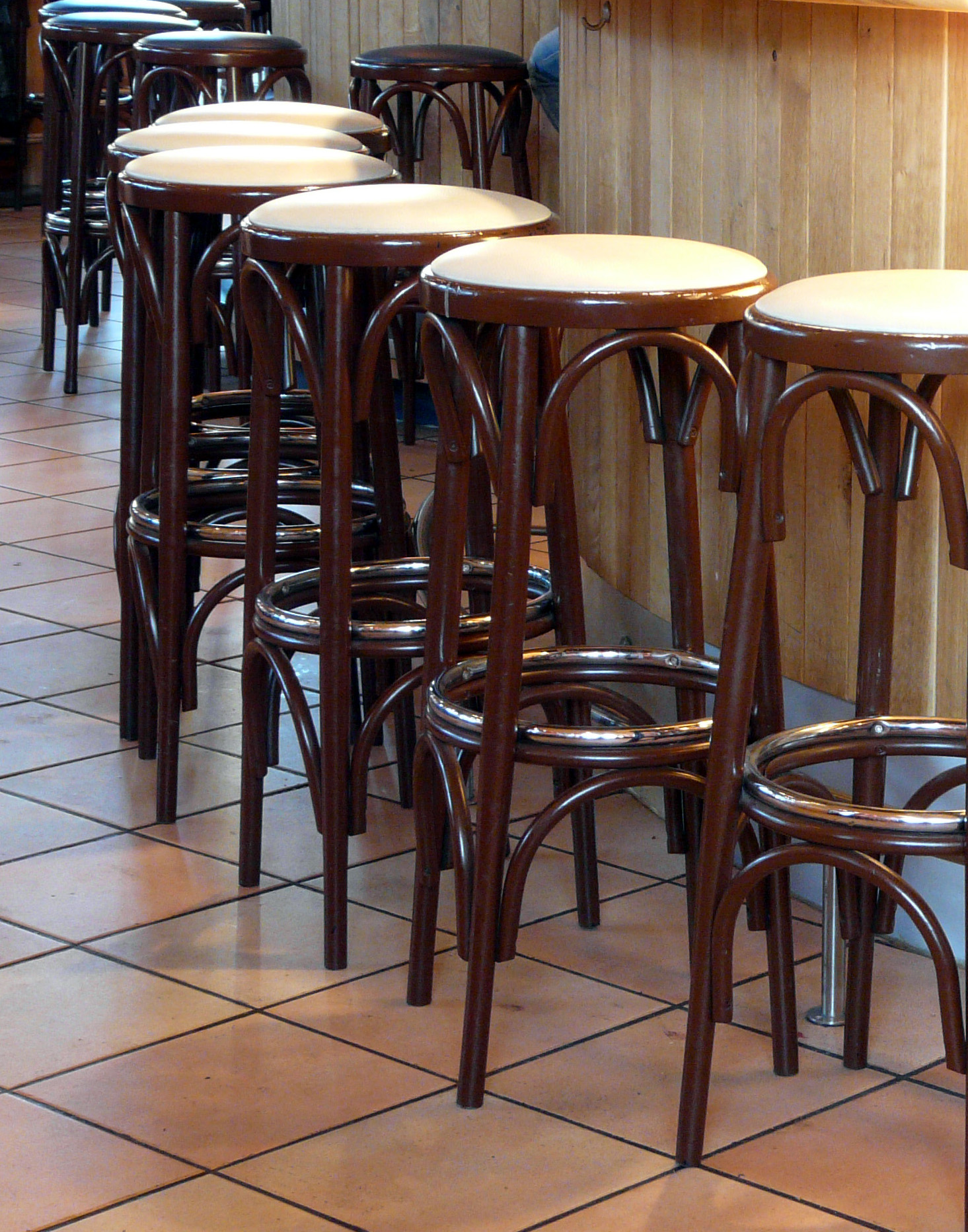
Wooden bar stools

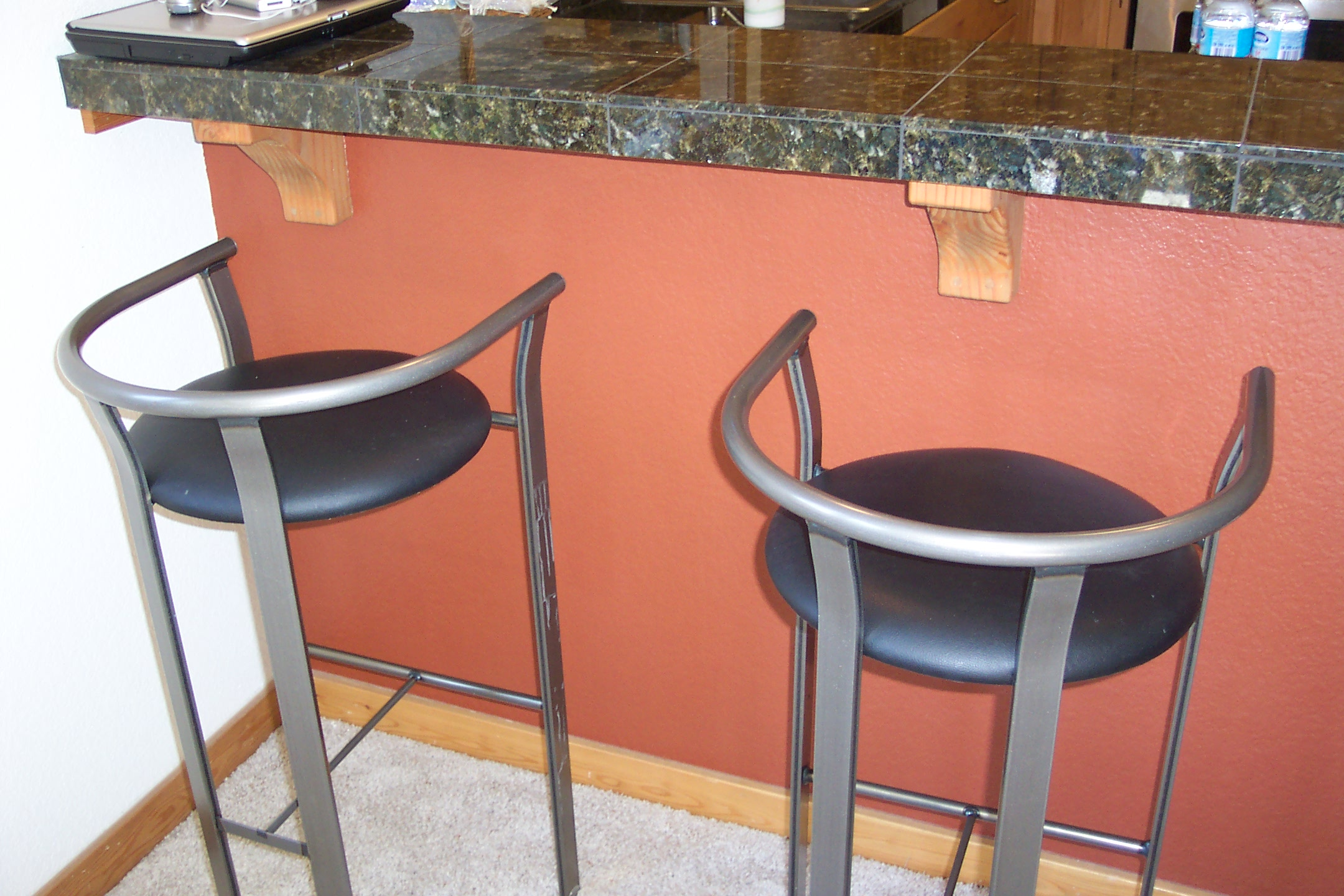
Modern bar stools in front of a kitchen counter

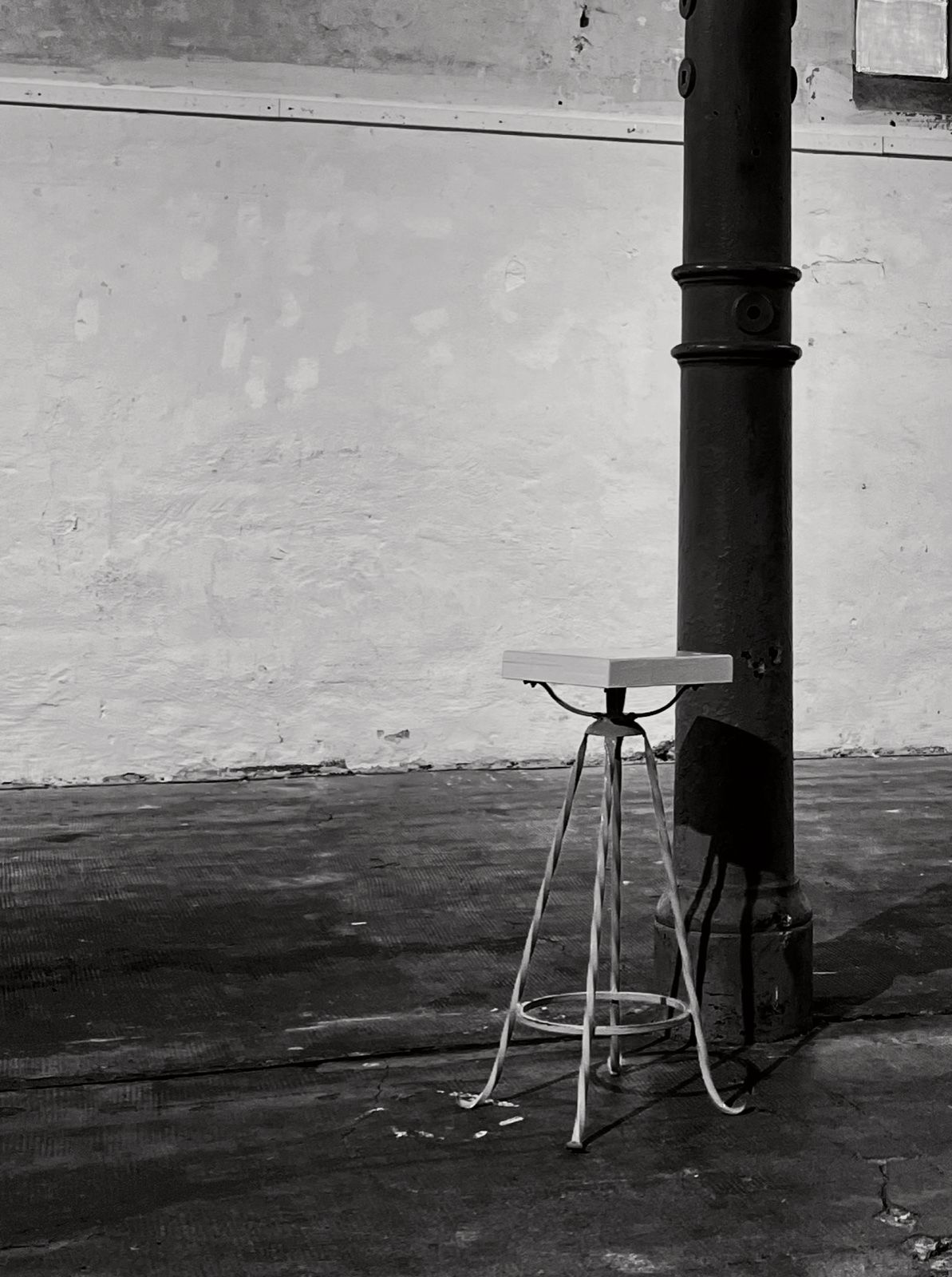
Bar stool "Eiffel Tower" from 1950, Paris/ France

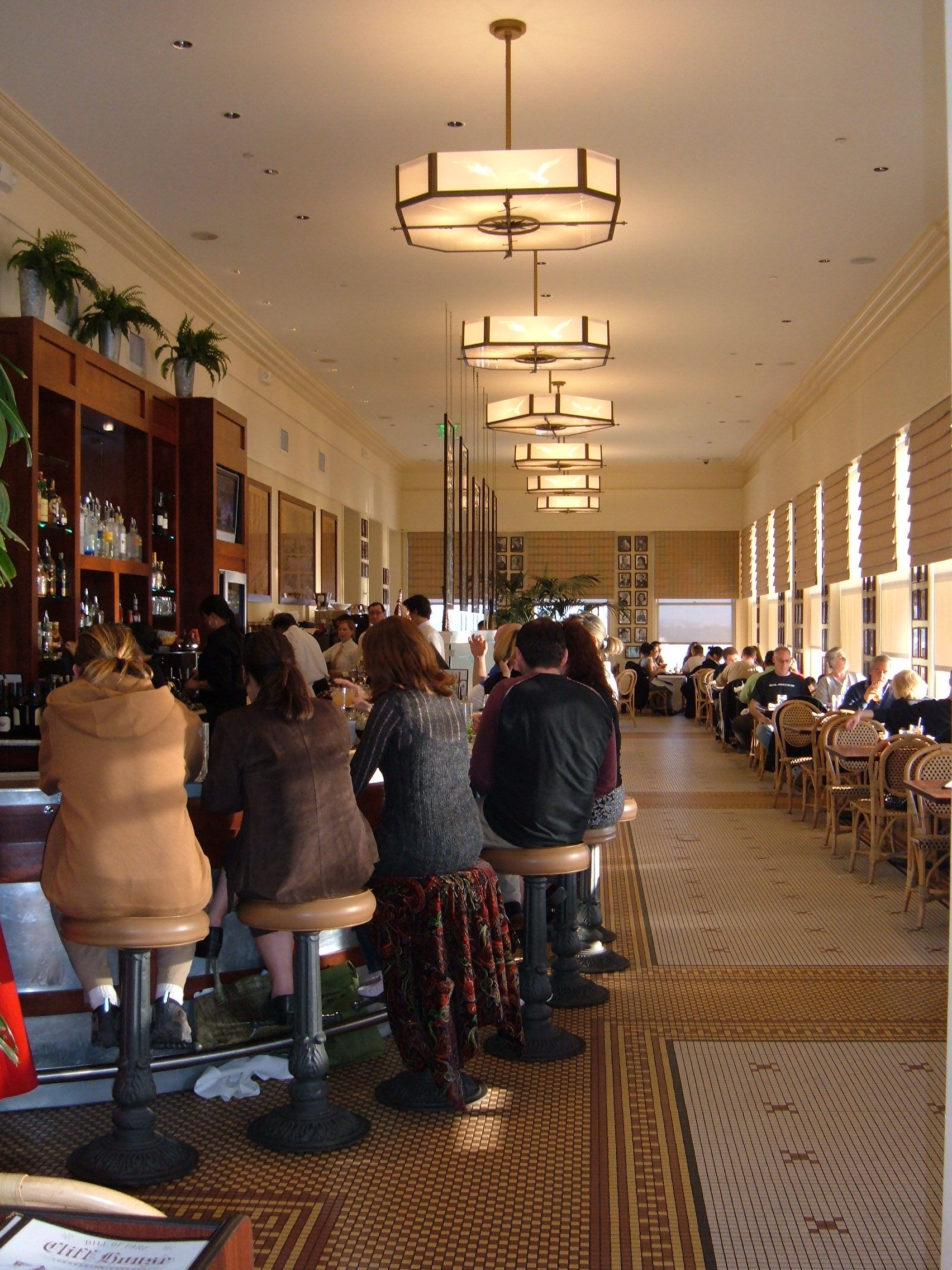
Floor mounted stools

Bar stools are a type of tall stool, often with a foot rest to support the feet. The height and narrowness of bar stools make them suitable for use at bars and high tables in pubs or bars.

Before Prohibition in the United States, bar stools were not used in drinking establishments, but in food establishments. Bars without stools were the norm, and that was considered "an American peculiarity".

There are many different types, construction materials and models. Bar stools are often made of wood or metal. There are bar stools with and without armrests, backs, and padding or upholstery on the seat surface. Bar stools can range from basic wooden designs to more complex ones with adjustable height. Extra tall and extra short are common features, as well as indoor bar stools and outdoor bar stools. Some bar stools have backs, while most do not. In commercial settings, swivel and floor mounted bar stools are common. Floor mounting renders the stool immovable, so it cannot be stolen or used as a weapon in a bar fight. Floor-mounted stools generally are mounted on a column, but stools with legs can also be secured to the floor using metal brackets.

The normal seat height for a bar stool is 30 in (76 cm) with a 26 in (66 cm) stool being used against kitchen counters. Extra tall 36 in (91 cm) stools are increasingly used in contemporary styles with high pub tables to create a visual effect in modern interiors. Counter height bar stools have a seat height of 24 in (61 cm). By comparison a conventional dining chair seat height is 18 in (46 cm). Some bar stools use polyurethane foam as padding for comfort. Bar stools can be made from rattan or bamboo and these stools can be used to create a tiki bar effect. The retro styling of the 1950s and 1960s is popular in some bars and restaurants, which use chrome and vinyl stools combined with matching benches or diner chairs. Stacking stools are often favored for their space-saving qualities. Some establishments use matching bar stools and chairs.

Aluminum is often used outdoors. Stacking aluminum stools and patio chairs are used by commercial premises. Indoors, wood and upholstery are popular in traditional settings. Bar stools are used in pool or billiard halls and the style of chair customized for such use is often called a "spectator chair". Bar stools are used in Ireland during weekends by followers of the English Premier League, a practice which led to the creation of the pejorative term "barstoolers" by supporters of the League of Ireland.

== See also ==
- Right to sit
