= Footstool =

Piece of furniture used to elevate the feet

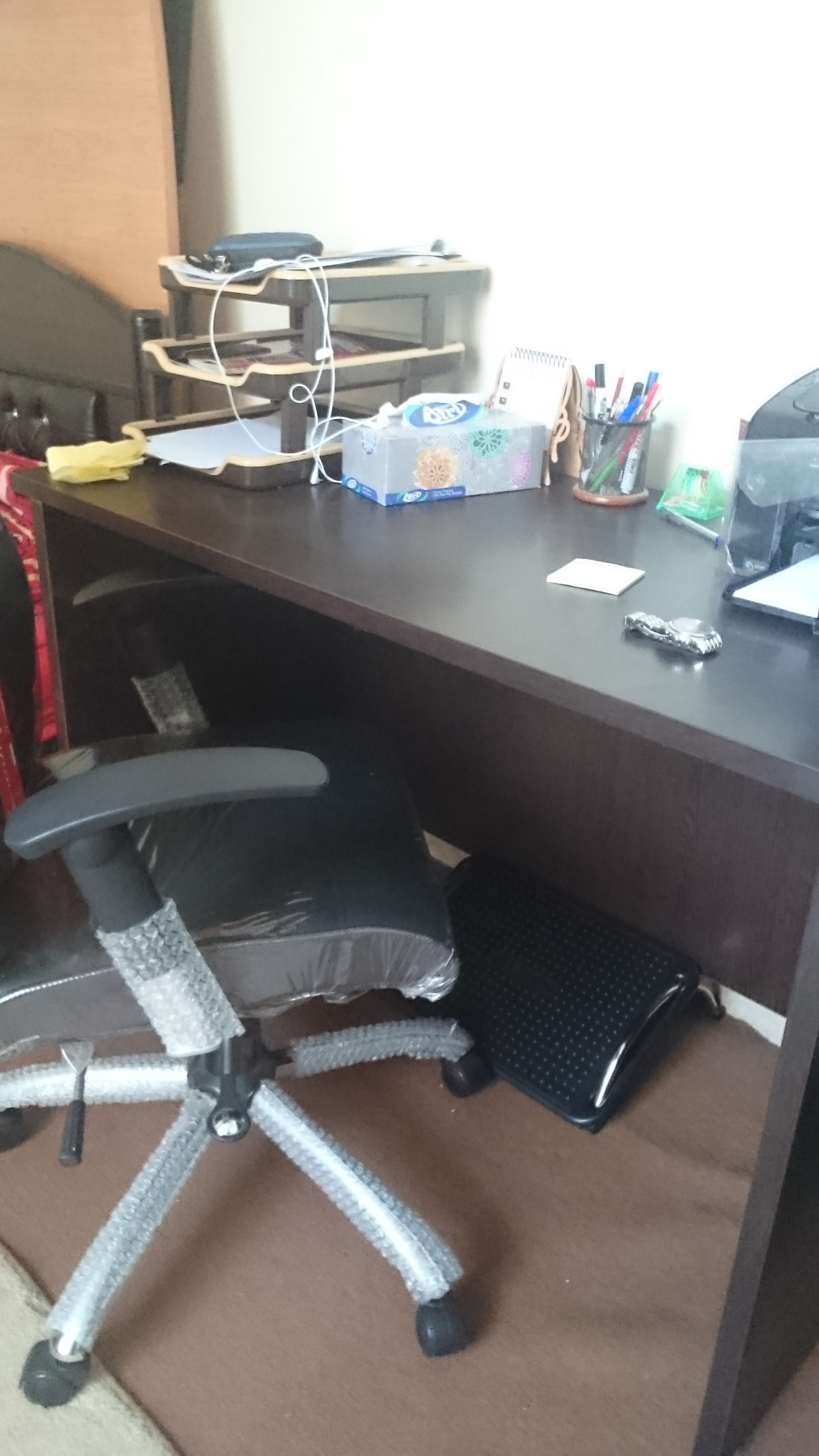
Editing footstool

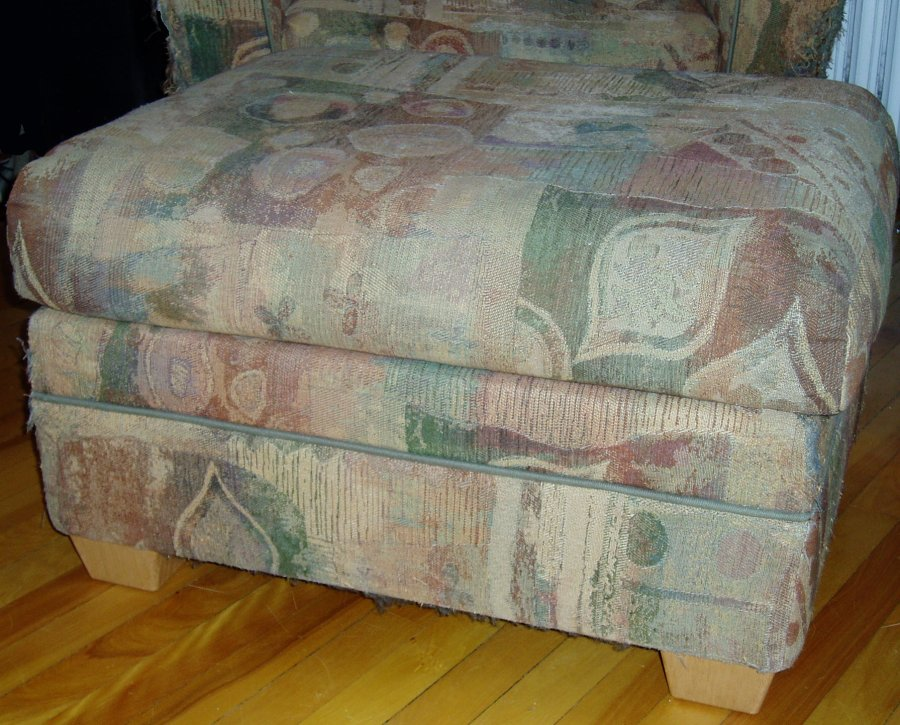
An Ottoman footstool

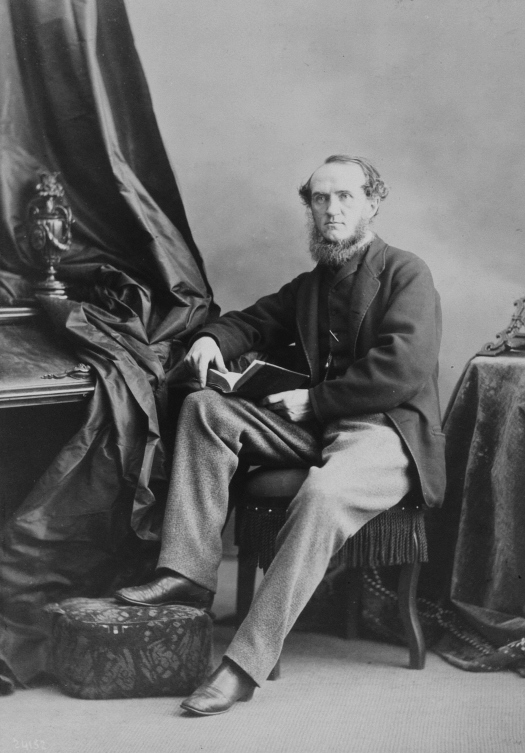
Self-portrait of William Notman (with one foot resting on a footstool)

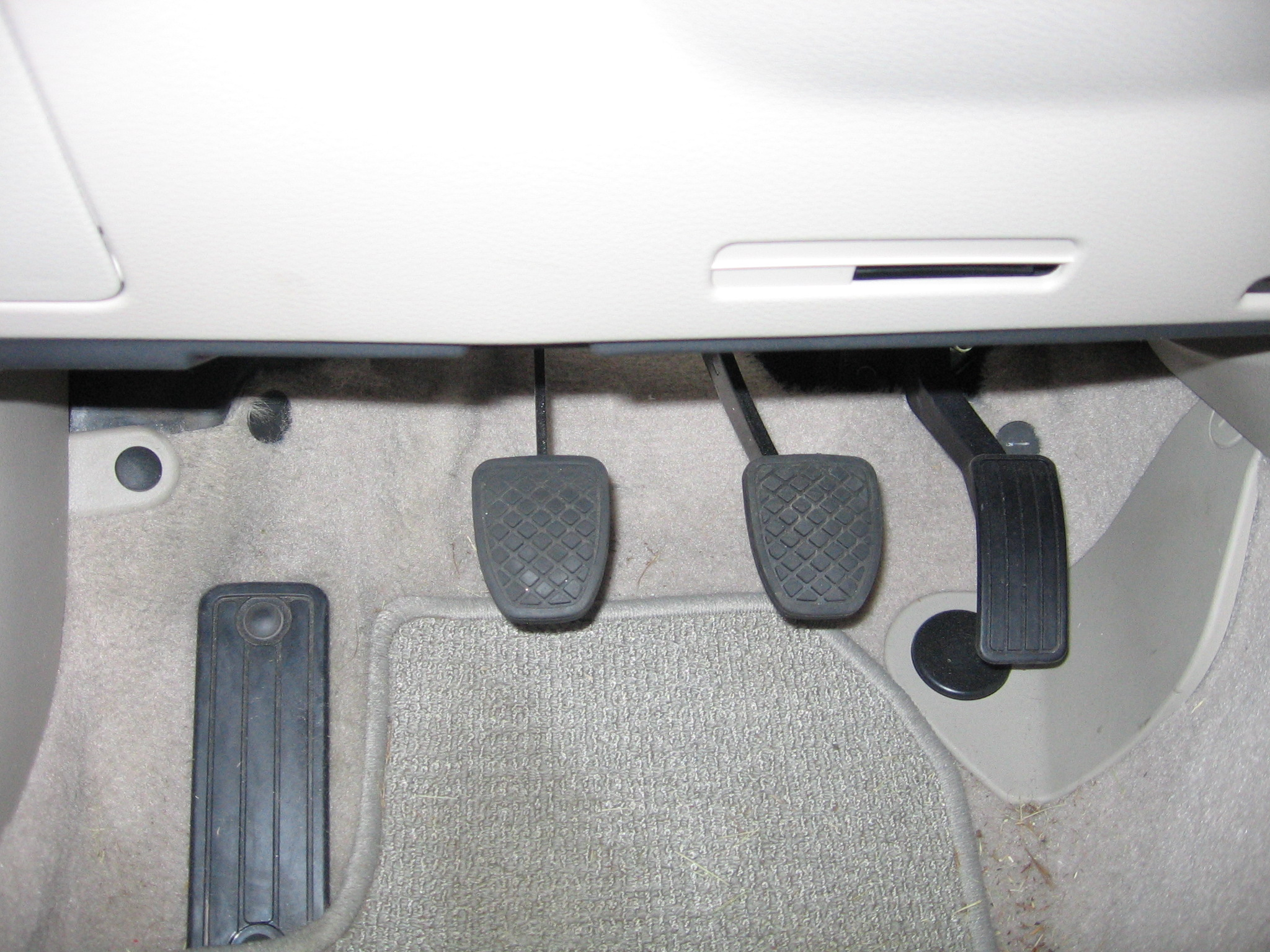
Automobile pedals in a Subaru Legacy. From left to right: foot rest, clutch, brake, accelerator.

A footstool (foot stool, footrest, foot rest) is a piece of furniture or a support used to elevate the feet. There are two main types of footstool, which can be loosely categorized into those designed for comfort and those designed for function.

== Comfort ==
This type of footstool is used to provide comfort to a person seated, for example, in a chair or sofa. It is typically a short, wide, four-legged stool. The top is upholstered and padded in a fabric or animal hide, such as leather. This type of footstool is also a type of ottoman. It allows the seated person to rest their feet upon it, supporting the legs at a mostly horizontal level, thus giving rise to the alternate term footrest. High quality footstools are height–adjustable.

== Function ==
This type of footstool supports a person's (usually a child's) feet that do not reach the floor when seated. The footstool is placed under the feet of a sitting person so that the person's feet may rest comfortably on it. An example is the type of piano footstool used in conjunction with a piano bench. It is also used to make the blood circulation of the body flow more freely when sitting down.

A barber chair and a shoeshiner have foot rests. An automobile typically has a "dummy pedal" that acts as a foot rest to discourage "riding the clutch" or "riding the brake". A foot peg is another type of foot rest usually on BMX bicycles, motorcycles, the Ford N-Series tractor, some kayaks, the Impossible wheel, and other transportation devices.

== History ==
Footstools have been known for many years, and have evolved throughout history. The footstool is attested in ancient Egypt, where it was utilized to ascend chairs perched high off the ground. It was also used to rest a person's feet when he or she was seated.

In the 18th century a low, long footstool called a fender stool was popular. It was placed in front of the fireplace, and long enough for all of the family members to place their feet and warm them up.

Footstools were generally interchangeable in everyday life from the 17th through the early 19th century. In early American homes the footstool was very valuable, and took precious space although the living quarters were cramped.

In line with this, the exhibition 'A History of the World' at Mevagissey Museum in Cornwall showed an emigrant's footstool which was made by an emigrant from Cornwall in North America sometime around 1850s.

== See also ==
- Ottoman (furniture)
- Tuffet
- Arm rest
- Head rest
- Step (footing)
