= Piano stool =

Stool used to play the piano

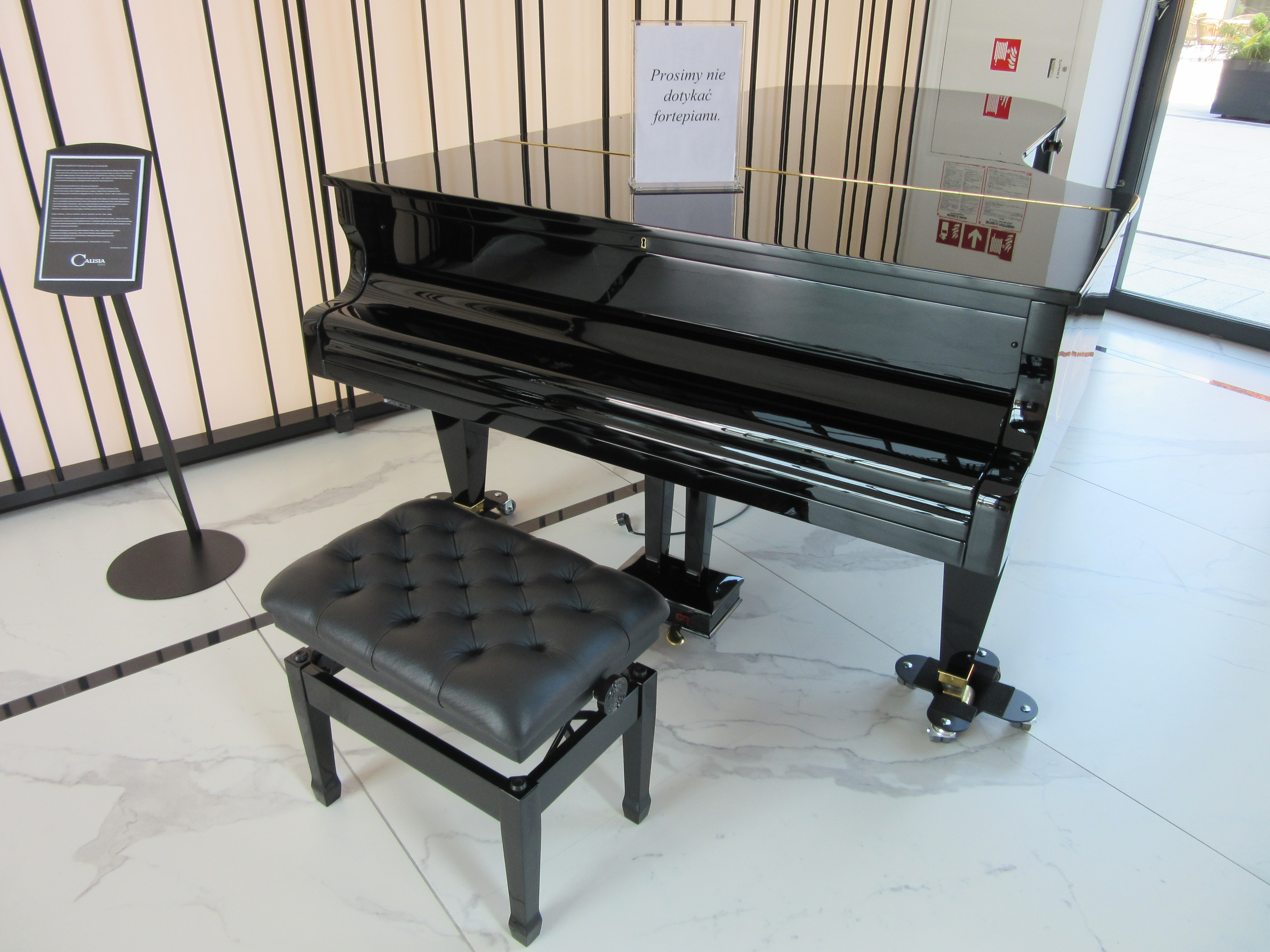
A grand piano with an adjustable piano stool. The piano notably has wheels.

A piano stool, also referred to as a piano bench or piano chair (depending on its style) is a seat especially designed for use at the piano, though it has been largely unchanged since its creation and has been demonstrated (in an isolated scientific experiment conducted by physical therapist scientists) to increase the acquisition of musculoskeletal disorders in pianists.

Its height is sometimes adjustable to accommodate players of various sizes. It is often padded, either with an integrated foam-filled cover or a purpose-made detachable cushion. In its bench form, it sometimes has a hidden compartment for storing music sheets and other supplies.

== Types ==
- A piano bench has a rectangular seat with back support and a 4-legged base. It is arguably the most common contemporary design as of the 2020s. A lifting mechanism under the seat allows it to be raised or lowered using turning knobs on the sides. Some piano benches instead feature a hydraulic system with a height-adjustment lever mounted under the seat, similar to some office chairs.
- A Beethoven piano chair (named after Ludwig van Beethoven), or simply a piano chair, is a height-adjustable chair (i.e. with back support). Such chairs often have a release lever on the back which allows the seat to be raised or lowered; when the lever is then released, it locks the chair in place. Such chairs are more common in Asian and European countries, but are occasionally seen in the West.
- A screw stool has a round seat attached to the legs via a screw mechanism, such that the seat can be raised or lowered by turning it. Although very common during the 19th century and the first half of the 20th, they are now relatively rare, as the screw mechanism is prone to wobble.

== Other functions ==
- Many piano stools have a seat covered with fabric or artificial leather, which in turn is lightly padded with a springy material such as foam, cotton wool or the like. The upholstery can provide better sitting comfort compared to a hard wooden seats which were common as piano chairs until the 1990s.
- Some piano benches are extra wide (duet piano stool) for allowing playing of works written for piano four hands.
- Some piano benches also have the opportunity to tilt the seat forward for a more ergonomic position.
- Piano benches come in many colors and styles. In concert settings the chair often matches the color of the instrument.
- Some piano chairs have a slightly curved surface so that the pianist sits in a "pit". This promotes stability while playing, but has the drawback that the pianists hips can't move as easily from side to side.
- A good piano chair is built and designed such that it is wide and stable, and should not wiggle or slide while playing. It should also not squeak or make other sounds while the pianist is playing and moves their body.

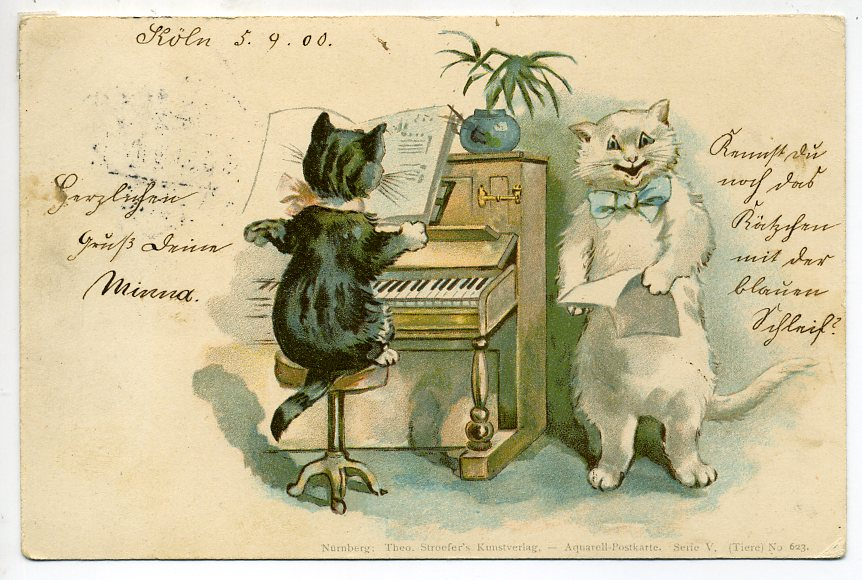
Drawing of a cat on a turnable stool

== Optimal height and ergonomics ==
To avoid wear, the pianist should have an appropriate posture while playing. This may involve having a straight back, relaxed shoulders, elbows slightly higher than the piano keys, feet on the floor, and ideally the pedals within reach.

The most important factor for the height of a piano bench is that the hands end up in a comfortable height for playing. However, if one is to play a piece where the pedals are used much, some pianists may have to compromise between a good height for their hands while at the same time being able to reach the pedals.

In case one sits too low, the pianist may have to compensate by lifting the elbows and shoulders, which induces strain and can lead to developing repetitive strain injury. According to one source, many non-height-adjustable stools are too low for many pianists. A method to try out different heights may be to increase the height by placing books on the seat, or other stable materials, while using a pillow is discouraged by some piano teachers since they will result in an unstable platform to play from. A footstool may also be used to improve the blood circulation in the legs, and there are also piano pedal extenders available in the market to allow shorter players who will use the pedals a lot to connect to existing floor-mounted pedals.

In case one sits too high, the pianist can end up curving their back to compensate.

Typical dimensions of a piano chair can for example be in the order of 48 cm seating height, and with between 53 cm and 64 cm seat width, while a typical grand piano chair can be a little larger with seating heights between 46 and 61 cm, and seat widths around 90 cm.

Some tips for having good ergonomy while playing can be to sit with a straight upper body, have relaxed wrists, bent fingers, to move the whole body while playing, and to sit towards the front of the seat.
