= Barber chair =

Chair for customers of a barber

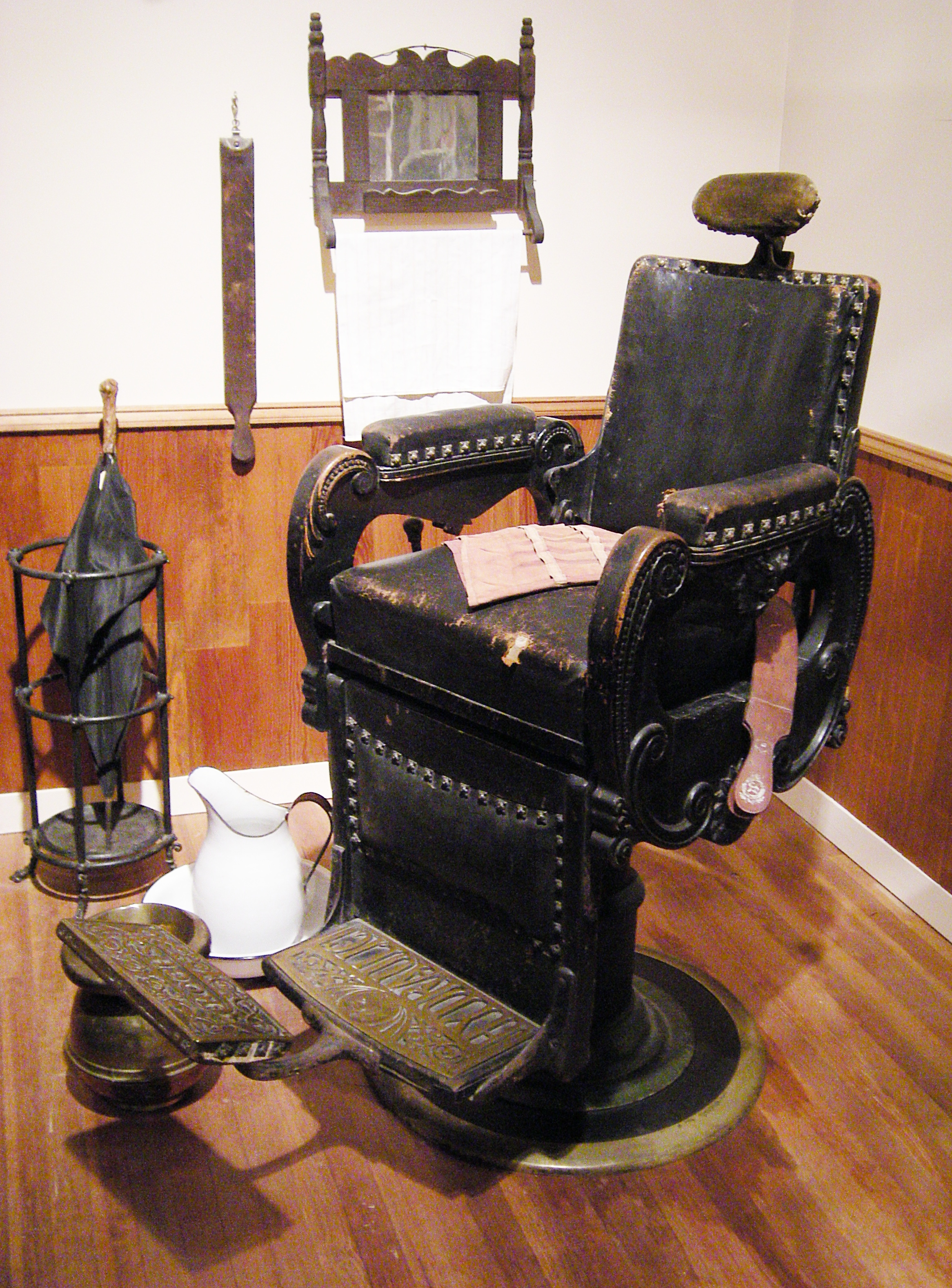
A barber chair in a recreation of J. N. Hooper's Barber Shop (Seattle, WA circa 1880s) at the Museum of History and Industry

A barber armchair is a specialized chair for the customers of a barbershop. It allows the barber to manipulate the position of a customer for ease of cutting or otherwise treating hair.

== Structure ==
The chairs usually have adjustable height (with a foot-operated jack or a hand-operated lever on the side). It can also rotate, or lean backwards (for hairwashing and shaving). In some states a head rest is required by law with the barber chair for shaving. They are normally made from metal and leather and are usually rather heavy. On the low end for cheaper barber chairs, the cost can be around $500, whereas higher-end barber chairs with more advanced features like adjustable headrests and leg rests, reclining capabilities and more sturdy building materials typically cost up to $2500.

== History ==
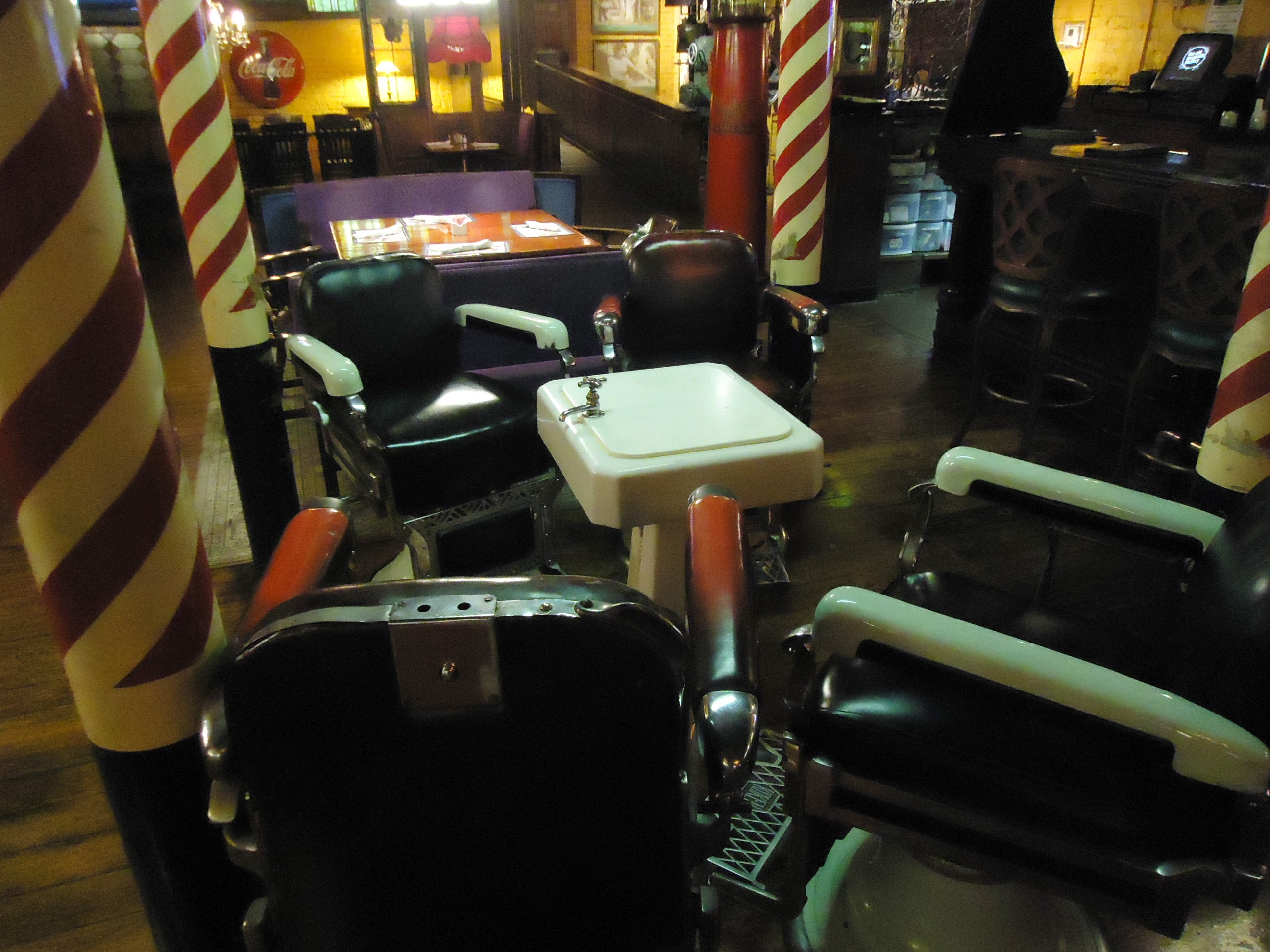
In 2015, barber chairs being used as decoration in a restaurant in Phoenix.

Barber chairs in engravings from the Civil War era share many features with modern chairs, including high seating, upholstery, and a footrest. The first factory-manufactured chairs date to around 1850. The first one-piece reclining barber chair with an attached footrest was patented in 1878 by the Archer Company of Saint Louis. Archer quickly followed it with a chair that raised and lowered mechanically. Eugene Berninghaus of Cincinnati improved on Archer's design with the first reclining and revolving chair, the Paragon. Theodore Koch of Chicago incorporated all of these innovations into his chairs, selling more than 35,000 chairs in the period before 1885.

In 1897, Samuel Kline (of the Kline Chair Company) patented a chair and filed a patent infringement lawsuit against Theodore Koch in 1905 (but was overturned). In 1904, Kline filed a patent for an "adjustable chair" which was granted in 1907.

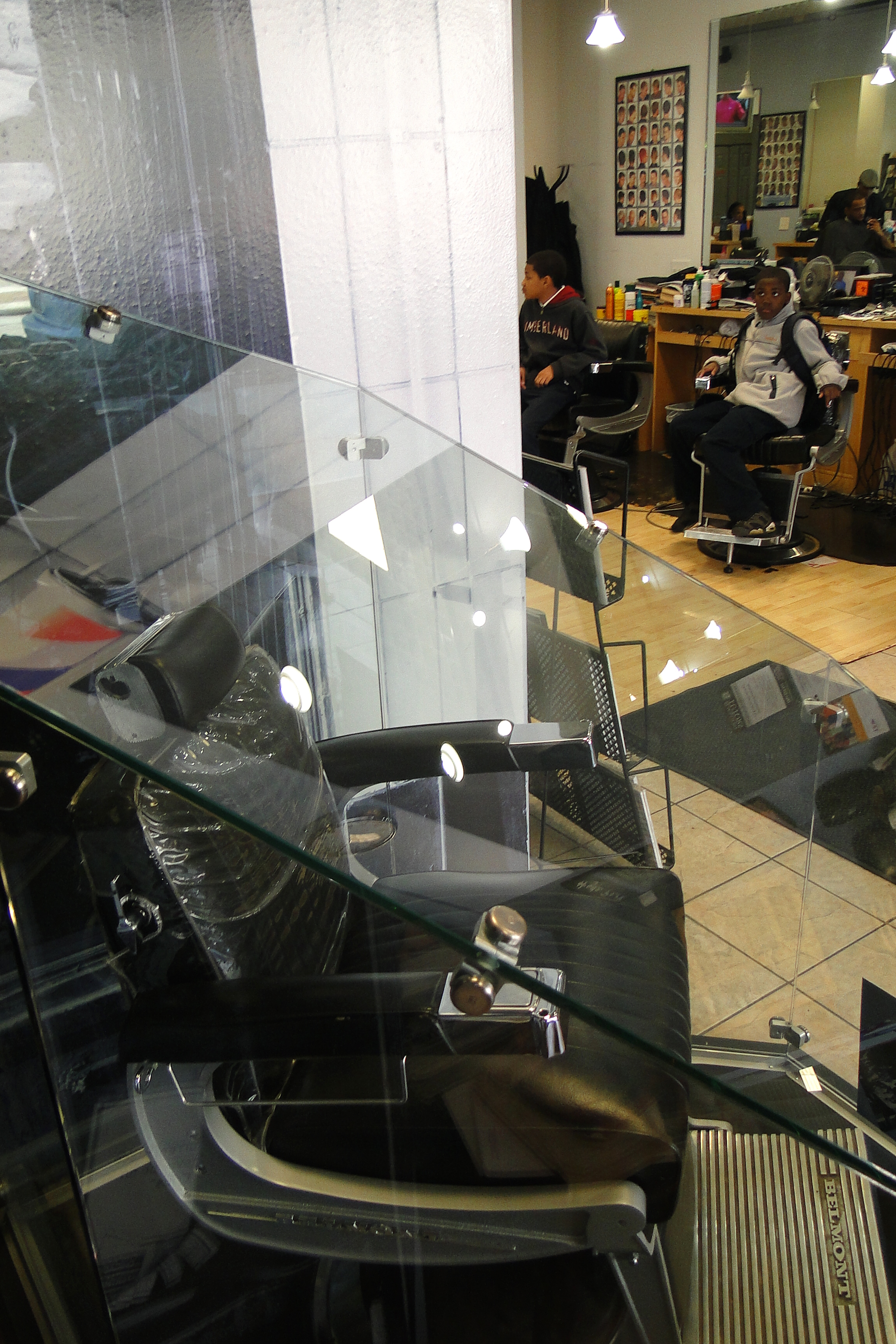
Barack Obama's bulletproof glass-encased barber chair at Hyde Park Hair Salon in Chicago

In 1900, Ernest Koken, a German immigrant, created a hydraulic-operated chair and also patented the "joystick" side lever, which allowed a barber to control all the mechanical functions.

In the late 1950s, US-based barber chair manufacturers sold about 10,000 chairs a year to the 100,000 barber shops. Chicago-based Emil J. Paidar Company was a leading manufacturer of barber chairs in the late 1950s (Belmont and American Barber Chair Company from 1948 to 1956 whose chairs were spinoffs of the Koken chair). Starting in 1957, Belmont joined Osaka, Japan's Takara Belmont Company began importing almost exact duplicates of Paidar chairs—at 20%-30% less cost. In June 1969 Takara purchased the Koken Barber Chair building and production equipment in St. Louis Mo and in 1970 they purchased the Koken name, trademarks and patents this purchase was the main reason that by 1970, Takara had 70% of the US market, beating out Paidar who once held the same amount.

== Single-chair barbershops ==
One-chair or single-chair barbershops are small, usually independent, barbershops that have only one barber chair available to customers. This is an older tradition in the barbering business that is slowly fading out as the last generation of barbers begins to retire and few younger barbers step up to fill the roles. One-chair barbershops serve one customer at a time and provide a one-on-one barber experience, whereas multi-chair barbershops serve many clients at once and get clients in and out faster, so they can make more money by serving more clients concurrently. Some salons have also incorporated the single-chair barbershop model into their businesses.

== See also ==
- Bárány chair
- Swivel chair
