= Stool (seat) =

Seating furniture without backrest and armrest

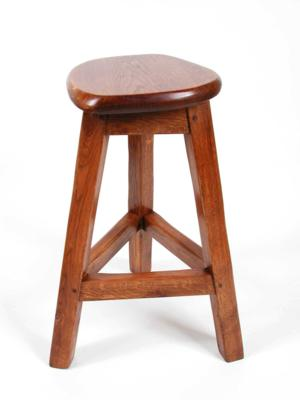
Three-legged joined stool

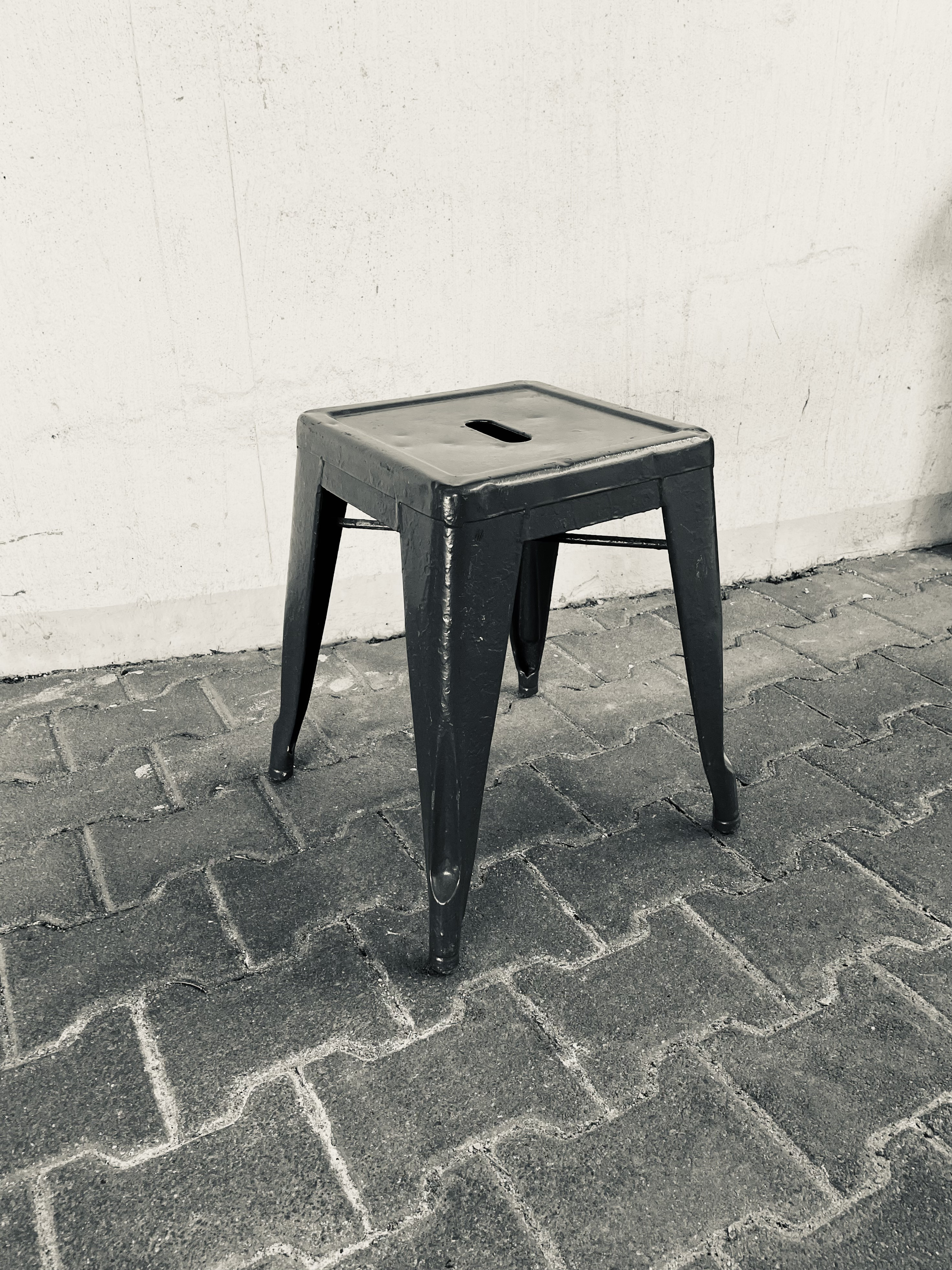
Tolix stool, 1945, France

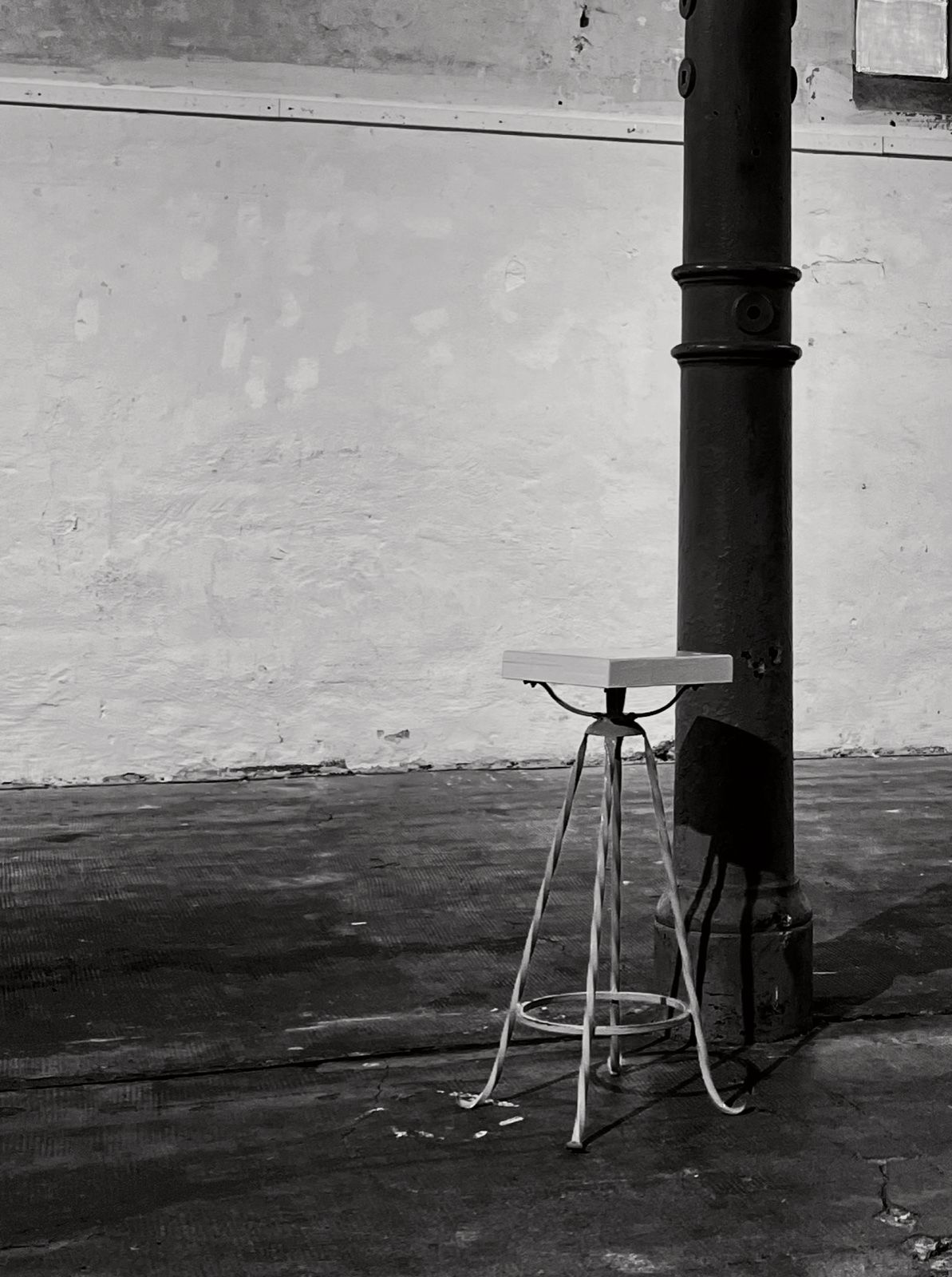
Bar stool "Eiffel Tower" from 1950, Paris/ France

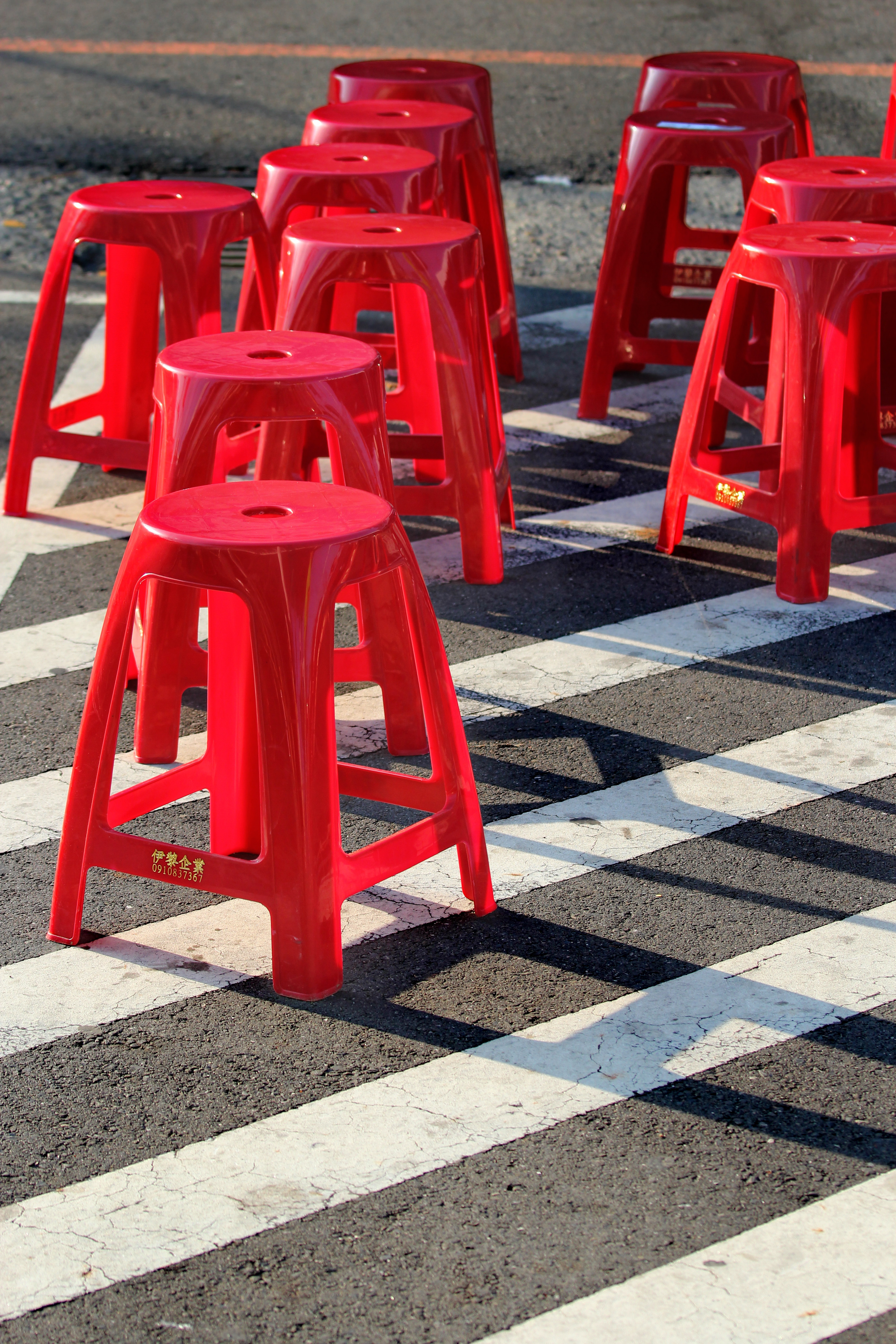
Molded plastic stools

A stool is a raised seat commonly supported by three or four legs, but with neither armrests nor a backrest. Stools are usually wooden (in early stools), and typically built to accommodate one occupant. As some of the earliest forms of seat, stools are sometimes called backless chairs despite how some modern stools have backrests. Folding stools can be collapsed into a flat, compact form typically by rotating the seat in parallel with fold-up legs.

== History ==
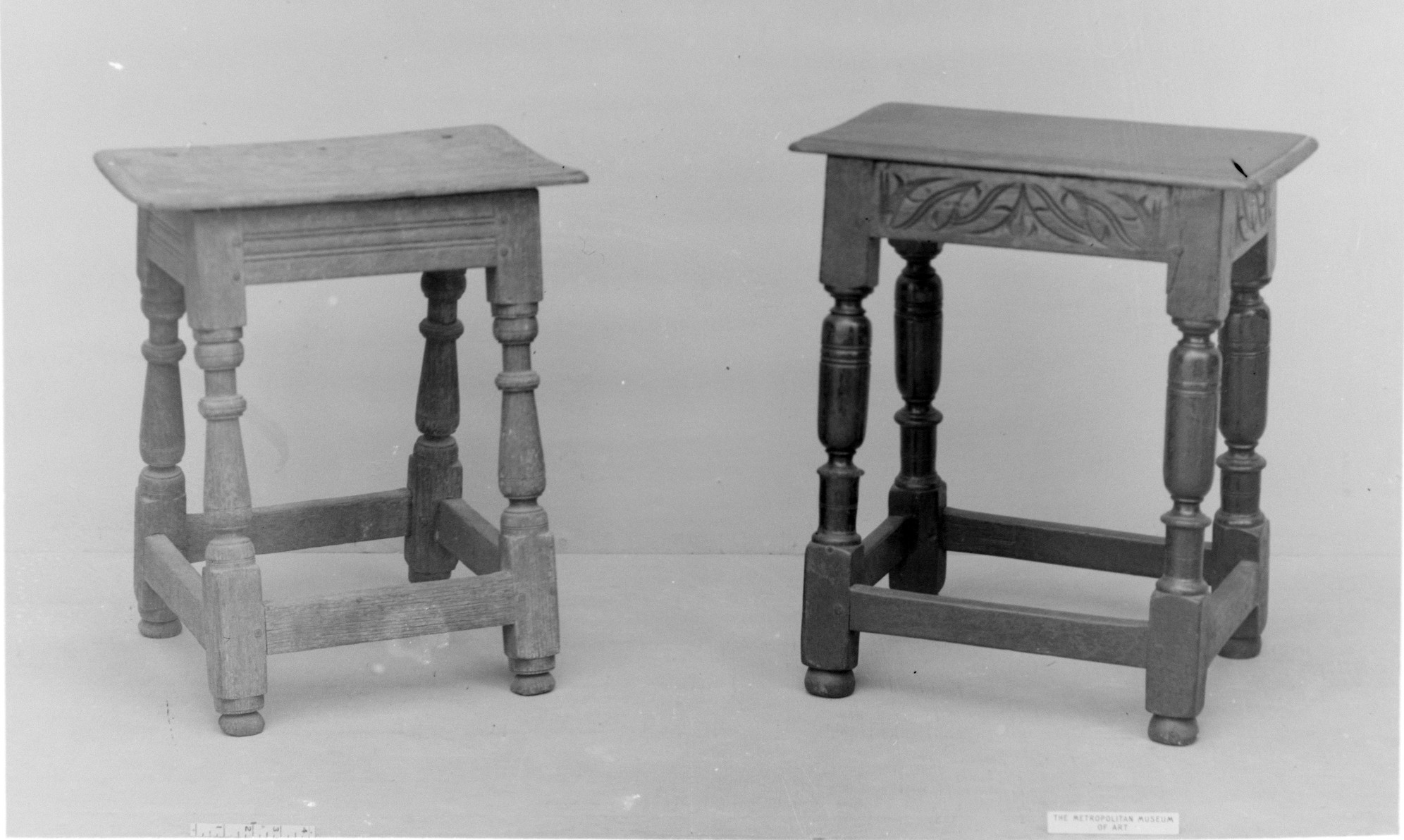
Typical English oak joint stools, 17th century

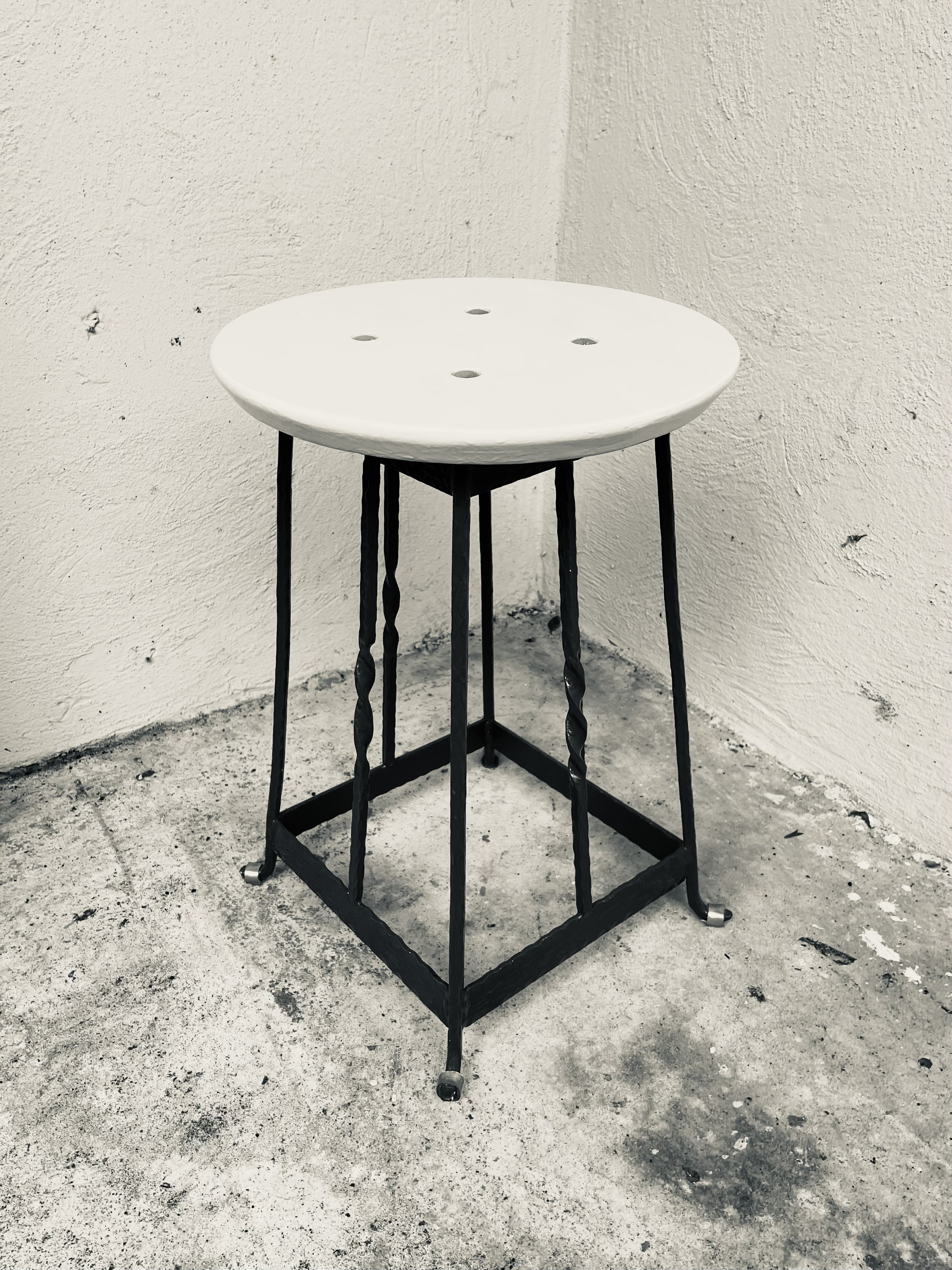
1910 Jacobean Stool, UK

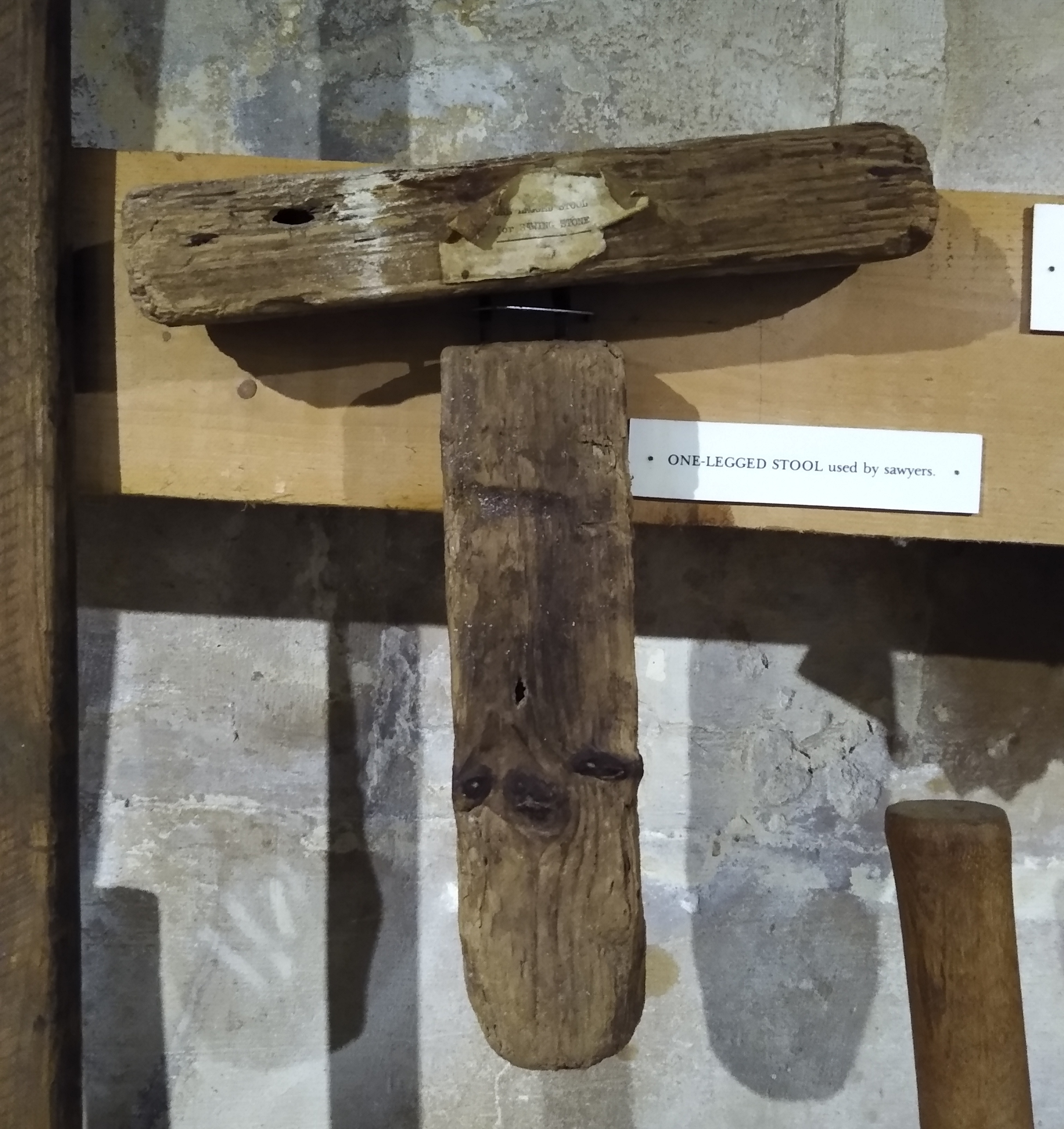
A one-legged stool used for sawing stone

The origins of stools are obscure, but they are known to be one of the earliest forms of wooden furniture. The ancient Egyptians used stools as seats, and later as footstools. The diphros was a four-leg stool in Ancient Greece, produced in both fixed and folding versions. Percy Macquoid claims that the turned stool was introduced from Byzantium by the Varangian Guard, and thus through Norse culture into Europe, reaching England via the Normans.

In the medieval period, seating consisted of benches, stools, and the very rare examples of throne-like chairs as an indication of status. The stools had two forms: the boarded or Gothic stool, a short bench with two board-like feet at the ends and also the simple turned stool. Turned stools were the progenitor of both the turned chair and the Windsor chair. The simplest stool was like the Windsor chair: a solid plank seat had three legs set into it with round mortice and tenon joints. These simple stools probably used the green woodworking technique of setting already-dried legs into a still-green seat. As the seat dries and shrinks, the joints are held tight. These legs were originally formed by shaving down from a simple branch or pole, later examples developed turned shapes.

Older Scottish texts may refer to a low stool as a "creepie" or as a "creepie-stool".

Three-legged stools are extant from the 17th century, as is an illustration of an early turned stool of this period. One of the uses for three-legged stools is for farm workers engaged in milking cows.

Later developments in the 17th century produced the joined stool, using the developing techniques of joinery to produce a larger box-like stool from the minimum of timber, by joining long thin spindles and rails together at right angles.

== Royal stools ==
Several kingdoms and chiefdoms in Africa had and still have traditions of using stools in the place of chairs as thrones. One of the most famous of them, the Golden Stool of the Asantehene in Ghana, was the cause of one of the most famous events in the history of colonized Africa, the so-called War of the Golden Stool between the British and the Ashanti.

== Backstools ==
The backstool represents an intermediate step between the development of the stool and the chair. A simple three-legged turned stool would have its rear leg extended outwards and a crossways pad attached. Backstools were always three-legged, with a central rear leg.

Turned backstools led in turn to the development of the three-legged turned chair, where the backrest was widened and supported by diagonal spindles leading down to extensions of the front legs. In time these diagonal supports became larger, higher and more level, leading to the turned armchair design.

=== Modern backstools ===
In modern times, the term "stool" has become blurred, and many types now have backs.

These are particularly common among bar stools, tall stools for seating at a counter, often fixed in place. These are a development of the chair as much as the stool, made more compact to allow dense seating around a serving table or counter. They may even be referred to as "backless chairs". One type of stool, Windsor-back stools, which "are popular in traditional homes", has a back.

Such backstools developed from around 1900, with the advent of modern materials such as bentwood and later the bent steel tube of Marcel Breuer's work at the Bauhaus. These isotropic materials no longer depended on the shapes of traditional joinery, as developed for earlier stools, and so strong backs could be attached arbitrarily, without relying on particular leg placements for strength.

== Variations ==
- folding step stool
- kick stool or kick step stool

== Gallery ==
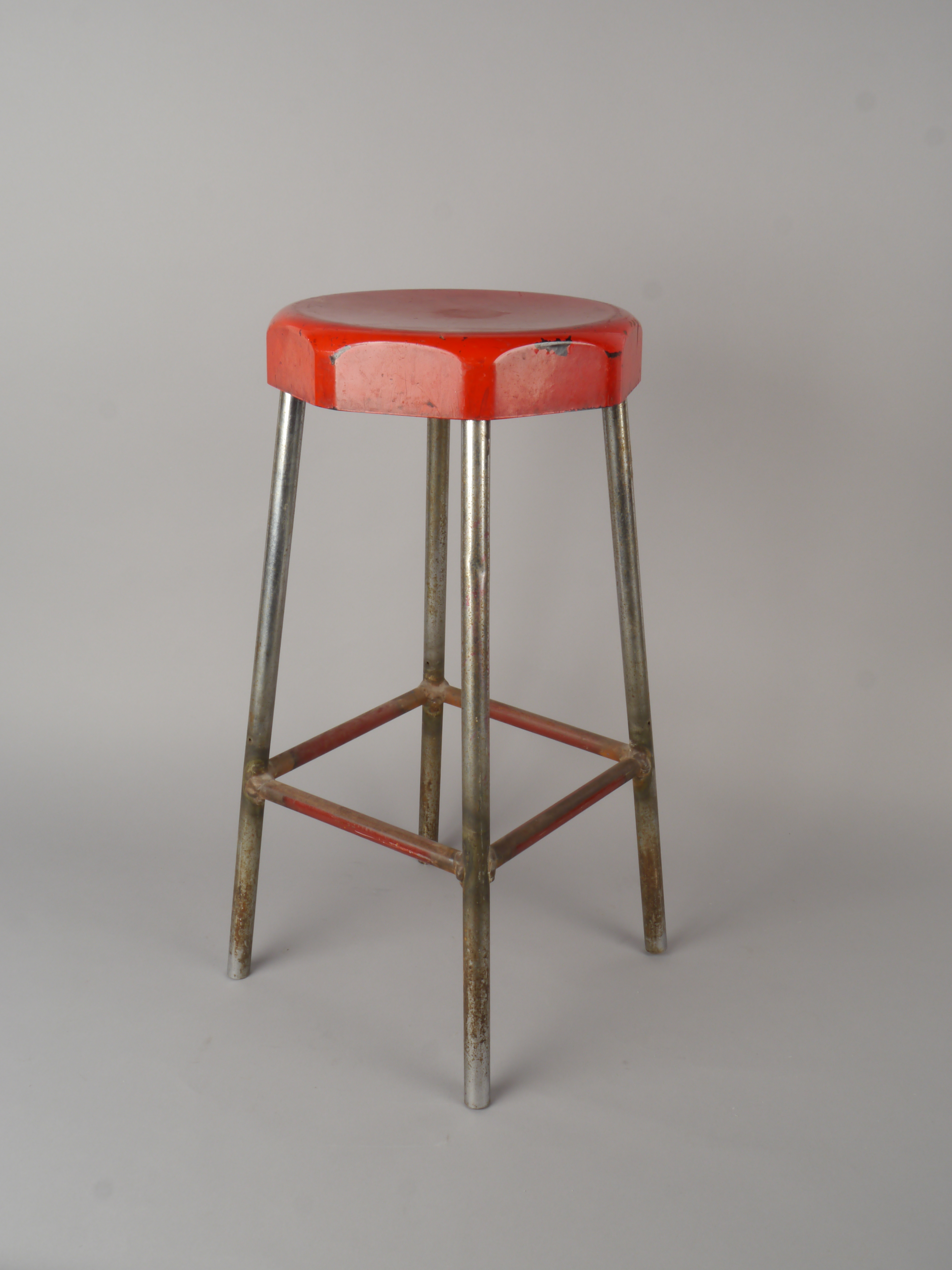
Stool in red painted bakelite, supported by four chrome legs, from the Vyncoluxe series by the manufacturer Vynckier in Ghent. Collection Museum of Industry Ghent

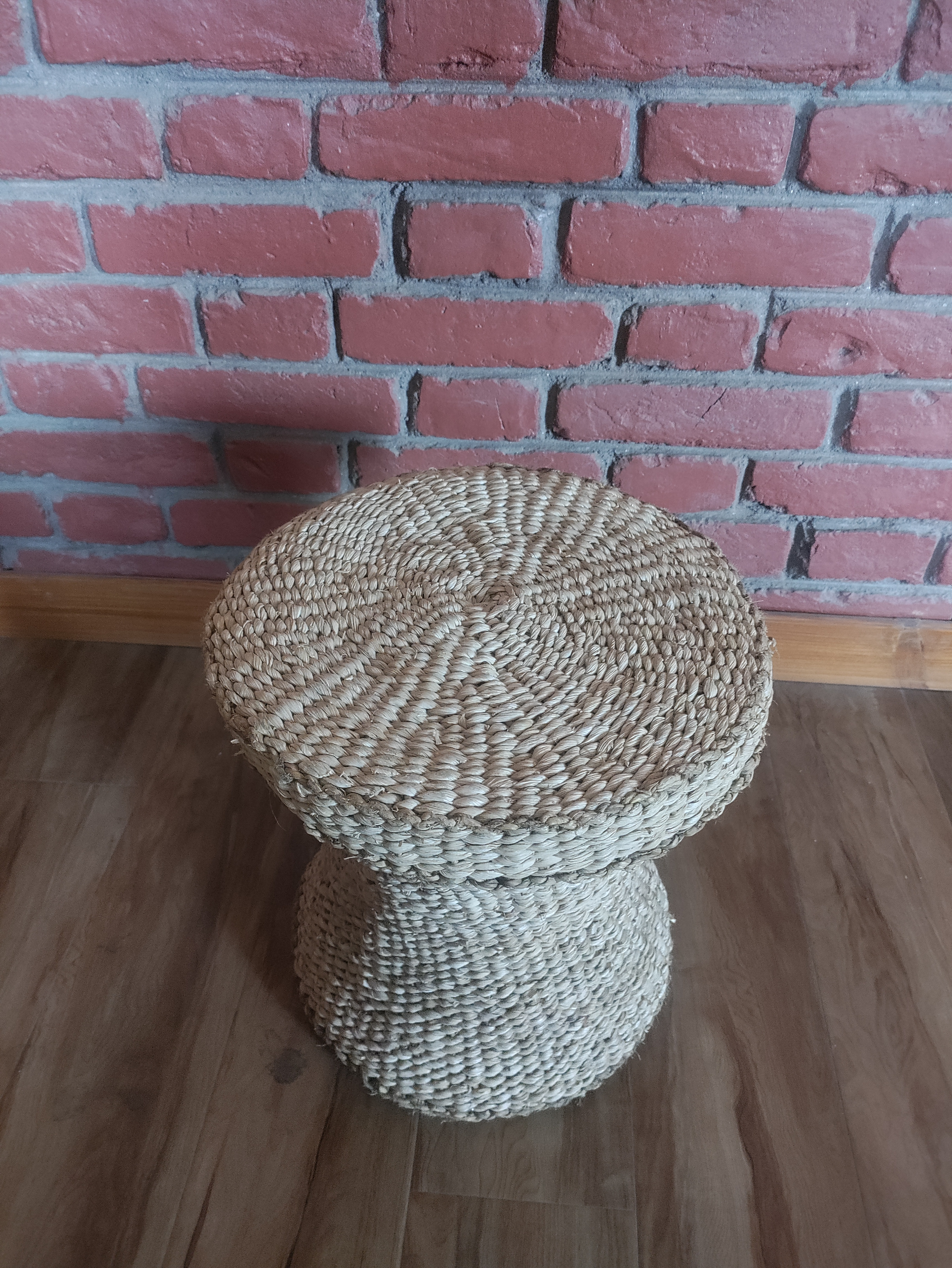
Handmade Stool from Nepal

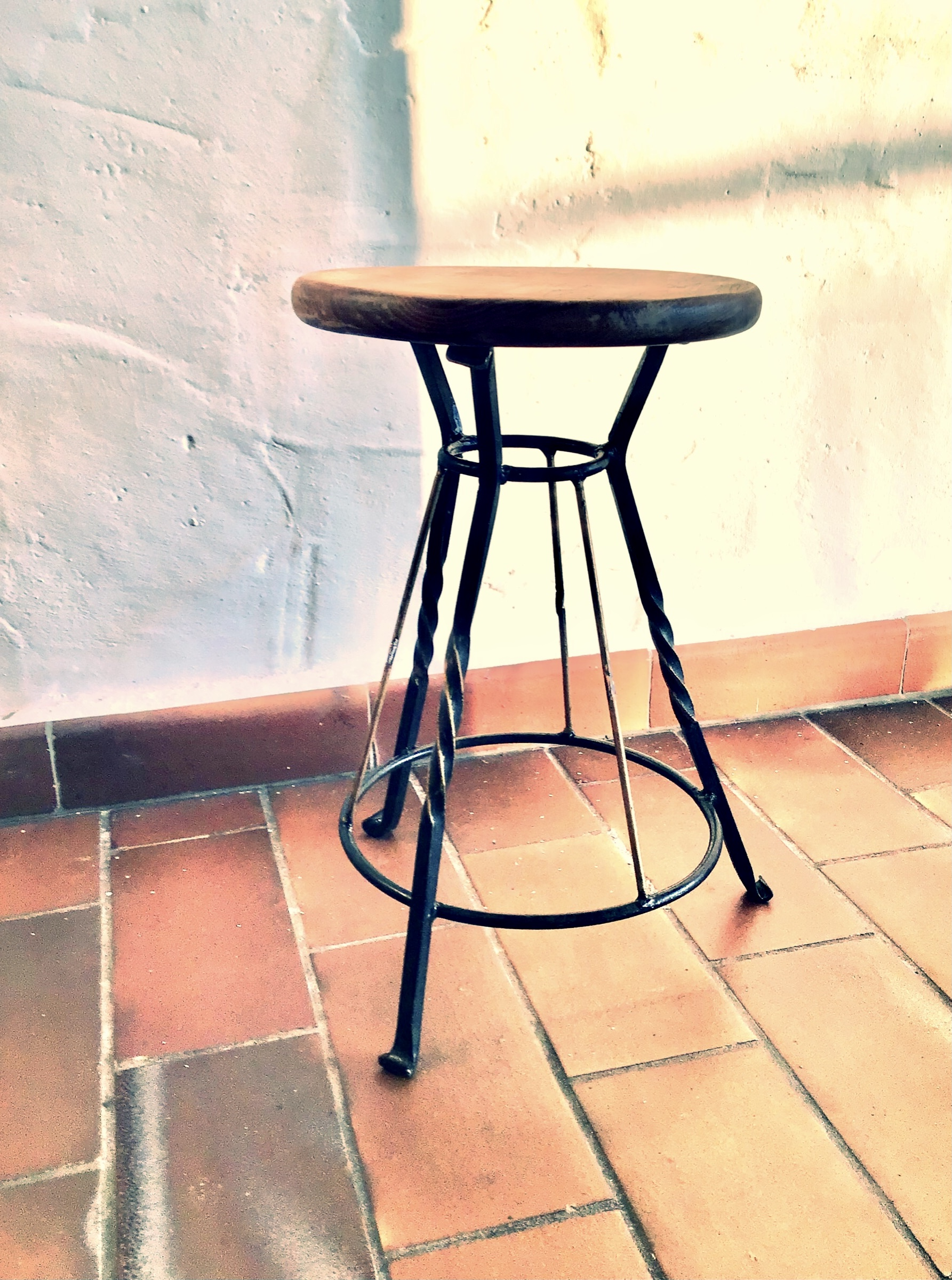
Pub stool from 1910, Ireland

Early modern stool made of wood

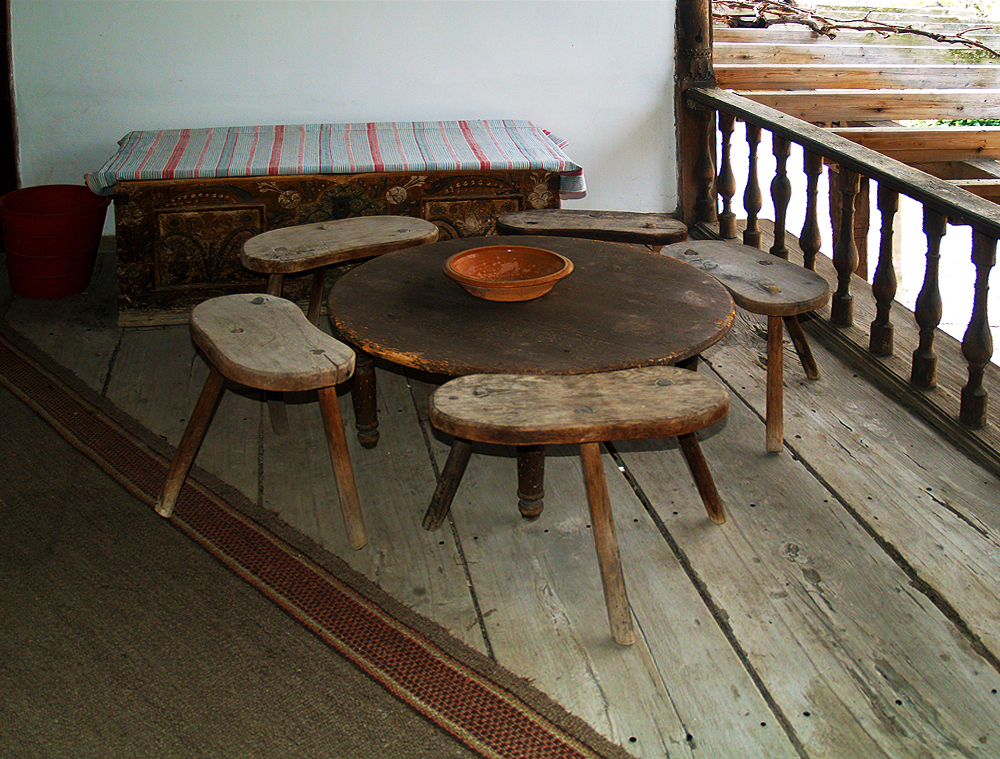
Table and stools from Bulgaria

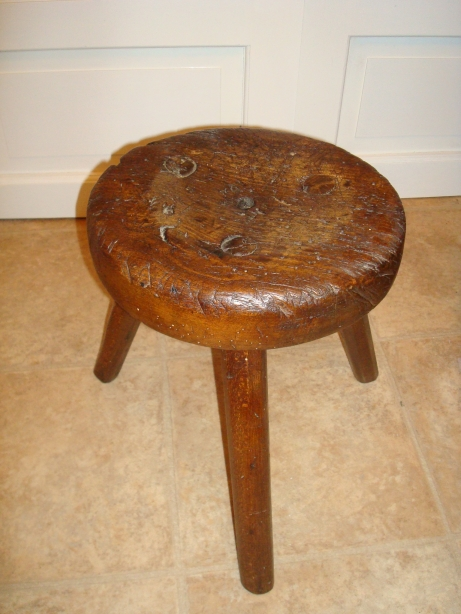
Milking stool

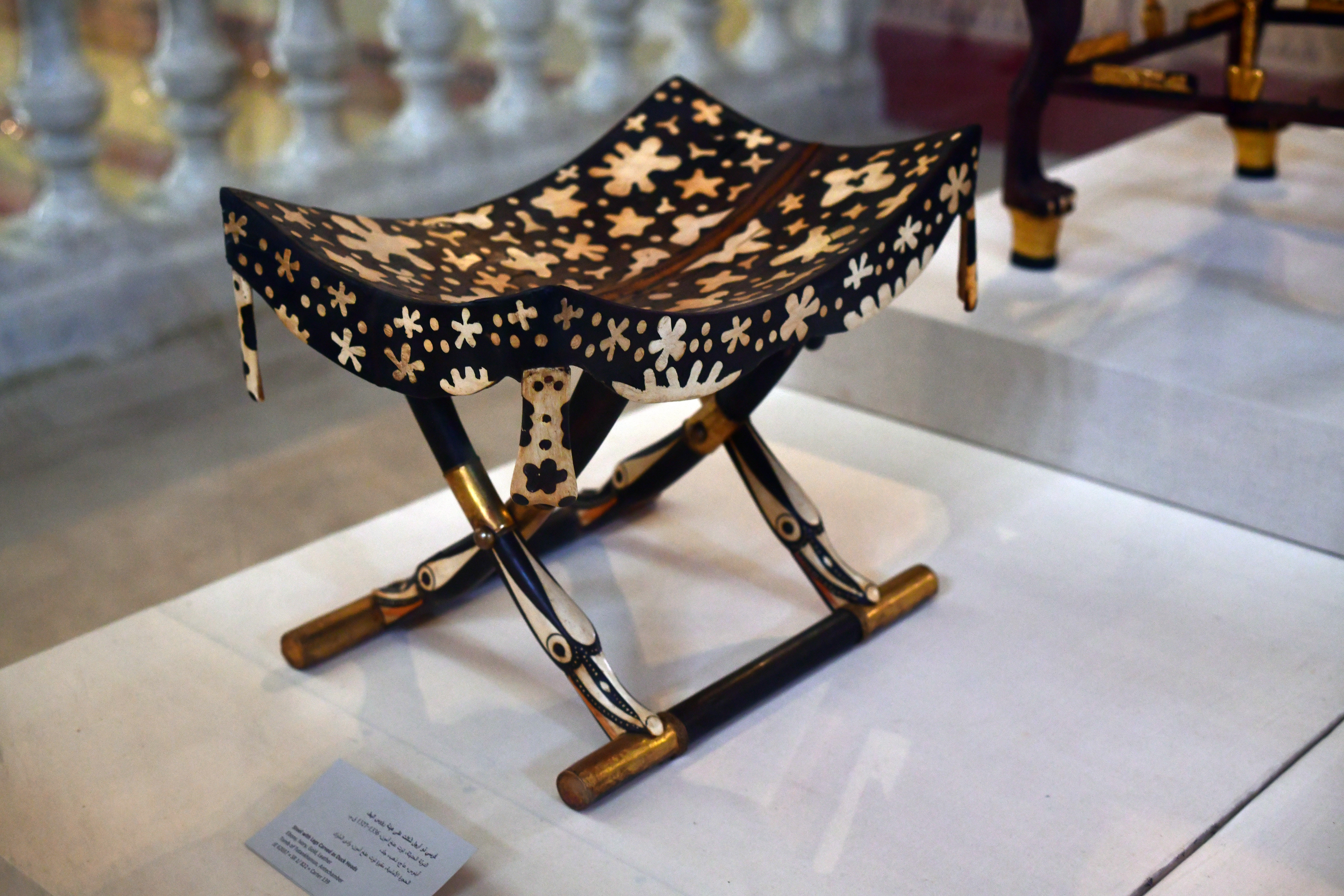
Tutankhamun's stool from his tomb

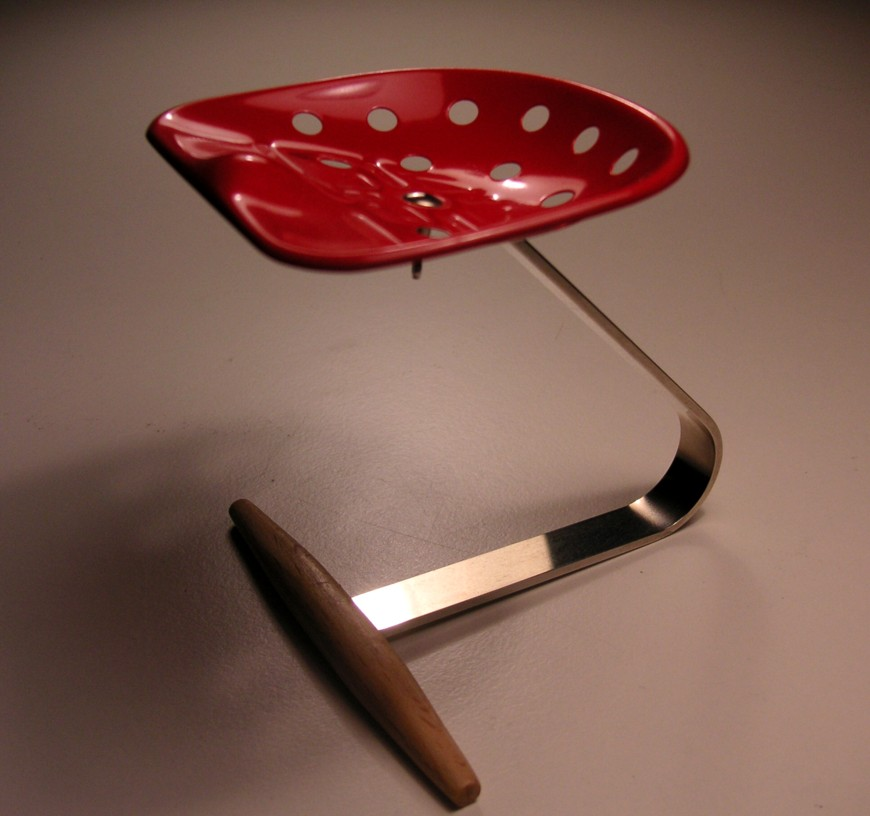
Mezzadro stool designed by Achille and Pier Giacomo Castiglioni for Zanotta (1957)

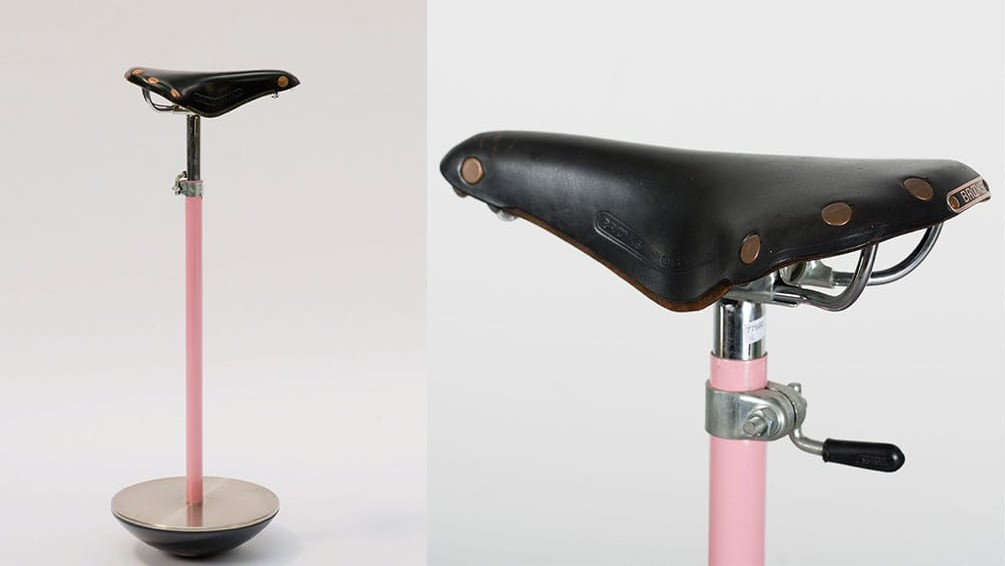
Sella stool by Achille and Pier Giacomo Castiglioni for Zanotta (1957)

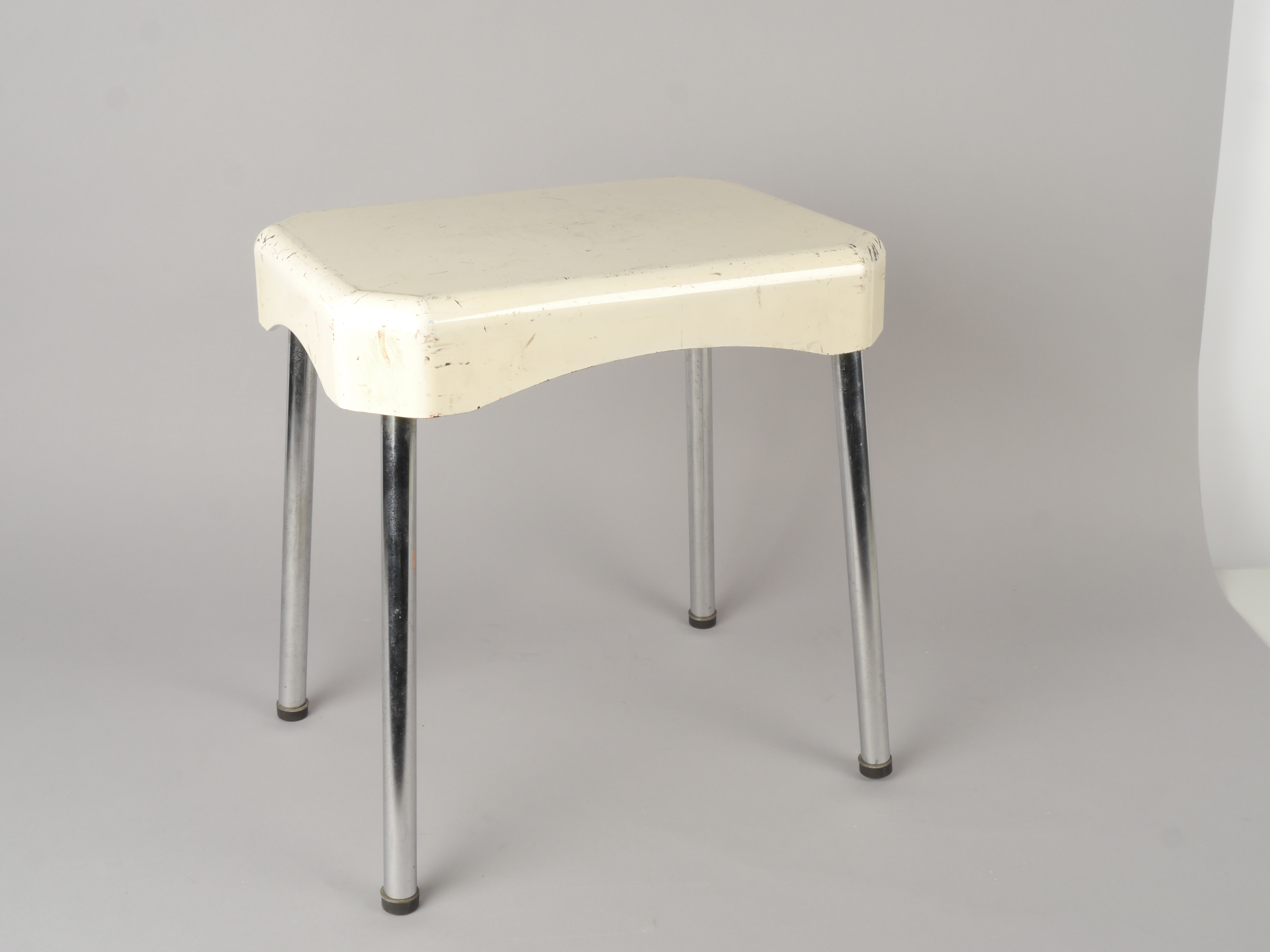
Stool in white painted bakelite, from the Supra Luxe series by the manufacturer Vynckier in Ghent. Collection Museum of Industry Ghent.

== See also ==
- Faldstool
- Footstool
- Taboret
- Seat
- List of chairs
