= Chair =

Piece of furniture for sitting on

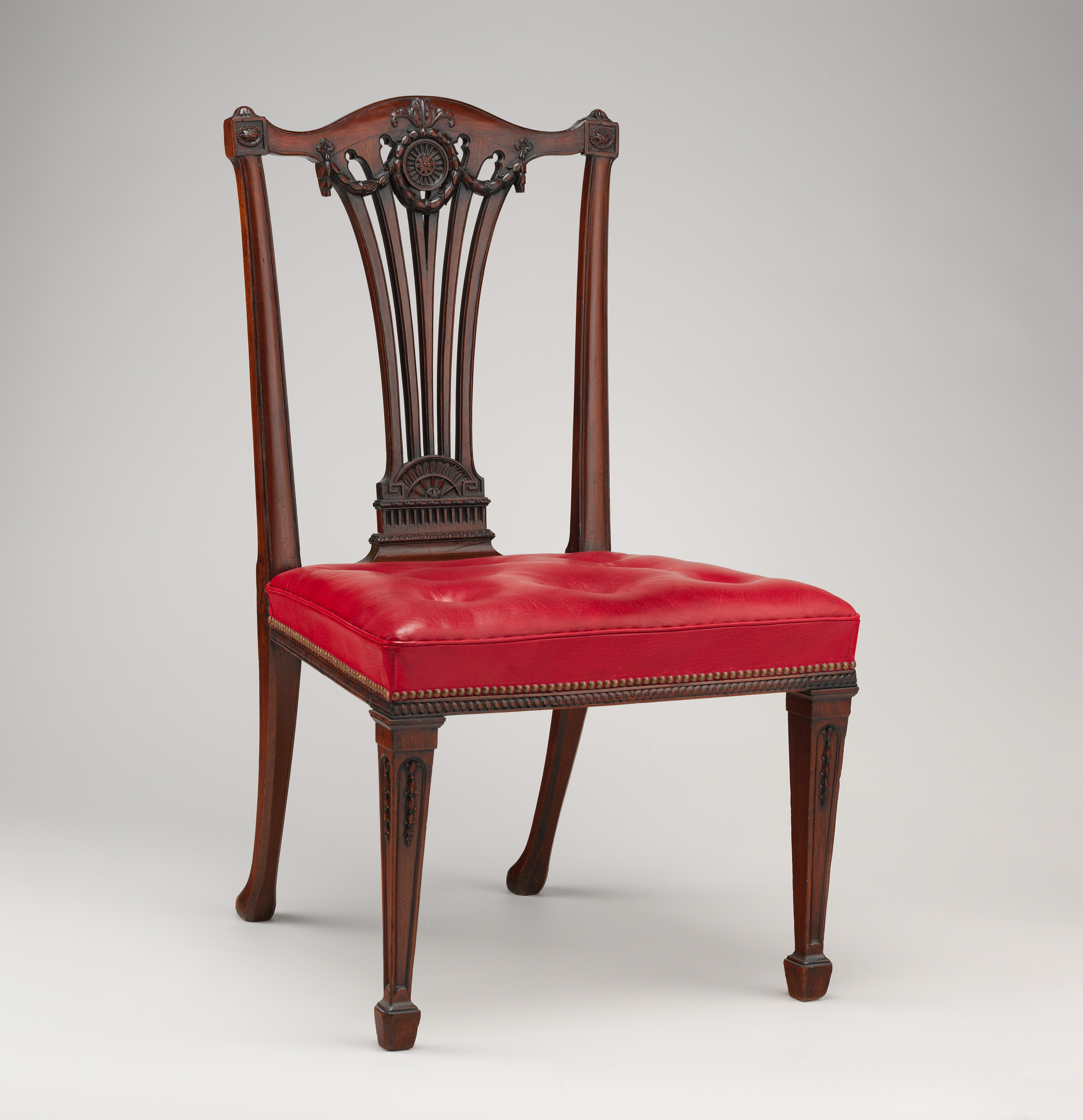
Chair, c. 1772, mahogany, covered in modern red morocco leather, height: 97.2 cm, Metropolitan Museum of Art (New York City)

A chair (/t͡ʃɛɚ/) is a type of seat, typically designed for one person and consisting of one or more legs, a flat or slightly angled seat, and a back rest. It may be made of wood, metal, or synthetic materials, and may be padded or upholstered in various colors and fabrics.

Chairs vary in design. An armchair has armrests fixed to the seat; a recliner is upholstered and features a mechanism that lowers the chair's back and raises into place a footrest; a rocking chair has legs fixed to two long curved slats; and a wheelchair has wheels fixed to an axis under the seat.

== Etymology ==
Chair comes from the early 13th-century English word chaere, from Old French chaiere ("chair, seat, throne"), from Latin cathedra and ultimately Greek καθέδρα kathedra ("seat, throne").

== History ==
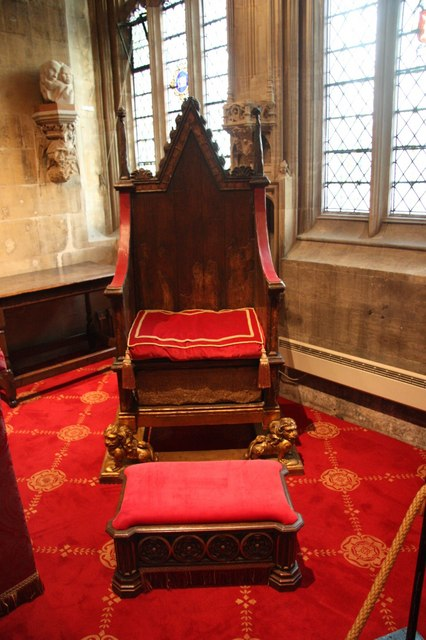
The Coronation Chair, c. 1300

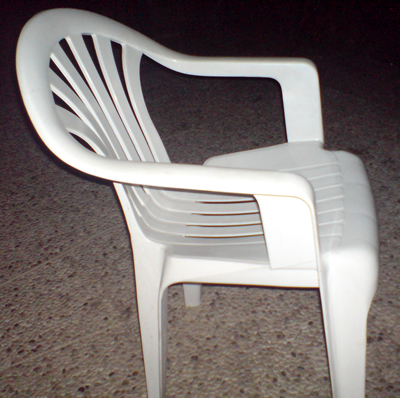
The Monobloc chair is a lightweight stackable polypropylene chair, usually white in colour, often described as the world's most common plastic chair.

The chair has been used since antiquity, although for many centuries it was a symbolic article of state and dignity rather than an article for ordinary use. "The chair" is still used as the emblem of authority in the House of Commons in the United Kingdom and Canada, and in many other settings. In keeping with this historical connotation of the "chair" as the symbol of authority, committees, boards of directors, and academic departments all have a 'chairman' or 'chair'. Endowed professorships are referred to as chairs. It was not until the 16th century that chairs became common. Until then, people sat on chests, benches, and stools, which were the ordinary seats of everyday life. The number of chairs which have survived from an earlier date is exceedingly limited; most examples are of ecclesiastical, seigneurial or feudal origin.

Chairs have existed since at least the Early Dynastic Period of Egypt (c. 3100 BC). They were covered with cloth or leather, were made of carved wood, and were much lower than today's chairs – chair seats were sometimes only 10 inches (25 cm) high. In ancient Egypt, chairs appear to have been of great richness and splendor. Fashioned of ebony and ivory, or of carved and gilded wood, they were covered with costly materials, magnificent patterns and supported upon representations of the legs of beasts or the figures of captives. Generally speaking, the higher ranked an individual was, the taller and more sumptuous was the chair he sat on and the greater the honor. On state occasions, the pharaoh sat on a throne, often with a little footstool in front of it.

The average Egyptian family seldom had chairs, and if they did, it was usually only the master of the household who sat on a chair. Among the better off, the chairs might be painted to look like the ornate inlaid and carved chairs of the rich, but the craftsmanship was usually poor.

The earliest images of chairs in China are from 6th-century Buddhist murals and stele, but the practice of sitting in chairs at that time was rare. It was not until the 12th century that chairs became widespread in China. Scholars disagree on the reasons for the adoption of the chair. The most common theories are that the chair was an outgrowth of indigenous Chinese furniture, that it evolved from a camp stool imported from Central Asia, that it was introduced to China by Christian missionaries in the 7th century, and that the chair came to China from India as a form of Buddhist monastic furniture. In modern China, unlike Korea or Japan, it is no longer common to sit at floor level.

In Europe, it was owing in great measure to the Renaissance that the chair ceased to be a privilege of state and became a standard item of furniture for anyone who could afford to buy it. Once the idea of privilege faded, the chair speedily came into general use. Almost at once, the chair began to change every few years to reflect the fashions of the day.

Thomas Edward Bowdich visited the main Palace of the Ashanti Empire in 1819 and observed chairs engrossed with gold in the empire. In the 1800s, chairs became more common in American households and usually there was a chair provided for every family member to sit down to dinner. By the 1830s, factory-manufactured “fancy chairs” like those by Sears, Roebuck, and Co. allowed families to purchase machined sets. With the Industrial Revolution, chairs became much more available.

The 20th century saw an increasing use of technology in chair construction with such things as all-metal folding chairs, metal-legged chairs, the Slumber Chair, moulded plastic chairs and ergonomic chairs. The recliner became a popular form, at least in part due to radio and television. In the 1930s, stair lifts were commercially available to help people suffering from Polio and other diseases to navigate stairs.

The modern movement of the 1960s produced new forms of chairs: the butterfly chair (originally called the Hardoy chair), bean bags, and the egg-shaped pod chair that turns. It also introduced the first mass-produced plastic chairs such as the Bofinger chair in 1966. Technological advances led to molded plywood and wood laminate chairs, as well as chairs made of leather or polymers. Mechanical technology incorporated into the chair enabled adjustable chairs, especially for office use. Motors embedded in the chair resulted in massage chairs.

== Materials ==
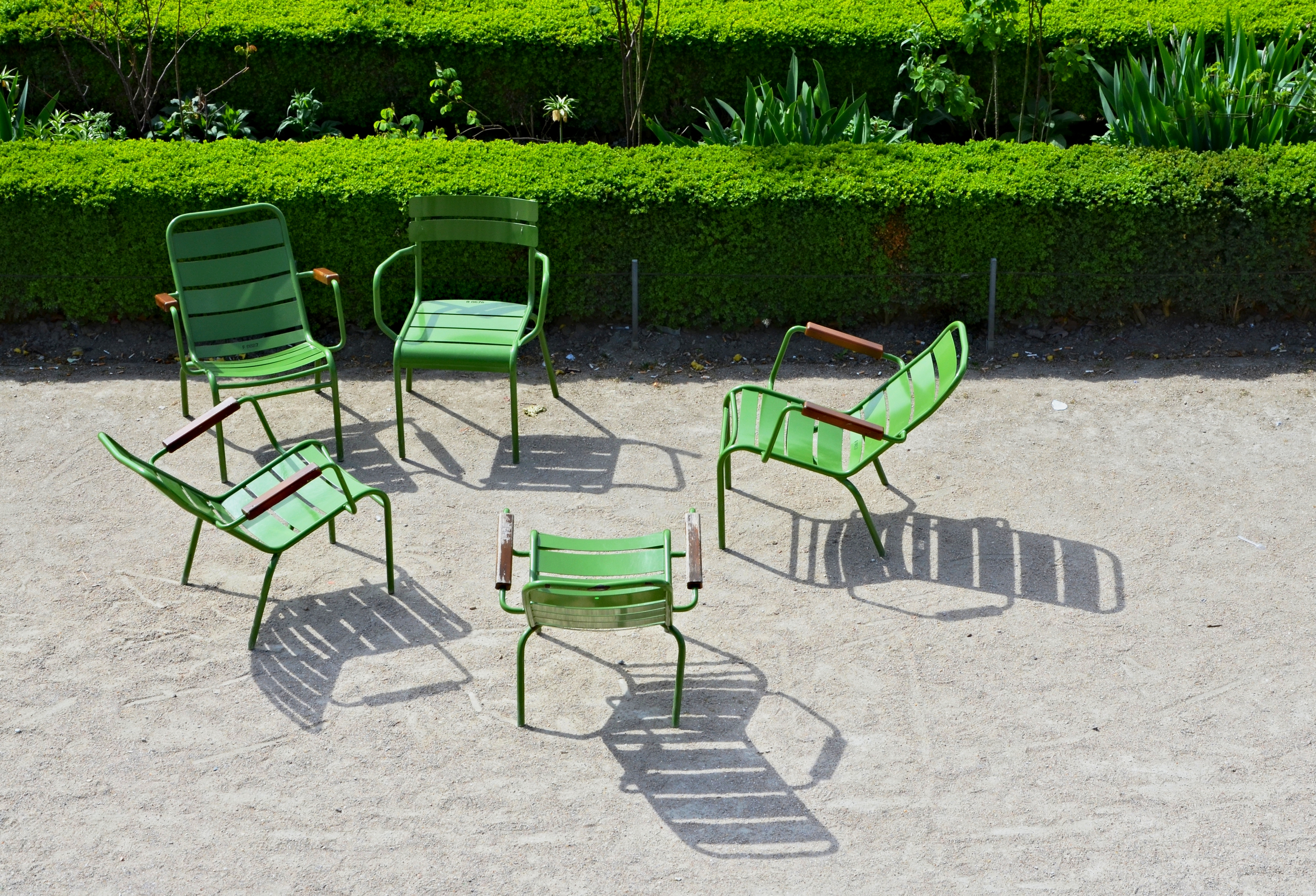
Metal chairs in the Tuileries Garden, Paris, France

Chairs can be made from wood, metal, or other strong materials, like stone or acrylic. In some cases, multiple materials are used to construct a chair; for example, the legs and frame may be made from metal and the seat and back may be made from plastic. Chairs may have hard surfaces of wood, metal, plastic, or other materials, or some or all of these hard surfaces may be covered with upholstery or padding. The design may be made of porous materials or be drilled with holes for decoration; a low back or gaps can provide ventilation. The back may extend above the height of the occupant's head, which can optionally contain a headrest. Chairs can also be made from more creative materials, such as recycled materials like cutlery and wooden play bricks, pencils, plumbing tubes, rope, corrugated cardboard, and PVC pipe. The Kelp Chair, for example, is 3D-printed from recycled fishing net plastic and wood fibre.

In rare cases, chairs are made out of unusual materials, especially as a form of art or experimentation. Raimonds Cirulis, a Latvian interior designer, created a volcanic hanging chair that is handmade out of volcanic rock. Peter Brenner, a Dutch-born German designer, has created a chair made from lollipop sugar – 60 pounds (27 kg) of confectioners' sugar.

== Design and ergonomics ==
Chair design considers intended usage, ergonomics (how comfortable it is for the occupant), as well as non-ergonomic functional requirements such as size, stacking ability, folding ability, weight, durability, stain resistance, and artistic design.

=== Seat height ===
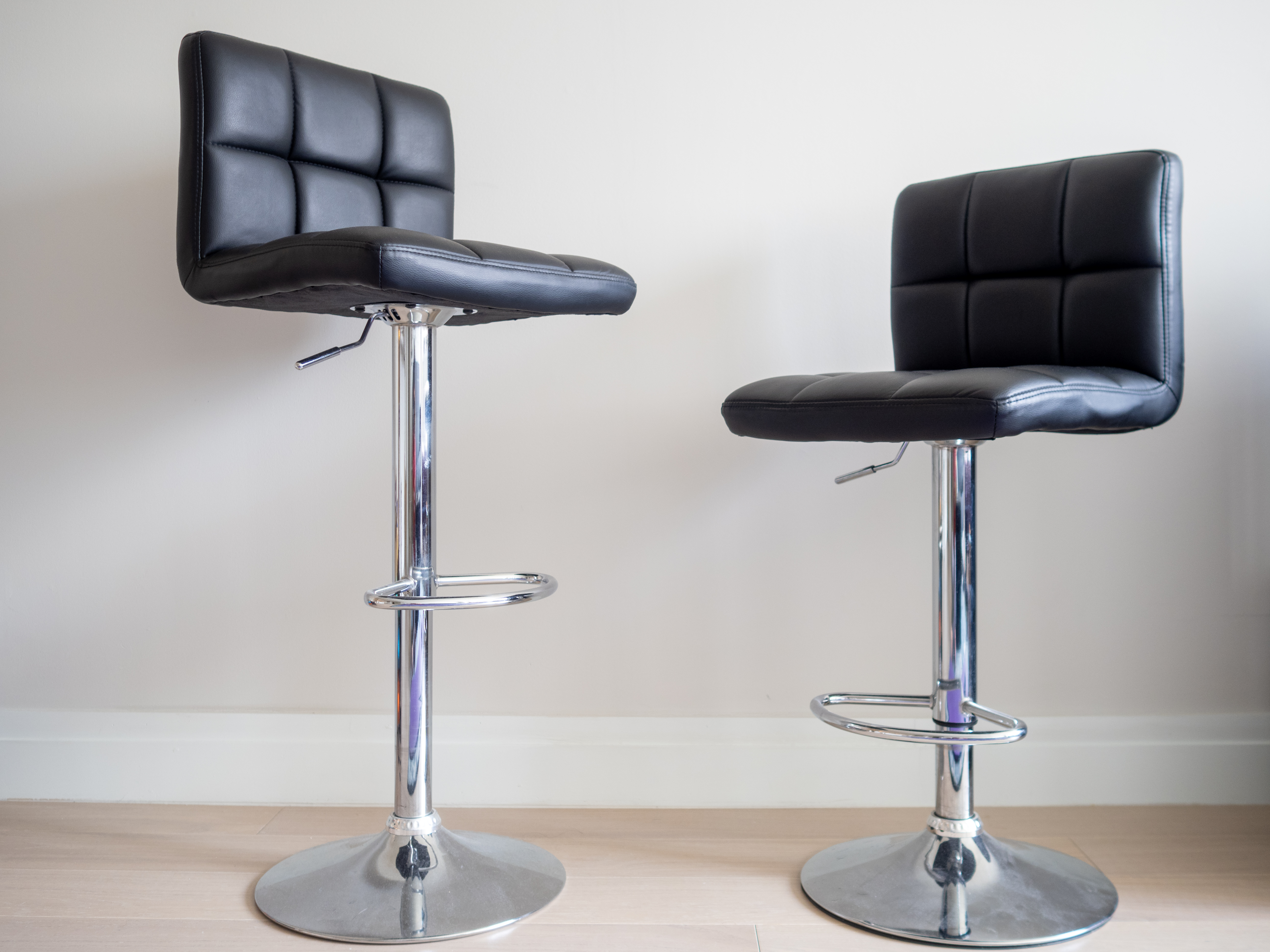
Seats with adjustable height

Ergonomic design distributes the weight of the occupant to various parts of the body. This is done by having an easily adjustable seat height. A seat that is higher results in dangling feet and increased pressure on the underside of the knees ("popliteal fold"). It may also result in no weight on the feet which means more weight elsewhere. A lower seat may shift too much weight to the "seat bones" ("ischial tuberosities"). Gas springs are attached to the body of the chair in order to give height adjustment and more comfort to the user.

Some chairs have foot rests. Around 15% of women and 2% of men need foot rests, even at the 16-inch (41 cm) chair height. A stool or other simple chair may have a simple straight or curved bar near the bottom for the sitter to place their feet on.

Actual chair dimensions are determined by measurements of the human body or anthropometric measurements. The two most relevant anthropometric measurements for chair design are the popliteal height and buttock popliteal length.

For someone seated, the popliteal height is the distance from the underside of the foot to the underside of the thigh at the knees. It is sometimes called the "stool height". The term "sitting height" is reserved for the height to the top of the head when seated. For American men, the median popliteal height is 16.3 inches (41 cm) and for American women it is 15.0 inches (38 cm). The popliteal height, after adjusting for heels, clothing and other issues, is used to determine the height of the chair seat. Mass-produced chairs are typically 17 inches (43 cm) high.

Researchers such as Mary Blade and Galen Cranz found that sitting on the edge of a high stool with feet on the floor is less harmful for the lower back than sitting up straight on a conventional chair.

=== Reclining angle ===
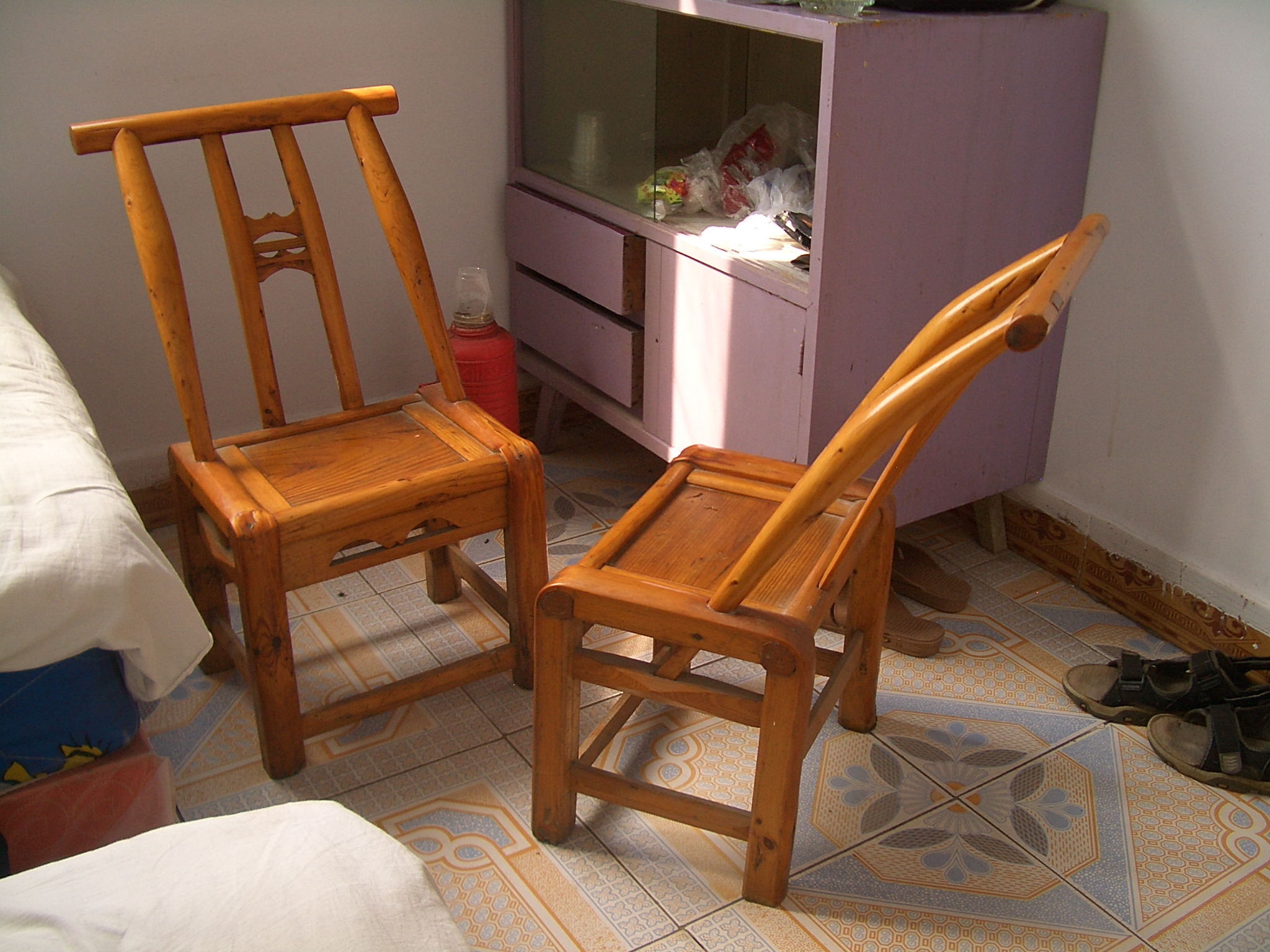
The type of chair popular in western Hubei, China: with a fairly low seat and the back inclined at about 45 degrees from the vertical

Different types of chairs can have a variety of seating positions, depending on the intended task. Typically, chairs intended for people completing work or dining can only recline very slightly (otherwise the occupant is too far away from the desk or table). Dental chairs are necessarily reclined. Research has shown that the best seated posture is a reclined posture of 100°–110°. In order to recline, the back-rest may be independently adjustable. A reclining seat and back will reduce the load on the occupant's back muscles. In general, if the occupant is supposed to sit for a long time, weight needs to be taken off the seat area and thus "easy" chairs intended for long periods of sitting are generally at least slightly reclined.

=== Back and head support ===
The back of the chair will support some of the weight of the occupant, reducing the weight on other parts of the body. Some back-rests support only the lumbar region, while shoulder height back-rests support the entire back and shoulders. Headrests support the head as well and are important in vehicles for preventing "whiplash" neck injuries in rear-end collisions where the head is jerked back suddenly. Reclining chairs typically have at least shoulder-height back-rests to shift weight to the shoulders.

=== Padding ===
There may be cases where padding is not desirable, such as chairs that are intended primarily for outdoor use. Where padding is not desirable, contouring may be used instead. A contoured seat pan attempts to distribute weight without padding. By matching the shape of the occupant's buttocks, weight is distributed and maximum pressure is reduced.

=== Armrests ===
A chair may or may not have armrests; chairs with armrests are termed "armchairs". In French, a distinction is made between fauteuil and chaise, the terms for chairs with and without armrests, respectively. In Germany, an armchair was once called a Krankensessel, or sick-chair, because it was intended for people who were too ill to stand or sit without extra support.

If present, armrests will support part of the body weight through the arms if the arms are resting on the armrests. Elbow rest height is used to determine the height of the armrests. Armrests should support the forearm and not the sensitive elbow area. Hence, in some chair designs, the armrest is not continuous to the chair back but is missing in the elbow area. Armrests further have the function of making entry and exit from the chair easier (but from the side it becomes more difficult).

=== Seat size and legroom ===
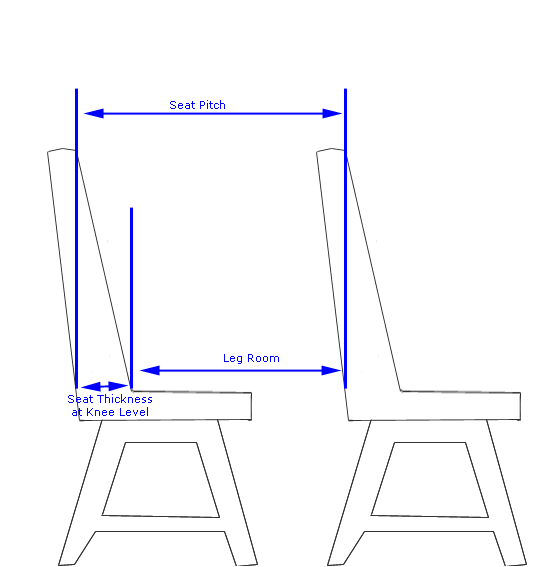
The difference between leg room and seat pitch

For someone seated, the buttock popliteal length is the horizontal distance from the back most part of the buttocks to the back of the lower leg. This anthropometric measurement is used to determine the seat depth. Mass-produced chairs are typically 15–17 inches (38–43 cm) deep.

Additional anthropometric measurements may be relevant to designing a chair. Hip breadth is used for chair width and armrest width. The buttock-knee length is used to determine "leg room" between rows of chairs. "Seat pitch" is the distance between rows of seats. In some airplanes and stadiums, the leg room (the seat pitch less the thickness of the seat at thigh level) is so small that it is sometimes insufficient for the average person.

== Types of chairs ==
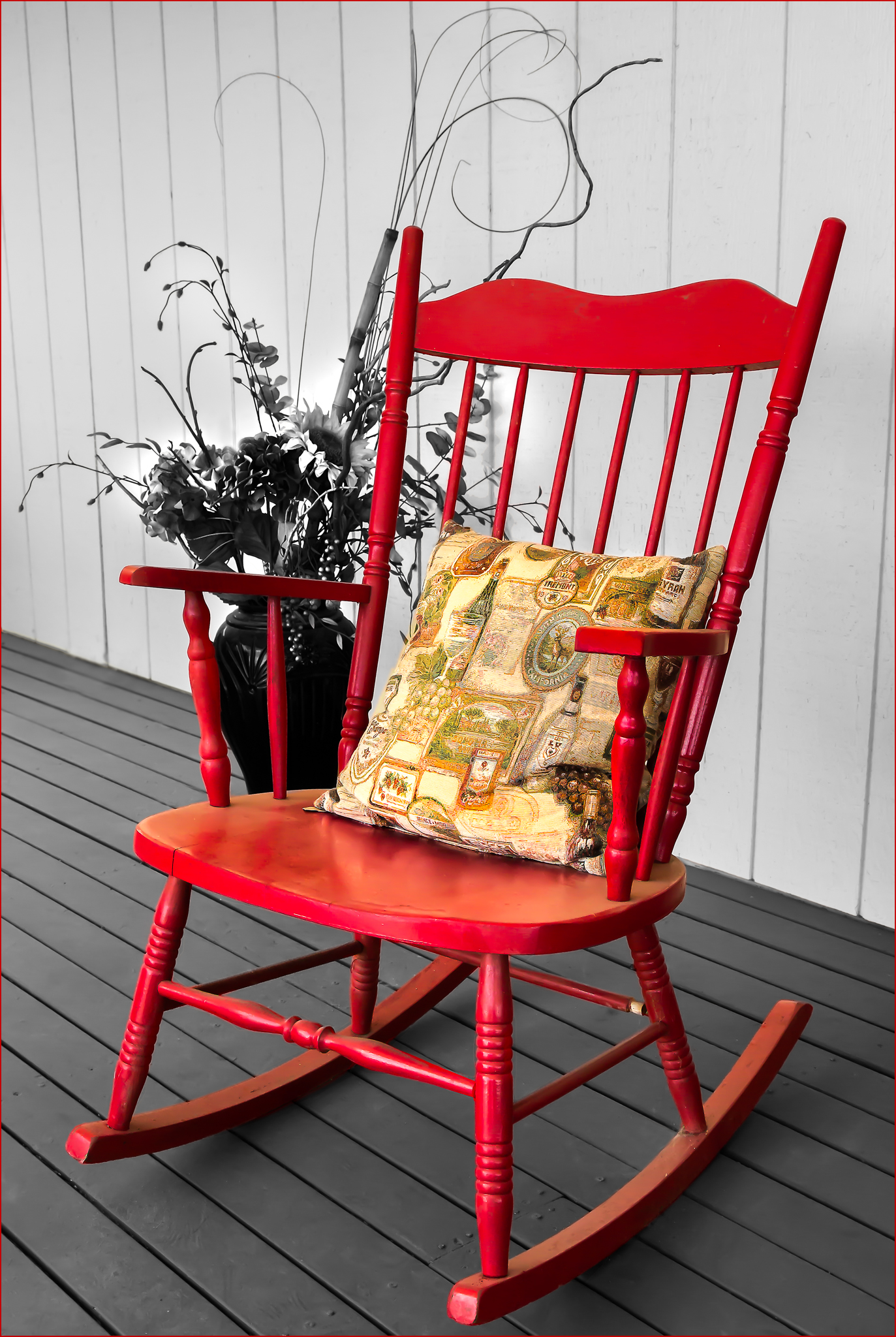
A rocking chair

A wide variety of chairs have emerged throughout the ages, some based on formal usages, others based on domestic needs, and some based on needs within the workplace or various professions.

=== Office chair ===
An office chair is one used by employees within an office, including desk chairs and task chairs. Modern office chairs are usually adjustable and wheeled. Caster wheels are attached to the feet of chairs to give more mobility.

=== Dining room chair ===
A dining room chair is a specific type of design used around a dining room table. It can be found in most ordinary residential homes and may appear in formal settings, such as any formal event or reception that includes a formal meal or banquet.

=== Work chair ===
A work chair is a specialized chair adapted to the needs of a particular profession or setting. For example, a designing chair will be used for designers who sit at high easels; it will usually have added height.

=== Rocking chair ===
Some chairs have two curved bands of wood (also known as rockers) attached to the bottom of the legs. They are called rocking chairs.

=== Kneeling chair ===
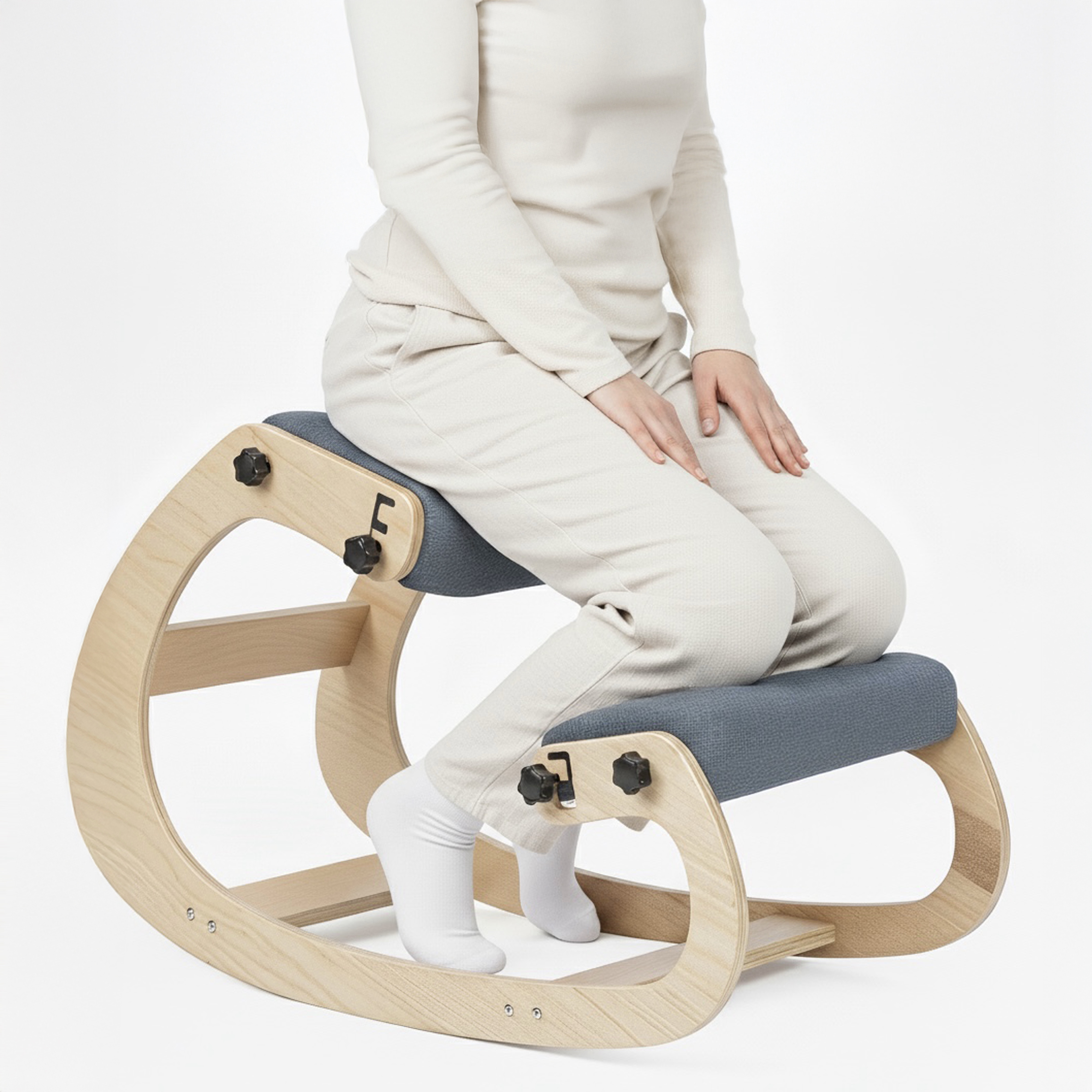
Kneeling chair

A kneeling chair adds an additional body part, the knees, to support the weight of the body. A sit-stand chair distributes most of the weight of the occupant to the feet. Many chairs are padded or have cushions. Padding can be on the seat of the chair only, on the seat and back, or also on any arm rests or foot rest the chair may have. Padding will not shift the weight to different parts of the body (unless the chair is so soft that the shape is altered). However, padding does distribute the weight by increasing the area of contact between the chair and the body, thus reducing the amount of pressure at any given point. By contrast, a hard wood chair feels hard because the contact point between the occupant and the chair is small. In lieu of padding, flexible materials, such as wicker, may be used instead with similar effects of distributing the weight.

== Standards and specifications ==
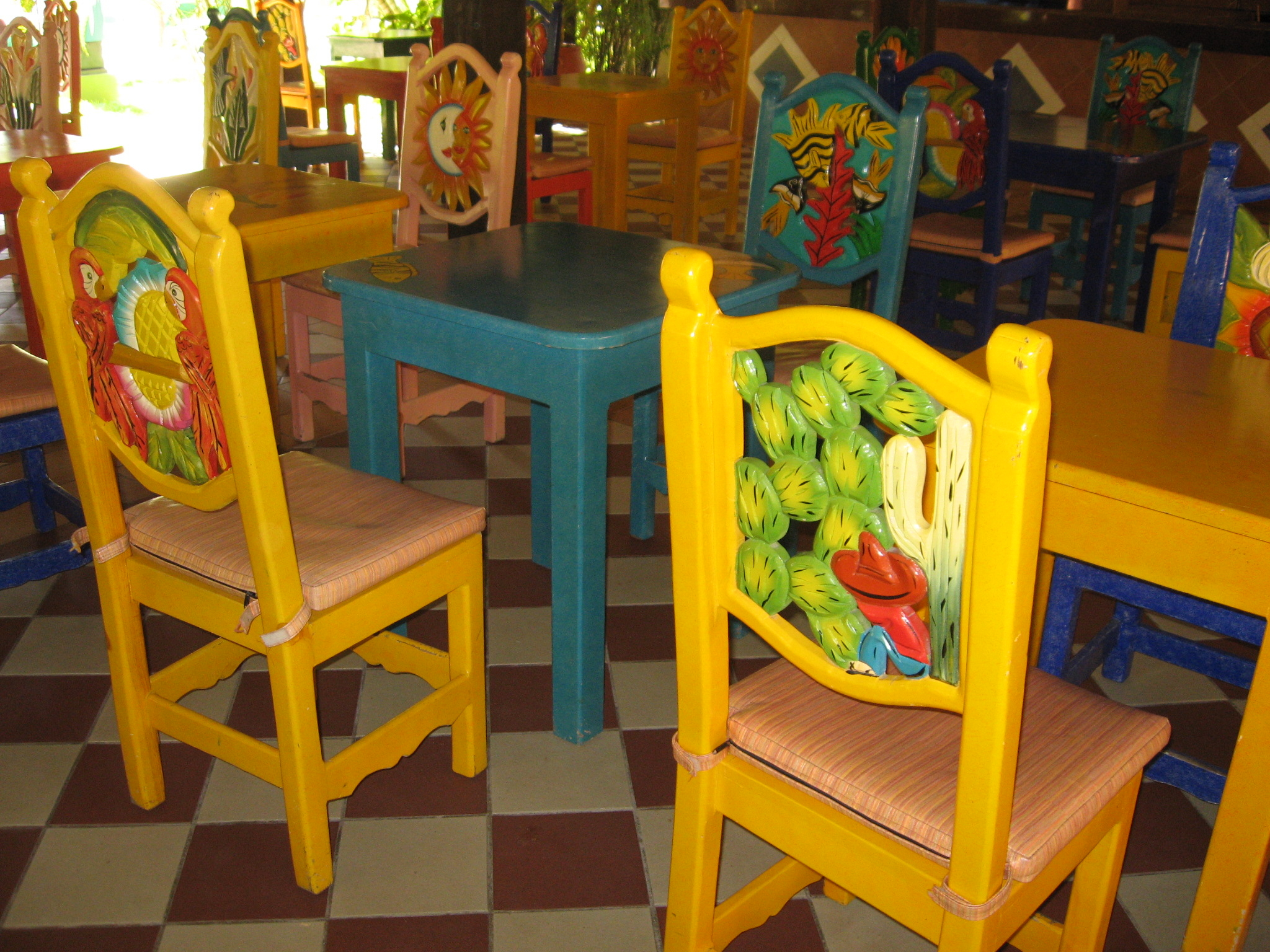
Highly decorated carved-back chairs in Mexico

Design considerations for chairs have been codified into standards. ISO 9241, "Ergonomic requirements for office work with visual display terminals (VDTs) – Part 5: Workstation layout and postural requirements", is the most common one for modern chair design.

There are multiple specific standards for different types of chairs. Dental chairs are specified by ISO 6875. Bean bag chairs are specified by ANSI standard ASTM F1912-98. ISO 7174 specifies stability of rocking and tilting chairs. ASTM F1858-98 specifies plastic lawn chairs. ASTM E1822-02b defines the combustibility of chairs when they are stacked.

The Business and Institutional Furniture Manufacturer's Association (BIFMA) defines ANSI/BIFMA X5.1 (titled: General-Purpose Office Chairs – Tests) for testing of commercial-grade chairs. It requires:

- chair back strength of 150 pounds (68 kg)
- chair stability if weight is transferred completely to the front or back legs
- leg strength of 75 pounds (34 kg) applied one inch (25 mm) from the bottom of the leg
- seat strength of 225 pounds (102 kg) dropped from six inches (150 mm) above the seat
- seat cycle strength of 100,000 repetitions of 125 pounds (57 kg) dropped from 2 inches (51 mm) above the seat

The specification further defines heavier "proof" loads that chairs must withstand. Under these higher loads, the chair may be damaged, but it must not fail catastrophically.

Large institutions that make bulk purchases will reference these standards within their own even more detailed criteria for purchase. Governments will often issue standards for purchases by government agencies (e.g. Canada's Canadian General Standards Board CAN/CGSB 44.15M on "Straight Stacking Chair, Steel" or CAN/CGSB 44.232-2002 on "Task Chairs for Office Work with Visual Display Terminal").

Chairs may be rated by the length of time that they may be used comfortably – an 8-hour chair, a 24-hour chair, and so on. Such chairs are specified for tasks which require extended periods of sitting, such as for receptionists or supervisors of a control panel.

== Alternative uses ==
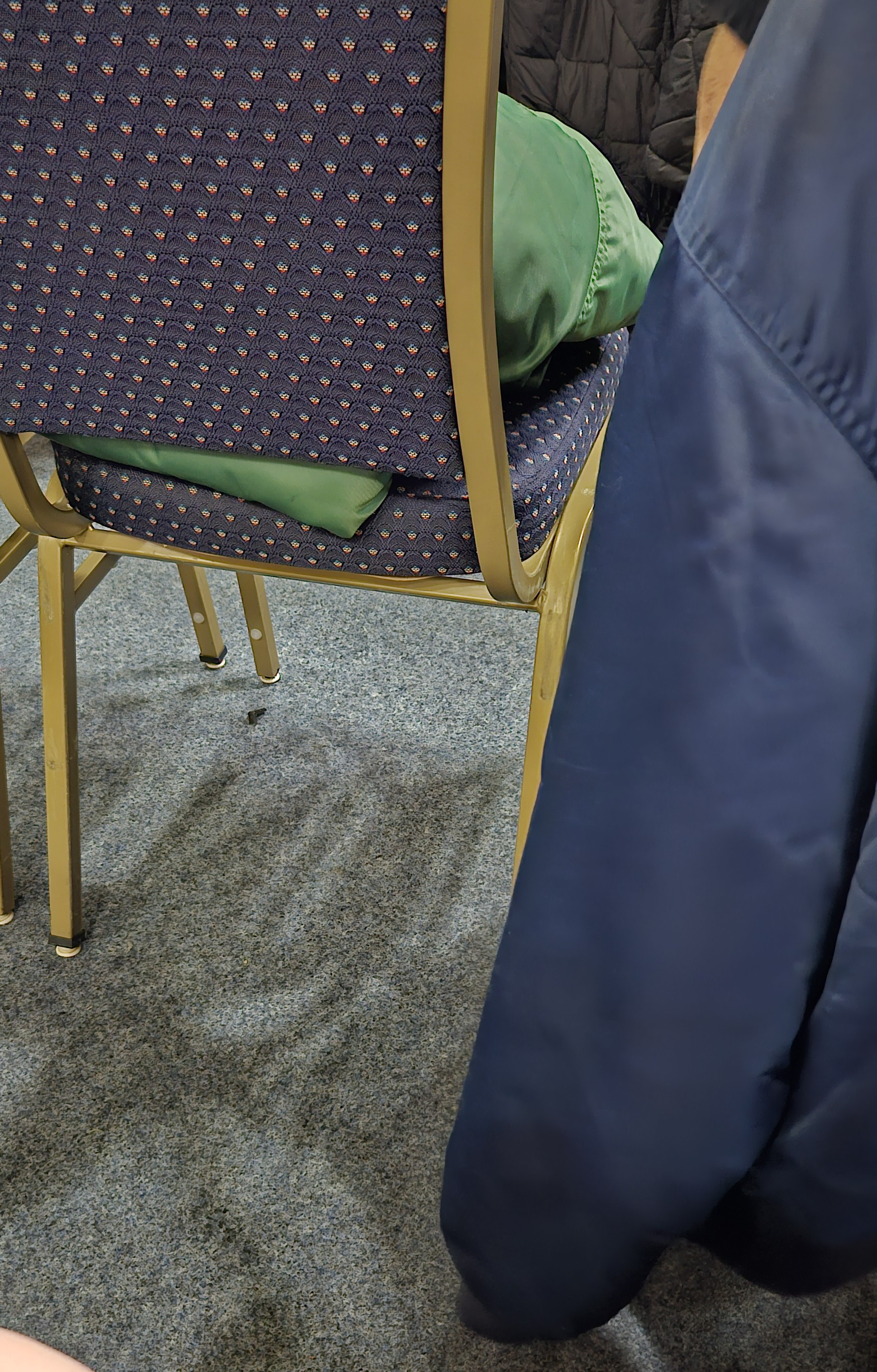
Jackets stored on chairs

While chairs are designed to be used for sitting, they are sometimes used for other purposes. They are commonly used to temporarily store clothes that can be worn again before they need to be washed or to hold coats and jackets in places like waiting rooms. People often stand on chairs when a ladder or step stool is unavailable, but this practice is considered to be unsafe. They are also used to block doors in emergencies.

== As sculptural and art forms ==
Christo created Wrapped Chair in 1961 with found objects (chairs), lacquer, canvas, rope, and paint. It is an early work showing his and his wife Jeanne Claude’s iconic style of partially or wholly hiding objects within wrapped cloth and ropes. Their work developed into large-scale public site-specific artworks and environmental art, which the pair are most well known for. For Wrapped Chair, Christo plays with the identity of the object by concealing parts and revealing others. There are multiple variations of this work and similar ones involving chairs displayed at museums around the world, including a similar work titled Two Wrapped Chairs from 1961.

In the same year that Christo created Wrapped Chair, Pablo Picasso also created La Chaise. Made of painted sheet metal, Picasso’s sculptural chair exemplifies what many artists love about the chair as a subject: the contrast of form and function.

One and Three Chairs, 1965, is a conceptual artwork created by Joseph Kosuth. The work is an assemblage of a manufactured chair, the photo of said chair, and the dictionary definition of the word chair. This work changes each time it is installed, since the location selects and photographs the chair for installation. A dominating part of Kosuth’s work is the impersonal aspect of all the parts since his artistic hand is not easily seen in the pre-made objects presented.

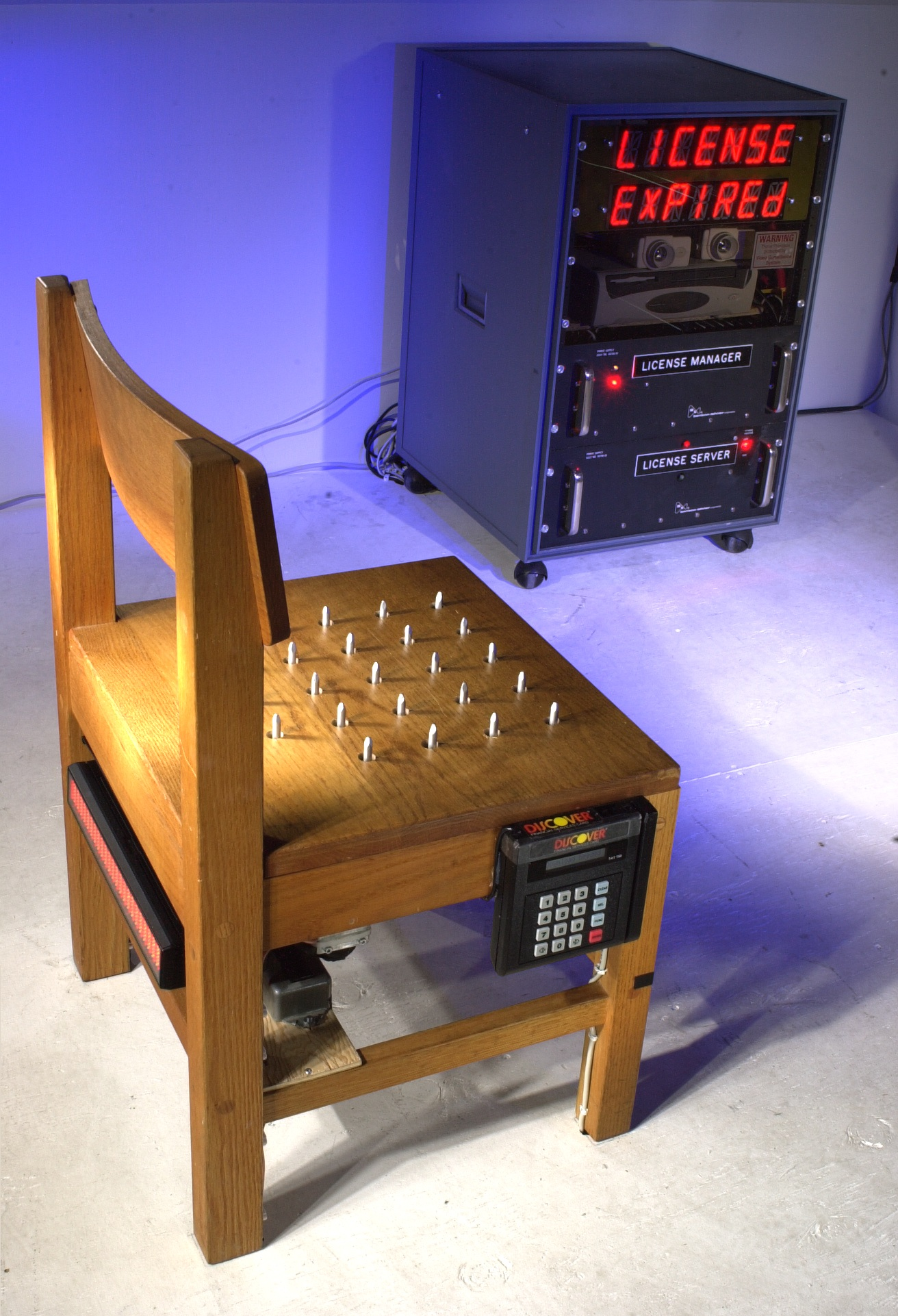
Chair sculpture by Steve Mann, exhibited at San Francisco Art Institute, 2001, comprises spikes that retract when a credit card is inserted to download a seating license.

The Broken Chair is a monumental sculpture in wood, constructed of 5.5 tons of wood, 12 metres (39 ft) high standing across the street from the Palace of Nations in Geneva. It has a broken leg symbolizing opposition to land mines and cluster bombs. In 2001, Steve Mann exhibited a chair sculpture at San Francisco Art Institute. The chair had spikes that retracted when a credit card was inserted to download a seating license. Later, other museums and galleries were equipped with the "Pay to Sit" chair, with a global central seating license server located in Toronto. The first sitting session was free, with a database of persons who had already used their free session.

In a performance piece at the 2012 Republican National Convention, Clint Eastwood addressed an empty chair, as if it represented President Barack Obama (meant to be construed as MIA or ineffectual). The address was controversial, with critics describing it as bizarre and supporters describing it as poignant. Japanese designer Tokujin Yoshioka has created several chairs as art forms such as "Honey-pop": honey-comb paper chair (2001), "Pane chair": natural fiber chair (2006), and "Venus": natural crystal chair (2007).

New York industrial designer Ian Stell creates steel and wood kinetic sculptures that transform into chairs, including Roll Bottom Chair (2016) that turns into a secretariat desk and Loop that transforms into two interlocking chairs when expanded (2015).

== In language ==
- If someone "nearly fell off their chair" after being informed about something, it was because they were very shocked or surprised.
- An orchestra awards the best player in a particular section a "chair" or "principal seat" based on ability. The first chair of the section plays the solos, and in string sections, determines the bowings. In professional orchestras, the first chair player receives higher pay. It is also common for this position to be known as "first stand" or "first desk", a reference to the portable lectern on which the musicians put their sheet music. However, the person who is first chair in the first violin section is usually referred to as the concertmaster in the US or leader in the UK.
- In academia, an endowed chair is a prestigious appointment for a professor, paid for by a dedicated funding source.
- A chair is the highest officer of an organized group, such as the chair of the board, the head of the Board of Directors in a company or non-profit organization.
- "Musical chairs" is a common party game and a colloquial expression to describe people shuffling from seat to seat, around different locations, or from one job title to another.
- In American slang, to say someone will "get the chair" is to say that they will be executed by an electric chair. Alternatively, it can be a metaphor for other harsh punishment.
- An armchair can be used as shorthand for undue comfort or domesticity, as with an armchair theorist or armchair general.

== See also ==
- List of chairs for an extended list of types, such as the lift chair, papasan chair, swivel chair.
- Chair pose
- Chair squat
- Riding-like sitting
- Right to sit
- Seating assignment
- Splat (furniture), the central vertical element of a wooden chair back
