= Stokke AS =

Norwegian children's furniture manufacturer

- Industry: Furniture
- Founded: Ålesund, Norway (1932)
- Headquarters: Ålesund, Norway
- Owner: NXMH (NXC)
- Number of employees: 81 (2026)
- Website: stokke.com

Stokke AS is a Norwegian manufacturer of children's furniture and accessories, founded by Georg Stokke in 1932. Stokke is known for producing the Tripp Trapp adjustable high chair, the best-selling item of furniture in Norway, developed by the Norwegian furniture designer Peter Opsvik and launched in 1972.

In cooperation with Hans Christian Mengshoel, Peter Opsvik also designed the original Balans kneeling chair, produced by Stokke, launched in 1979.

In the 1980s Stokke produced the iconic 'Ekstrem' lounge chair, designed by Terje Ekström in 1972.

Introduced in 1999, the Stokke Sleepi Crib was designed by Susanne Grønlund and Claus Hviid Knudsen.

In 2006, Stokke spun off its office furniture manufacturing to a new, independent company named Varier Furniture. Since then, Stokke has concentrated on its line of children's furniture and products.

In December 2013 it was announced that NXMH, the investment arm of the Korean holding NXC, was to buy the company from the Stokke family.

In 2021, Stokke acquired Babyzen and their YOYO baby stroller product line.

Stokke has grown to provide worldwide distribution through direct channels and retail partners in 50 countries.
