= Tripp Trapp =

Wooden high chair for children

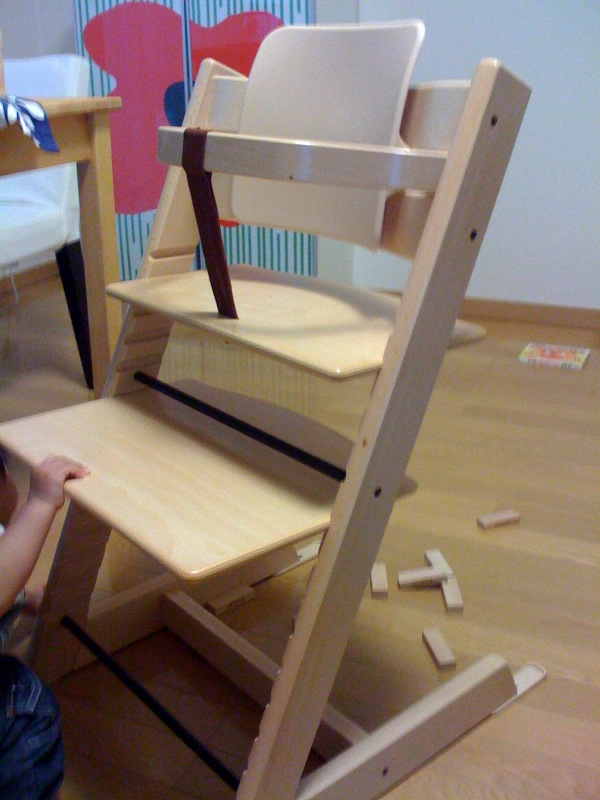
- Inventor: Peter Opsvik
- Inception: 1972
- Manufacturer: Stokke AS

Tripp Trapp (formerly known as KinderZeat in North America) is an adjustable wooden high chair for children. It was developed by the Norwegian furniture designer Peter Opsvik for the company Stokke AS. Launched in 1972, over time it became a best-selling item. Peter Opsvik is also the designer, in cooperation with Hans Christian Mengshoel, of the original Balans kneeling chair.

== Development history ==
Peter Opsvik noticed that his son Tor had no chair that could position him at the correct height at the family dinner table and enable him to participate with the rest of the family. He then developed a chair that was adjustable and changed with the size of his son as he grew bigger.

Tripp Trapp did not sell well in the beginning, but a news segment on Norwegian television in 1974 sparked an interest that has gained strength over the years. By 2016 Tripp Trapp had sold more than 10 million chairs.

== Product characteristics ==
Tripp Trapp was initially crafted as an ergonomic seating solution, featuring adjustable seat and foot plates to accommodate children from infancy to adulthood. Over time, supplementary accessories have been introduced to broaden its functionality, including provisions for newborns. Notably, consumers have the flexibility to purchase the chair and its accessories individually or as part of a comprehensive package. Among the favored additions are the Baby Set, Tripp Trapp Cushion, Tray, and Newborn Set, each enhancing the chair's versatility and comfort.

Additionally the chair is correctly spaced and so stable that even a young toddler can climb up into the chair safely by themselves. The Tripp Trapp high chair is made from beechwood with some limited editions in oak.
