= Kneeler (disambiguation) =

A kneeler is a piece of furniture used for resting in a kneeling position.

Kneeler may also refer to:

- Kneeling chair, recommended for certain diseases or injuries of the backbone
- Garden kneeler, a kneeler for use during gardening
- Kneeling bus, a type of commuter bus that lowers to admit passengers
- A motorcycle with a low center of gravity
