= Opsvik =

Opsvik is a Norwegian surname. Notable people with the surname include:

- Eivind Opsvik (born 1973), Norwegian jazz musician and composer
- Peter Opsvik (1939–2024), Norwegian industrial designer
