= Saddle chair =

A saddle chair uses the same principles in its design as an equestrian saddle. It is equipped with a chair base on casters and a gas cylinder for adjusting the correct sitting height. The casters enable moving around and reaching out for objects while sitting. Some saddle chairs have backrests, but most do not.

Riding-like sitting on a saddle chair differs from sitting on a conventional chair. Saddle chair users sit 20–30 cm higher, which puts the hips and the knees into a 135° angle, compared to the 90° angle typically associated with sitting on a traditional chair.

Because the saddle chair is higher than a normal office chair, the desk has to be higher as well. For this purpose there are desks that can be electronically or mechanically adjusted to fit the user. A saddle chair can also be used with a normal office desk, but then the desk has to be lifted up with height extension pieces.

The saddle chair seat is either solid or divided. A divided seat reduces pressure on the perineum and lowers the temperature in the genital area. A divided seat is thought to be healthier, especially for men, than a solid seat.

Some saddle chairs include not only height adjustments but also a tilt mechanism. There is also a divided saddle chair model on the market that has an adjustable gap between the two seat parts. Accessories, such as elbow and wrist supports, are available for saddle chairs to make different work tasks easier.

== Benefits and adjustments ==
A saddle chair can benefit men by decreasing the testicular temperature, and may help both men and women with lumbar support. Bloomberg Businessweek endorsed the saddle chair, noting while there is no medical evidence it helps increase sperm production, it "tips your pelvis and spine into the right position and un-squishes your genitals.

Adapting to a saddle chair takes time and requires a new kind of attitude towards sitting. The most common reason for using a saddle chair is that the users feel it is healthier for the back and legs than a standard chair. An intervention study on schoolchildren found that initially saddle chairs were liked better, but the difference leveled off over time.

== See also ==
- Riding-like sitting
- Sitting
- Ergonomics
