= Papasan chair =

Type of bowl-shaped chair

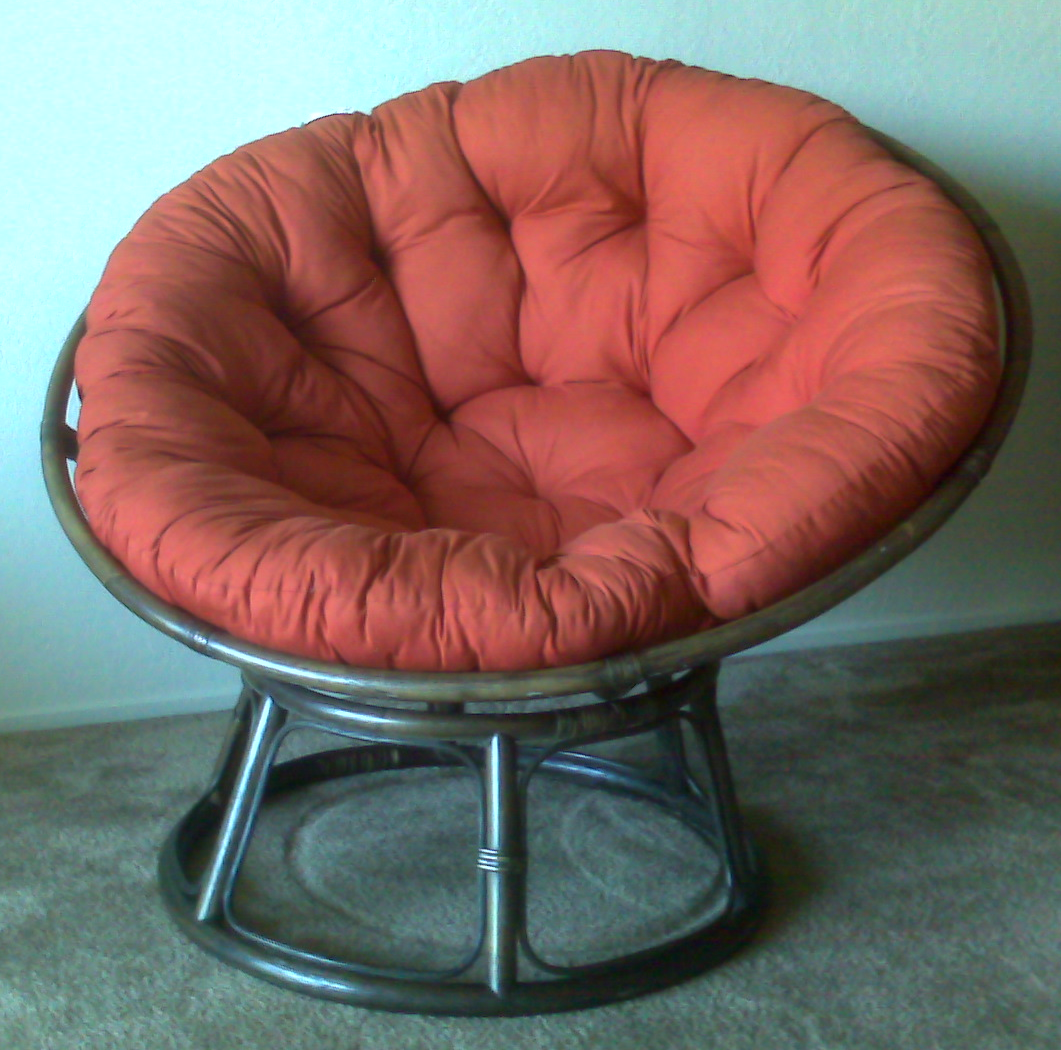
A papasan chair

A papasan chair (also called a bowl chair or oval chair) is a type of bowl-shaped chair.

== Design ==
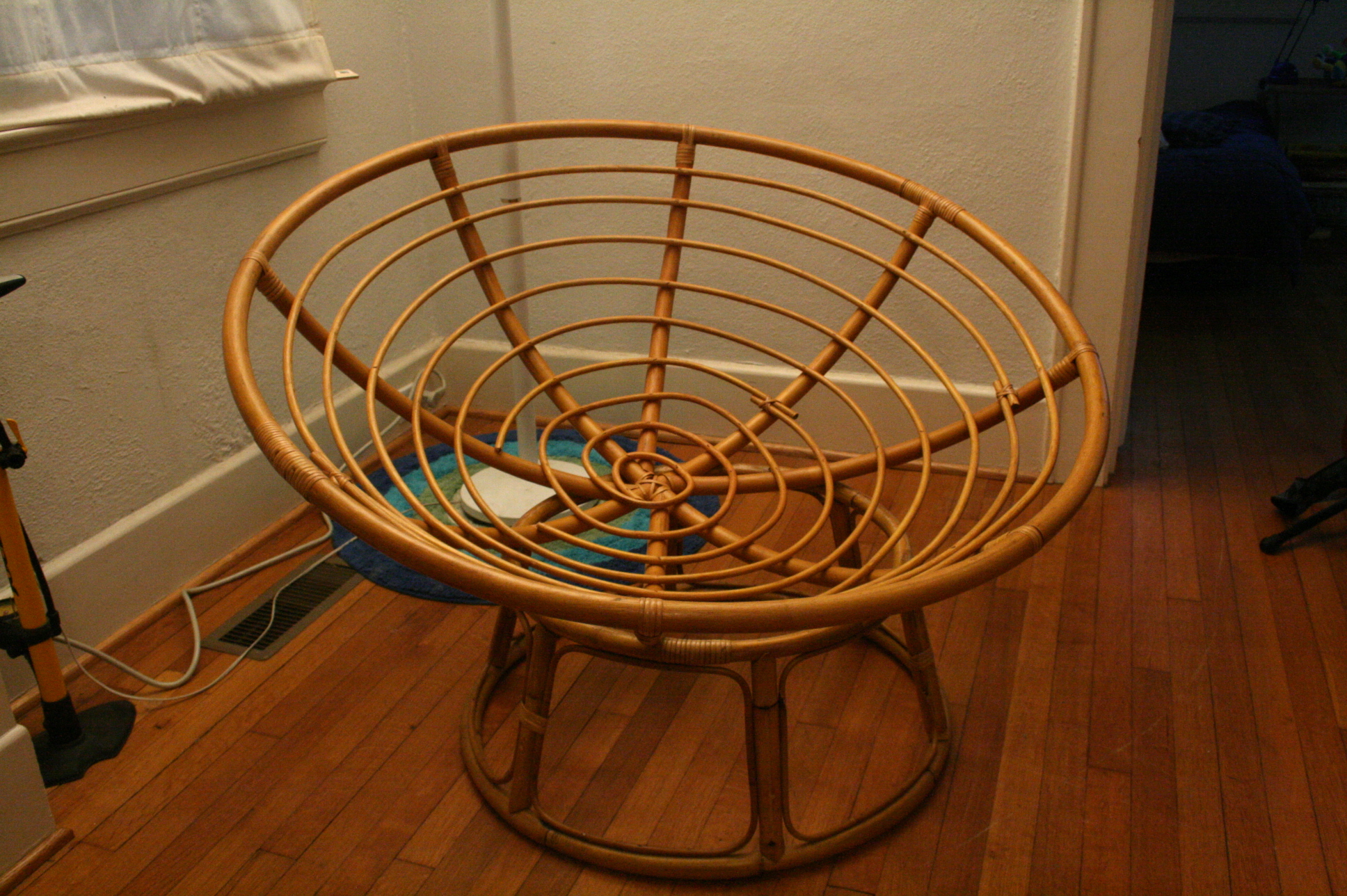
A papasan chair with its cushion removed

A papasan chair is a large rounded bowl-shaped chair with an adjustable angle. The bowl rests in an upright frame traditionally made of rattan, but also sometimes made of sturdy wicker or wood.

The base frame often has rings of two different diameters. Assembly instructions are inconsistent about whether the larger ring should be on top, so as to hold more of the bowl, or should instead make contact with the floor. Some bases come with footpads attached to the larger ring.

The cushion of the chair is typically thick velveteen material filled with cotton fluff similar to that of a futon. In traditional papasans, the cushion can be removed and used outside of the sturdy frame.

Papasan chairs are typically 35 to 45 in (89 to 114 cm) inches wide and 30 to 36 in (76 to 91 cm) deep, with a seat height of 14 to 18 in (36 to 46 cm) from the floor.

== History ==
The papasan chair gained popularity in the west when American World War II veterans brought them home from Asia. During the 1960s, the chairs became a favorite among college students due to their low price and unconventionality. The chair was introduced by Pier 1 Imports in 1975 and soon became one of the retailer's iconic products. Towards the end of the twentieth century, the papasan had become a common piece of furniture in American homes.

== Variations ==
The mamasan (or double papasan) chair is a two-seated version, and was introduced to the western world in the 1950s. Prior to that, it was in use in far eastern Asia, particularly in Indonesia, Thailand, and Japan.
