= Riding-like sitting =

Sitting posture

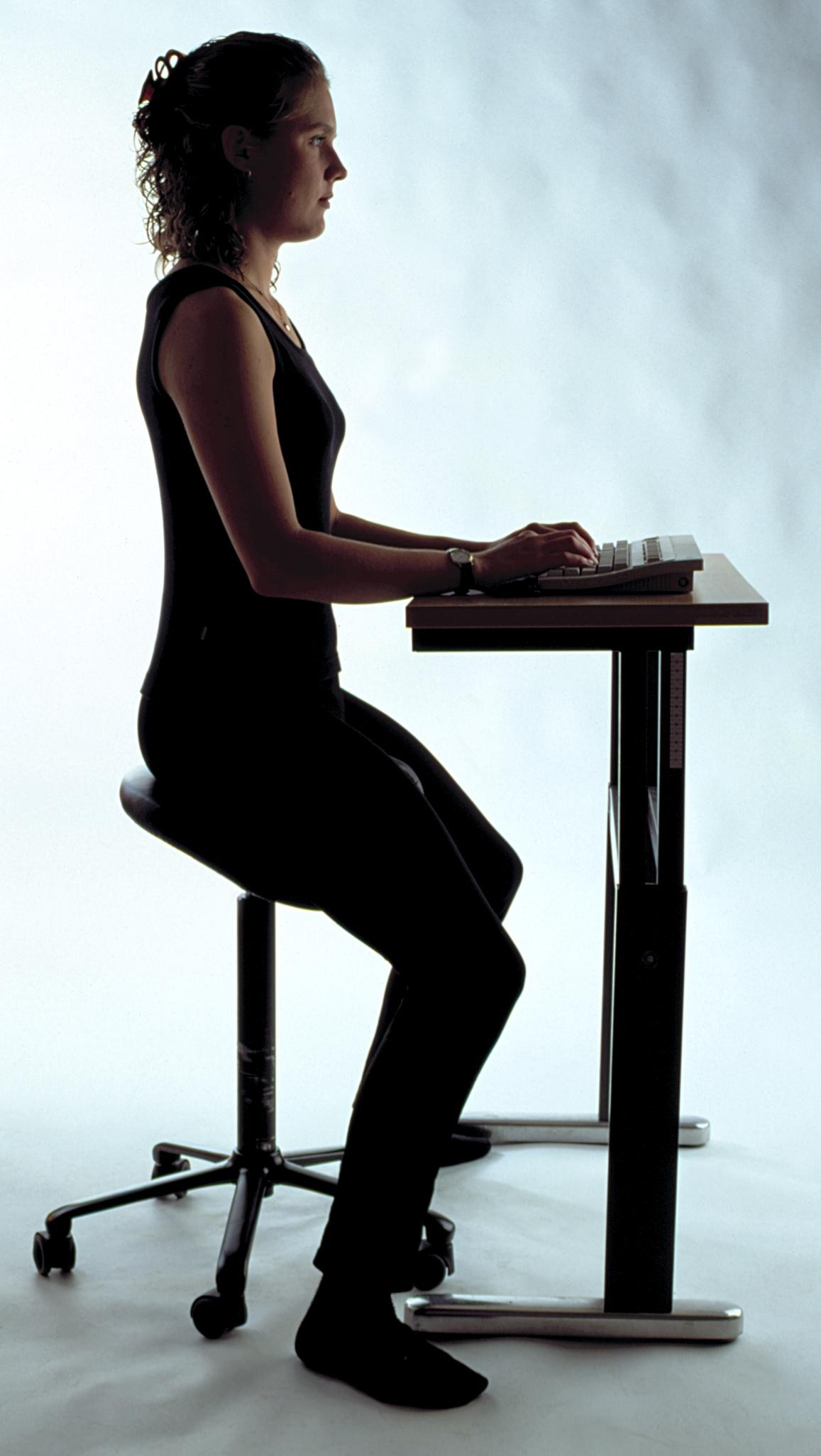
Riding-like sitting

Riding-like sitting or balanced sitting includes a sitting posture that approaches the natural resting position. A forward-sloping seat encourages this natural posture, which is the same as when lying on the side while sleeping. The lumbar curve is preserved, the joint angles are open, and the muscles are well-balanced and relaxed. This position is exactly the same as when riding a horse: the rider sits upright and at the same time maintains a lumbar lordosis because of the downwards-sloping thighs.

Riding-like sitting or balanced seating is the most suitable position for long periods of sitting. Forward-sloping seats and higher desks can eliminate lower back strain and even prevent chronic back pain. It also relieves pressure on the lungs and stomach and provides greater mobility. The advantages compared to conventional furniture in terms of pain, flexion, and comfort are documented in several scientific studies starting with research by A C Mandal, MD, and recently reviewed, updated, and discussed by T Mandal with several references to research and the revised European (CEN) standards for educational furniture that includes balanced seating options.

A sloping seat increases the load sustained by the lower limbs in order to prevent the body from sliding off the chair.

== See also ==
- Ergonomics
- Partial squat
- Right to sit
