= Dental engine =

Dental care appliance

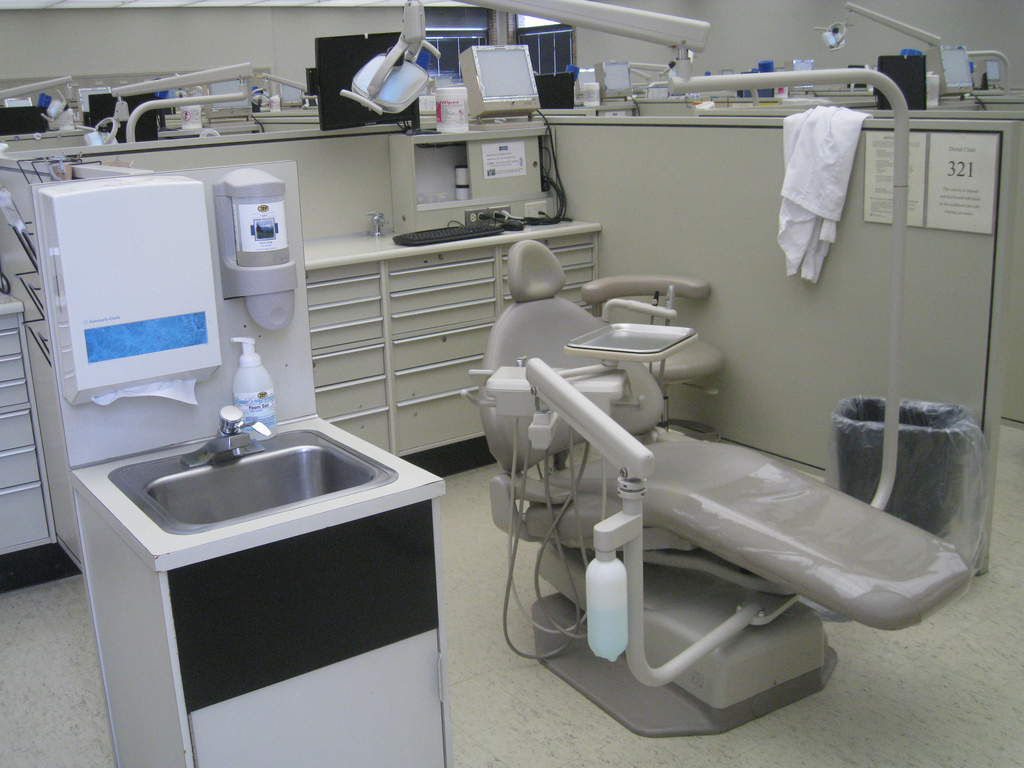
Dental chair integrated with a dental engine

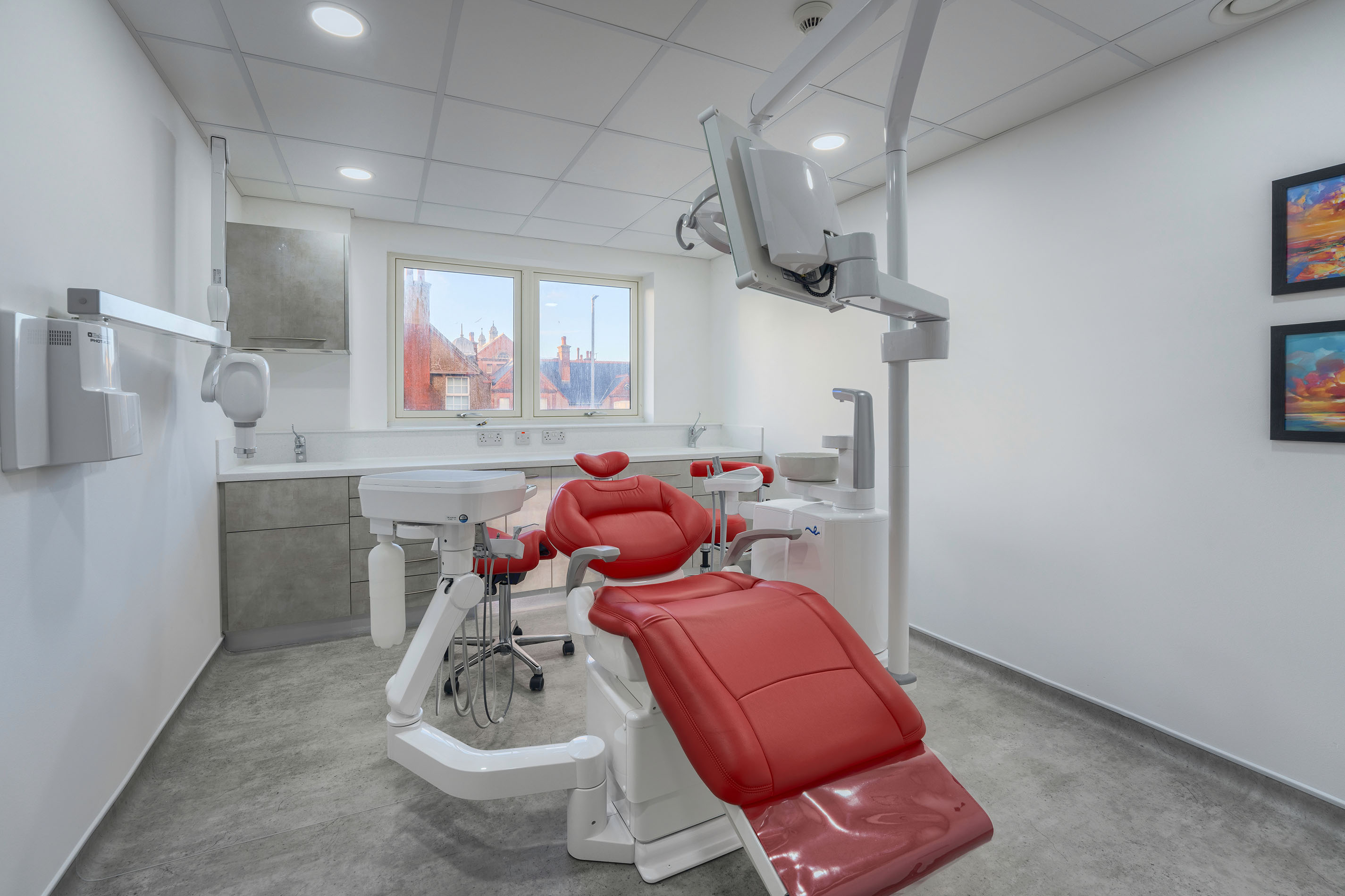
Kneebreak dental chair

A dental engine is a large chair-side appliance (often including the dental chair itself) for use in a dentist's office.

American dentist Josiah Flagg created the first adjustable dental chair in the late 18th century, adapting a wooden chair by adding an instrument tray on one side, as well as a movable headrest. This equipment was continually improved, and in the 20th century became an integrated treatment unit, incorporating air, water, gas, and electricity into one piece of equipment.

At this point, patients were treated sitting, with dentists standing. In 1958 John Naughton created a chair with an articulated seat and back, which marked the introduction of what is called "four-handed dentistry".

At minimum, a dental chair serves as a source of mechanical or pneumatic power for one or more handpieces.

Typically, it will also include a small faucet and a spit-sink, which the patient can use for rinsing, as well as one or more suction hoses, and a compressed air/irrigation water nozzle for blowing or washing debris clear of the work area in the patient's mouth.

The equipment possibly includes an ultrasonic cleaning appliance, as well as a small table to hold the instrument tray, a operating light, and possibly a computer monitor or display.

LED operating lights have transformed the user experience in recent years providing a 'cool' light, with a bulb that doesn't need changing and which floods the oral cavity with a light distribution that reduces shadows, and in turn eye strain. A light with a high color rendering index accurately reflects colour for soft and hard tissue diagnosis; some lights also have a useful composite mode, which illuminates without curing photo-initiated resins.

Due to their design and use, dental chairs are a potential source of infection from several kinds of bacteria, including Legionella pneumophila.

== Gallery ==
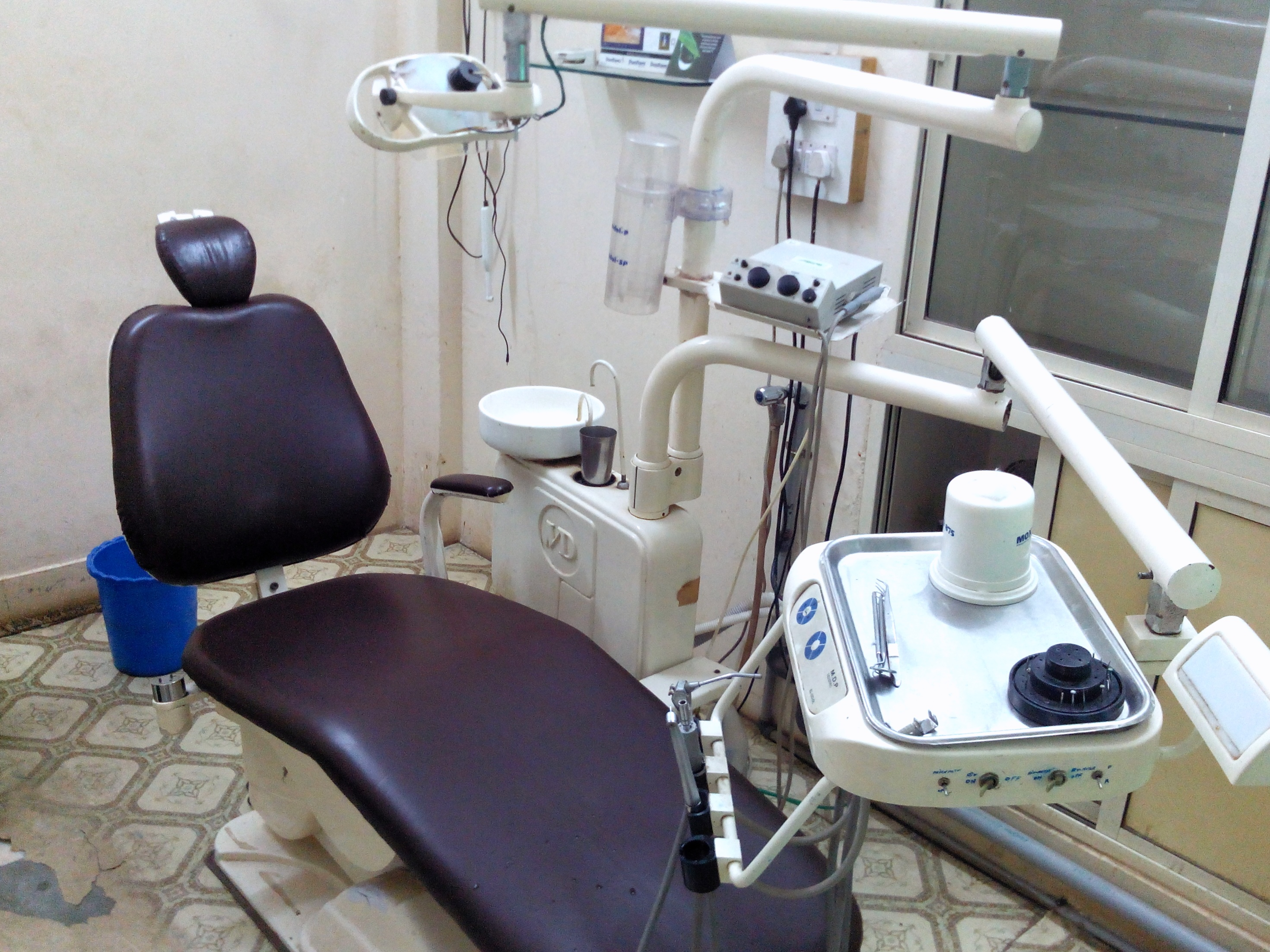
Close view of dental chair with various visible parts

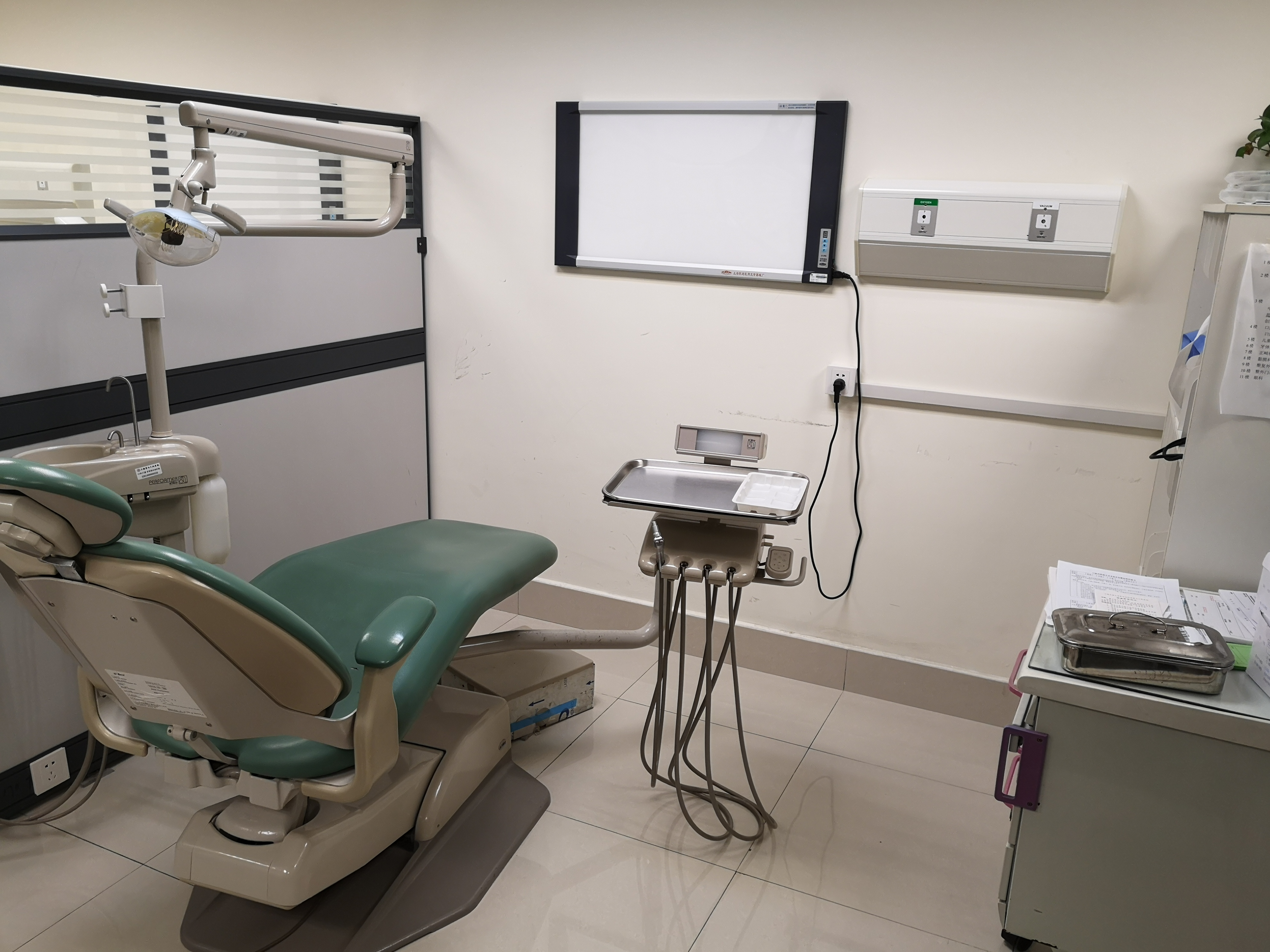
Hospital dental treatment area

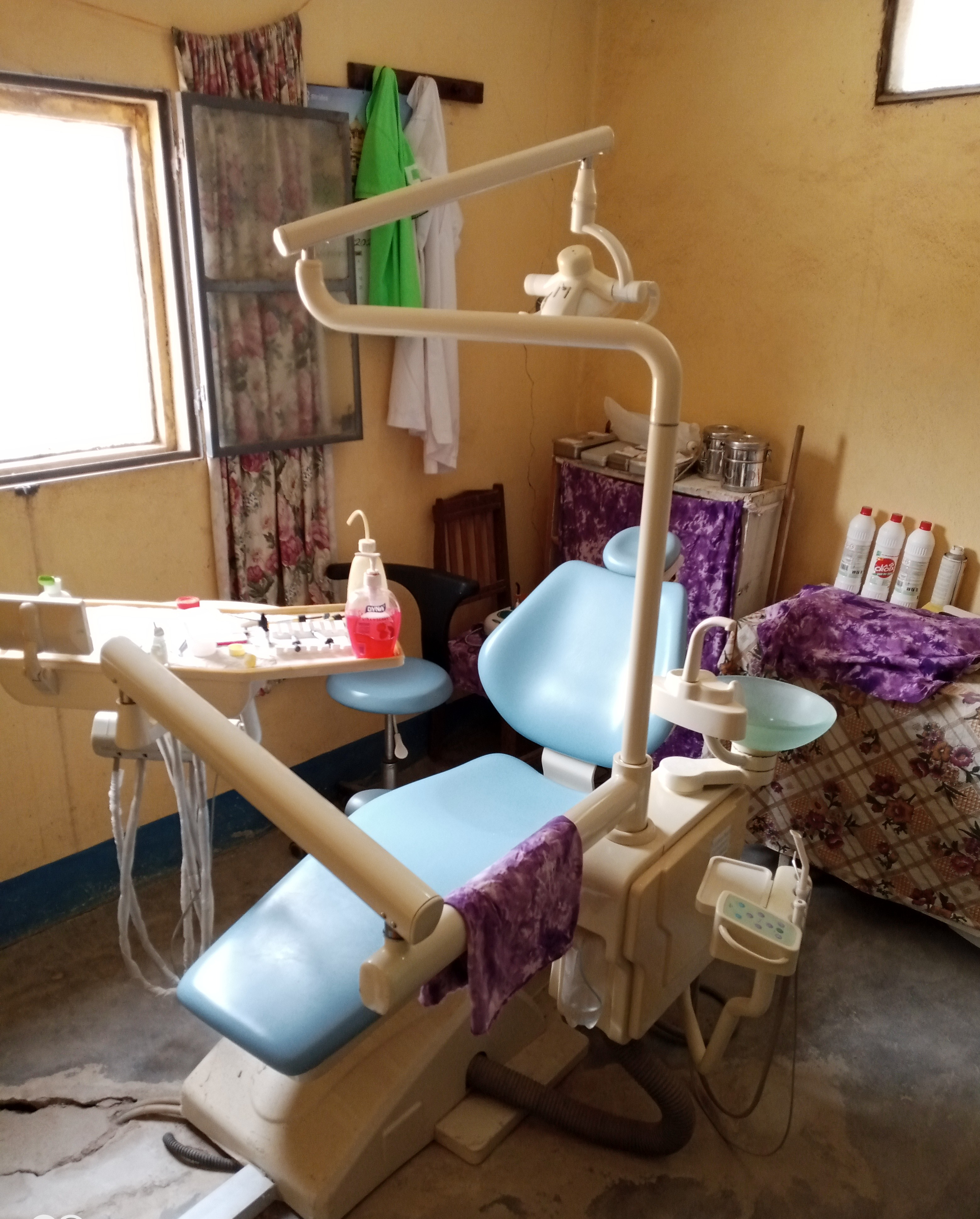
Dental engine in North Cameroon
