= Peter Opsvik =

Norwegian industrial designer (1939–2024)

- Born: Peter Opsvik; 25 March 1939; Stranda Municipality, Norway
- Died: 30 September 2024 (aged 85)
- Years active: 1965–2024
- Known for: Tripp Trapp, Nomi high chair, Capisco the saddle chair, Credo, H05, different Balans chairs
- Website: Opsvik.no

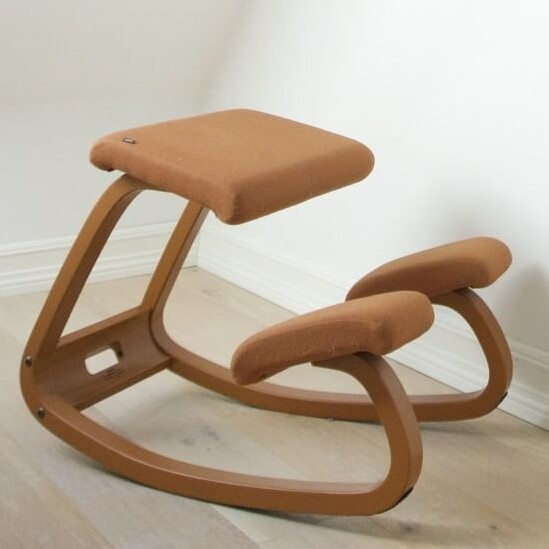
Balans Chair designed by Peter Opsvik (1979)

Peter Opsvik (25 March 1939 – 30 September 2024) was a Norwegian industrial designer best known for his innovative and ergonomic chairs, and the father of Jazz bass player Eivind Opsvik. Opsvik's furniture can be found under the brand names: Rybo (Garden), Nomi High Chair, Håg (Capisco, H04, H05, Conventio Wing), Varier (Balans), Stokke (Tripp Trapp) Naturellement (Reflex), Cylindra (Furniture objects) and Moment (Globe). His book Rethinking Sitting came out in 2009 giving insight into his thinking about sitting and explaining the philosophy behind his chairs. Peter Opsvik was also a jazz musician. He was a member of Christiania Jazz band from 1972 and the band Christiania 12 from 1993.

Opsvik died on 30 September 2024, at the age of 85.

== Essential concepts ==
His probably best known work is the adjustable Tripp Trapp (1972) chair for children, the first chair that "grows" with the child from toddler to teenager. It is manufactured by the company Stokke and has sold in more than seven million copies. In 2013, together with Evomove.com, he launched the Nomi high chair concept. His first chair was the Inka Star (also known as Oasis) by Stokke, launched in the late 1960s.

The saddle chair Håg Capisco was launched in the 1980s and inspired by the horseback rider's dynamic posture. The goal, however, was to create a sitting device or work chair that would invite the user to assume the greatest number of sitting postures possible. In 2010 this design classic was made accessible for a wider audience when the Capisco Puls was launched.

A balancing tilt is highly advantageous since the user automatically controls the tilting movements of the chair without having to think about it. The user can concentrate on his/her activities and does not have to bother with mechanical regulation of the chair. The chair follows the natural inclinations of the body and automatically stabilises at the body's selected sitting angles or at the angles that are required by the work task being done. The simplest way of verifying this is to try out one of his chairs in front of a work table during a normal working day. The chair tilts forward when the user wants to be active at the table and tilts backwards if the user wants to relax or talk on the telephone. Often such variations occur many times per minute.

Hans Chr. Mengshoel initiated the concept of kneeling chair posture in Norway, and Peter Opsvik was one of three designers who developed chairs based on this principle that all had Balans in their names. The others were Oddvin Rykken, and prof. Svein Gusrud. Peter Opsvik's kneeling chairs were originally manufactured by Stokke (now Varier), Håg and Rybo. This chair has been voted one of 50 designs that changed the world.

As the name Variable indicates, it was of primary importance for Opsvik that the kneeling posture should be one of many different sitting postures.

Product examples are Variable Balans, Gravity Balans, Thatsit Balans, and Wing Balans.

== Awards ==
Peter Opsvik was awarded a number of prizes for his work, including the European Commissions "Product Safety Award 2019" for Nomi Highchair. Red Dot Award 2013 "Best of Best" for Nomi High chair, Red Dot award 2011 (for Capisco Puls), the IF Product Design gold award 2011 (for Capisco Puls) and the Norwegian Design of Excellence award 2011. Opsvik was awarded The classic award for design excellence in Norway for the chairs Tripp Trapp in 1996 and Håg Capisco. In 2008 he was awarded Anders Jahre's cultural award and the Nordic Design Award (Nordiska Designpriset). Opsvik has also received Torsten & Wanjas Söderbergs design award in Sweden for his pioneering, movable and variable furniture. In 2013 Norsk Form (The Foundation for Design and Architecture in Norway) awarded Opsvik Jacob-prisen for 2012. Opsvik won a Compasso d'Oro Career Award in 2022.

== Exhibitions ==
Peter Opsvik's furniture-objects have been exhibited around the world. Movement Peter Opsvik, a travelling exhibition initiated by the Norwegian Foreign Affairs, was exhibited at the Museum of Decorative Arts and Design (Gent) in 1999, Deutsches Museum (Munich), The Lighthouse (Glasgow) as well as others such as the Design Museum in London, and the Museum of Decorative Art and Design (Gothenburg). His Tripp Trapp Chair is held in the collection of the Museum of Modern Art (MoMA) in New York.

Some of his other exhibitions have been shown at:

- The West Norway Museum of Applied Art, Bergen 1996
- Kunstlerhaus (Artisthouse) mit Galerie, Göttingen 1990
- Gallerie V.I.A, Paris 1990
- Applied Art Museum, Oslo 1986
- New York, Houston, Chicago and Tokyo in 1982
- Wien, Düsseldorf, Den Haag and London in 1981
- Copenhagen and London 1979
