= Popliteal height =

For someone seated, the popliteal height is the distance from the underside of the foot to the underside of the thigh at the knees. It is sometimes called the "stool height". (The term "sitting height" is reserved for the height to the top of the head when seated.)
