= Kneeling chair =

Recommended for certain diseases or injuries of the backbone

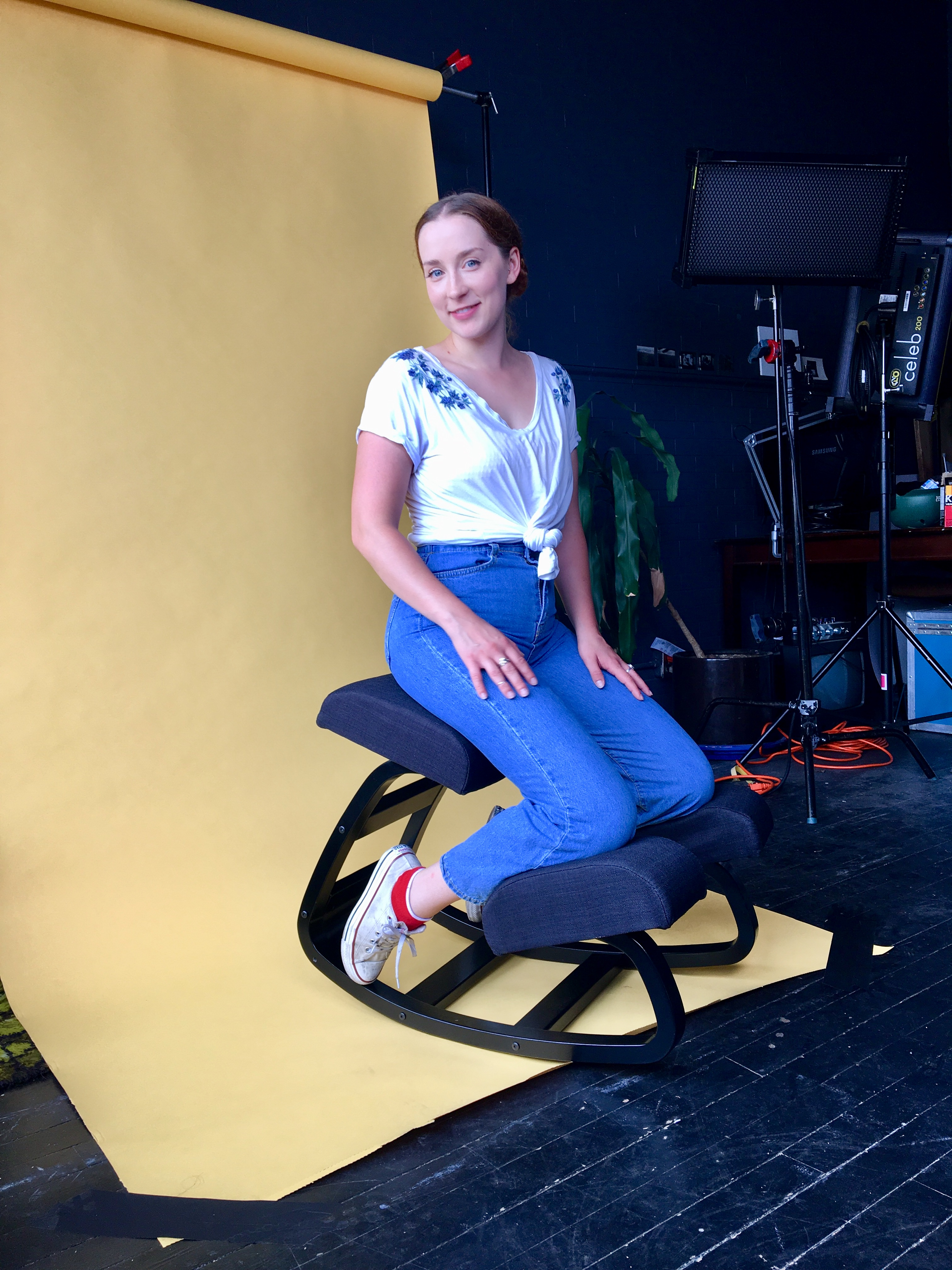
A woman on a rocking kneeling chair

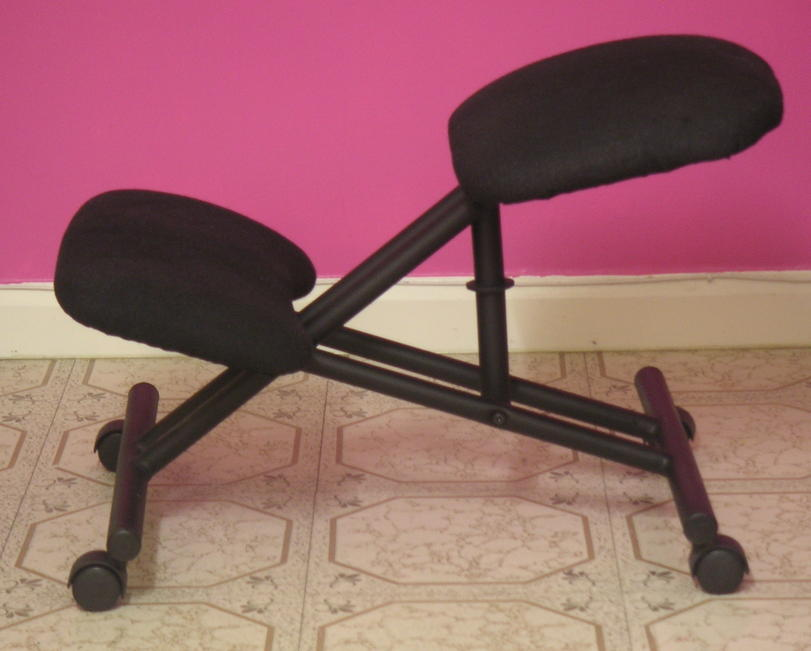
Kneeling chair. These chairs were the first piece of furniture designed to use with computers, and were called computer chairs. They were intended to help avoid the back problems associated with sitting in a constant hunched over condition. They usually had a rocker base, so that you could adjust your position by leaning slightly forward or back.

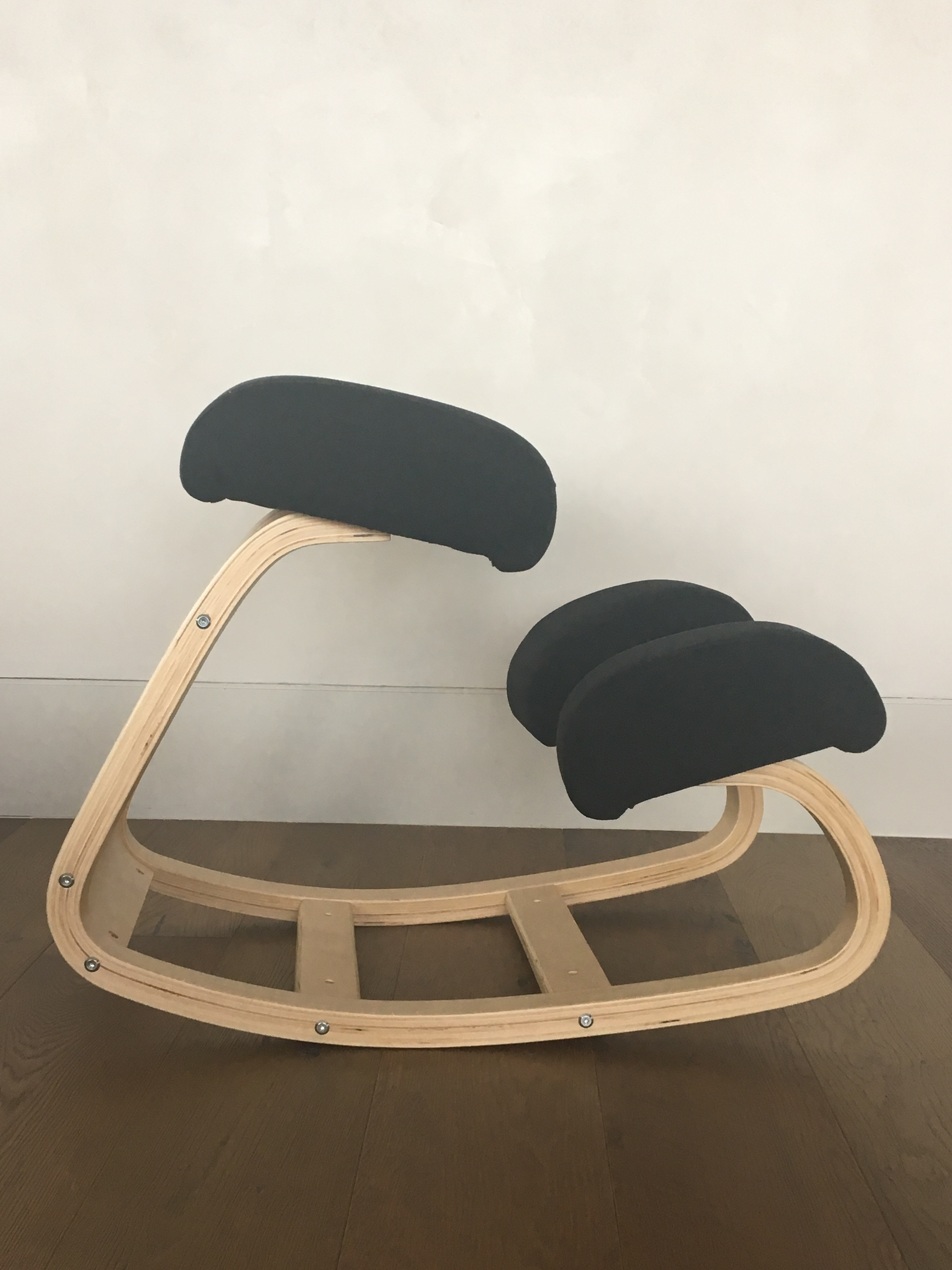
Kneeling chair with a rocker base

A kneeling chair is a type of chair for sitting in a position with the thighs dropped to an angle of about 60° to 70° from vertical (as opposed to 90° when sitting in a normal chair), with some of the body's weight supported by the shins.

== History ==
In 1979, Hans Christian Mengshoel invented the original kneeling chair of modern times, the Balans chair. Three Norwegian designers, Oddvin Rykken, Peter Opsvik, and Svein Gusrud developed chairs based on the same principle.

== Purpose ==
The kneeling chair is meant to reduce lower back strain by dividing the burden of one's weight between the shins and the buttocks. People with coccyx or tailbone pain resulting from significant numbers of hours in a sitting position (e.g., office desk jobs) are common candidates for such chairs.

A proper kneeling chair creates the open body angle by lowering the angle of the lower body, keeping the spine in alignment and the sitter properly positioned to task. The benefit of this position is that if one leans inward, the body angle remains 90° or wider. A misconception regarding kneeling chairs is that the body's weight bears on the knees, and thus users with poor knees cannot use the chair. In a proper kneeling chair, most of the weight remains on the buttocks, and some of the weight bears on the shins, not the knees. The primary function of the shin rests (knee rests) is to keep one from falling forward out of the chair.

A saddle chair provides another way to keep the body from falling forward; this type of seat is generally seen in some sit stand stools, which seek to emulate the straddle riding or saddle position of a horseback rider.

== Academic studies ==
Conclusions from scientific work on the possible benefits of the kneeling position point in different directions.

A. C. Mandal's research from the 1960s to the 1990s concluded that a forward sloping seat did effectively tip the pelvis forward, opening up the angle between torso and thigh, and thereby correctly aligns the spine, indicating a more suitable position for long periods of sitting.

Drury and Francher studied the original Balans kneeling chair in 1985, concluding that overall it was "no better than conventional chairs and could be worse than well-designed conventional office chairs".

Lander, et al. conducted another experiment in 1987 comparing the kneeling chair with a conventional chair, finding support for claims of increased blood circulation.

A 1989 study on a sample of 20 subjects concluded that the Balans chair promoted greater lumbar curvature than the "straight back chair" during relaxed sitting, typing, and writing, and that it be helpful in treatment of lower back injuries.

A 2008 study confirms that "ergonomically designed kneeling chairs set at +20° inclination do maintain standing lumbar curvature to a greater extent than sitting on a standard computer chair".
