= Camping chair =

Lightweight folding chair

An animation gif of a typical camping chair

A camping chair, or camp chair, is a lightweight folding chair with a canvas seat and backrest, which is suitable for use in temporary quarters, typically outdoor setting like camping on holiday, by being portable and easy to set up.

A camping stool is similar to a camping chair, but lacks back support.

== Gallery ==
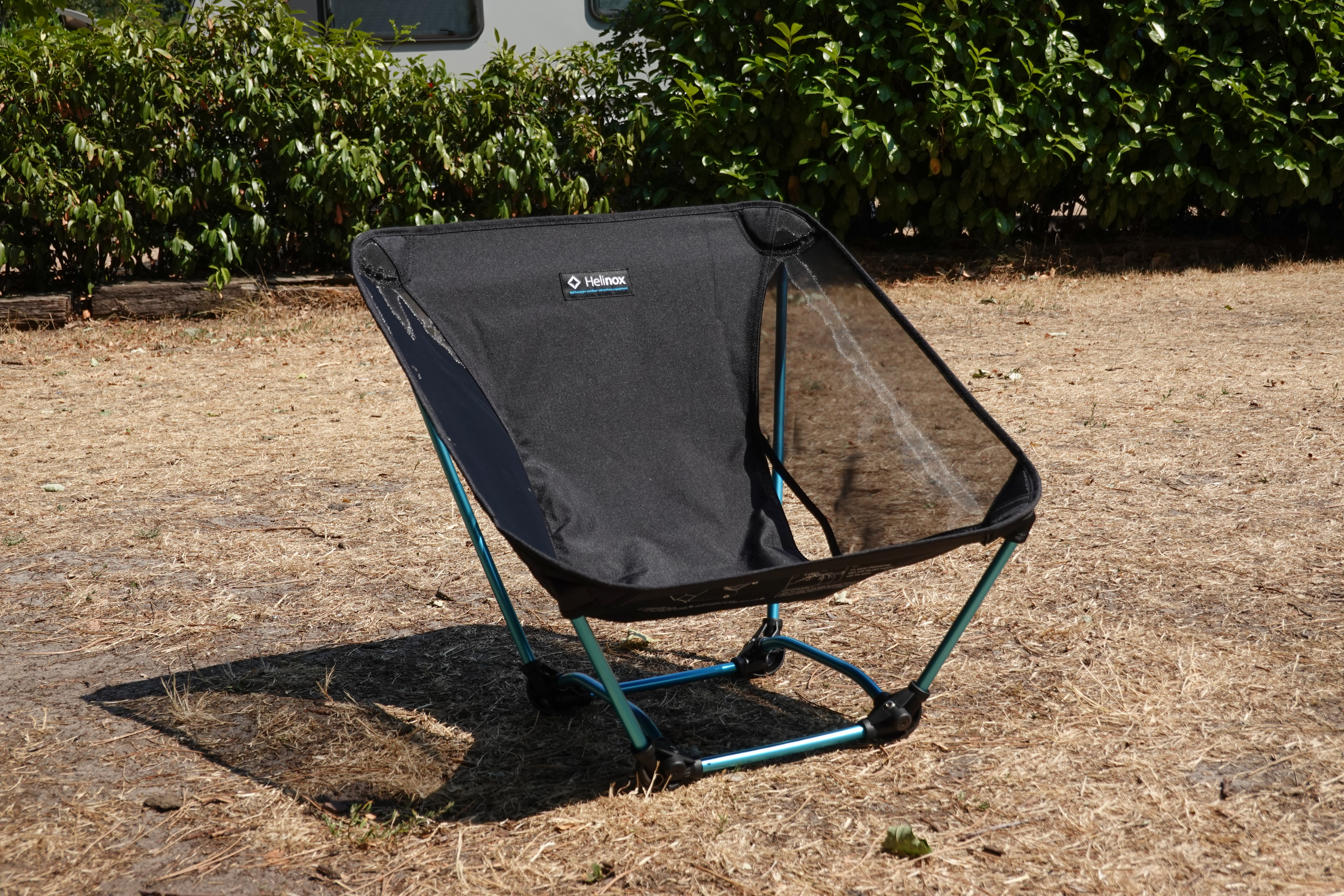
Low type of camping chair

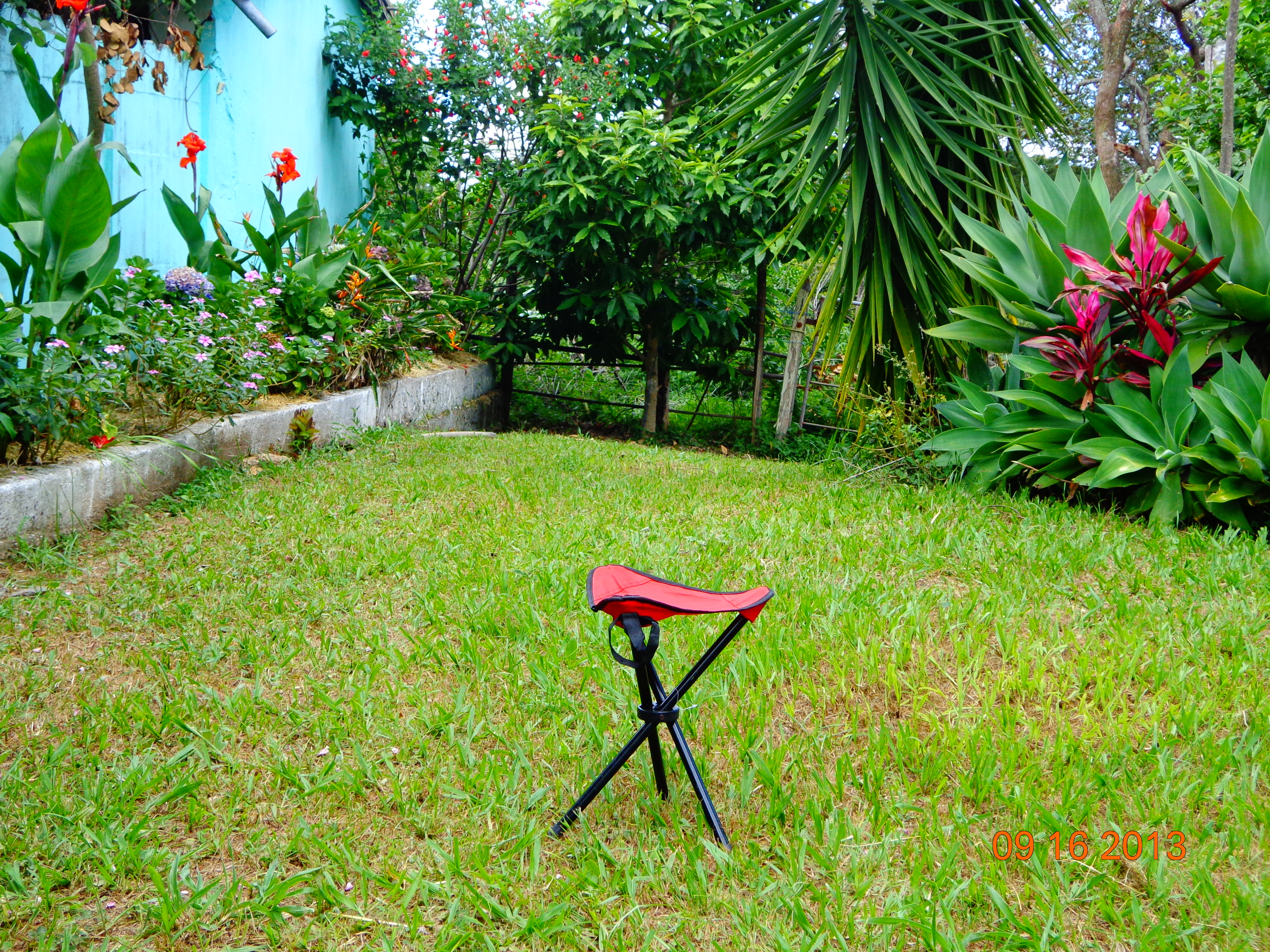
Three-legged folding camping stool, may be suited for uneven terrain

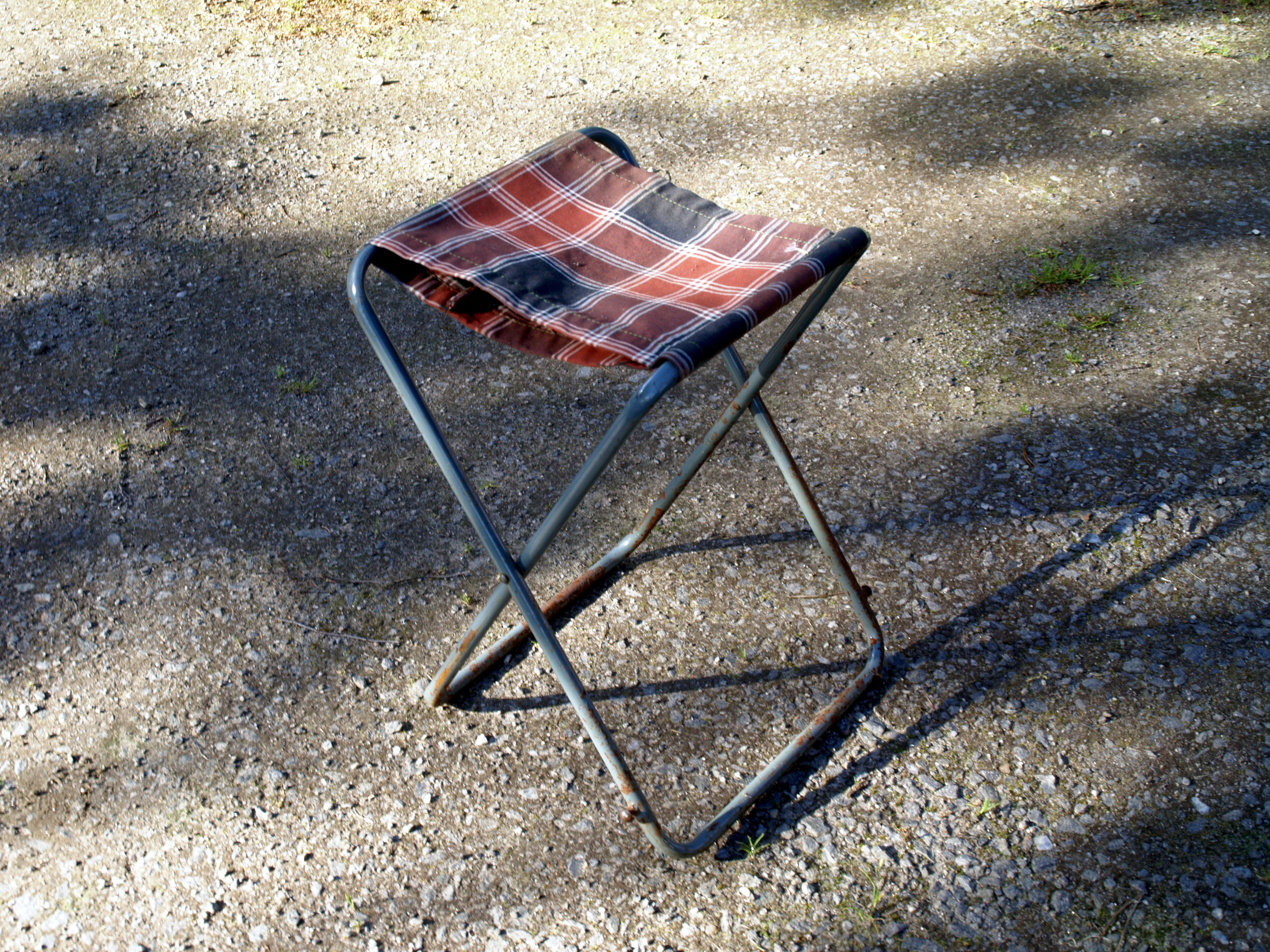
Folding camping stool

== See also ==
- List of chairs
- Deckchair
- Backpack chair, a combination of a backpack and a chair, sometimes used for camping, hiking or short hunting trips
- Camp bed also used in rustic situations
