= Backpack chair =

Combination of camping chair and backpack

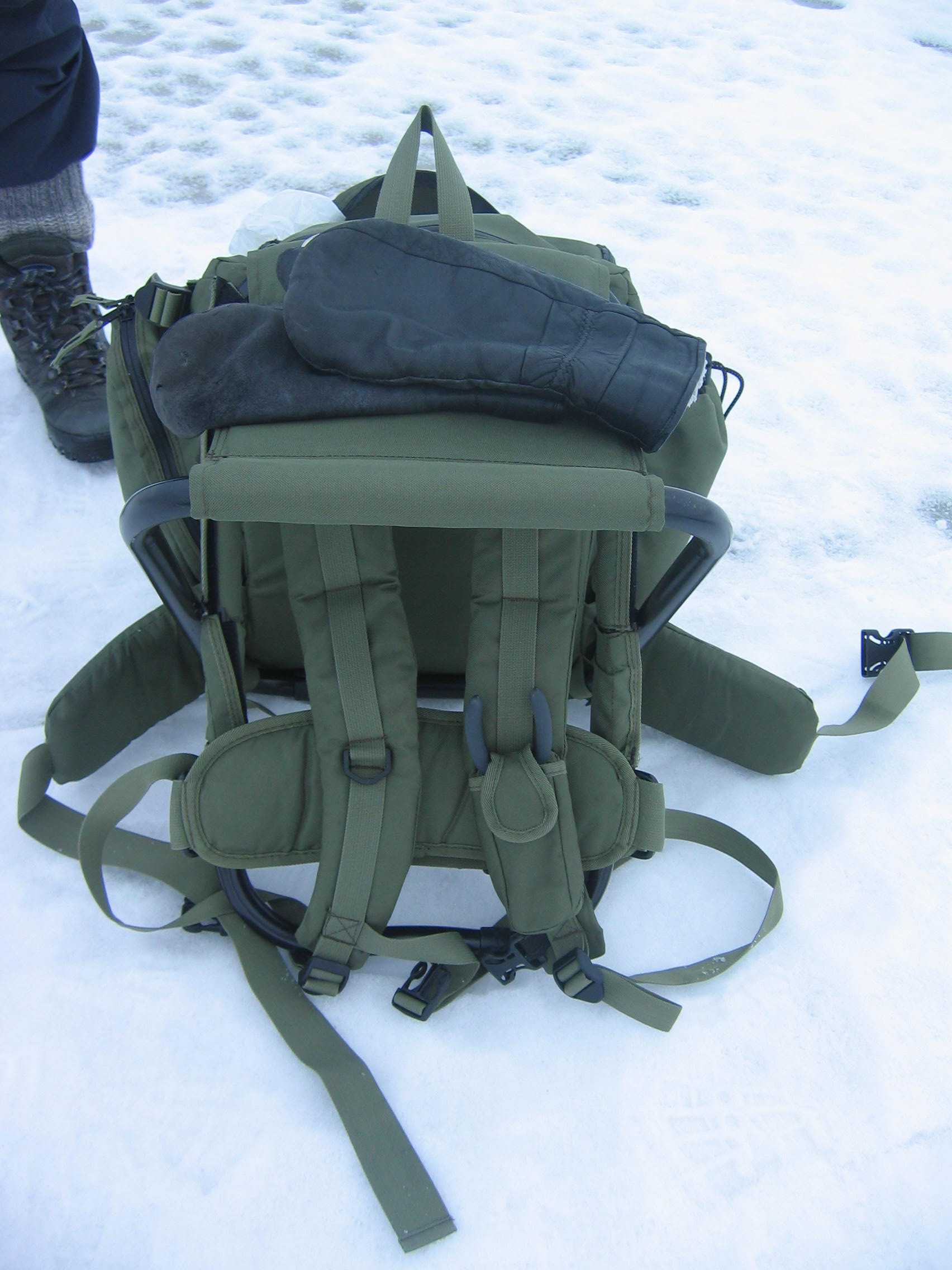
A green backpack chair without a backrest (which actually makes it a stool)

A backpack chair is a combination of a camping chair and a backpack. They are sometimes used for day trips, camping, fishing or hunting, especially for stand hunting where the hunter waits for long periods. They typically have a volume in line with a large daypack, for example around 25-40 liters, so that they can carry necessary equipment, but are often not designed to be able to comfortably carry very heavy loads (such as for example carrying meat). Backpack chairs often have a frame constructed from aluminum or steel tubes.

Two important parameters for a backpack chair are carrying and seating comfort, and there are many different designs and constructions with different compromises aiming to achieve both good carrying and seating comfort. Another important parameter in regard to hunting is seating height (for example 25–40 cm), and which height is appropriate can vary on the basis of a person's height, the type of hunting and whether the hunter intends to shoot from a seated position. Furthermore, a chair for hunting should preferably not squeak or make noise when sitting or walking.

Several patents on backpack chairs have been granted.

== See also ==
- Multifunctional furniture
- List of chairs
