= Folding chair =

Portable chair

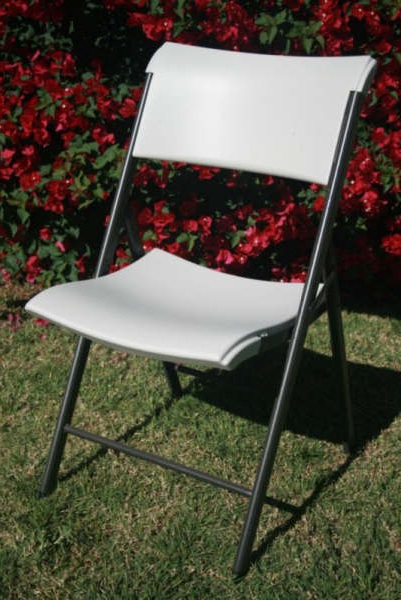
A typical modern folding chair

A folding chair is a type of folding furniture, a light, portable chair that folds flat or to a smaller size.

Many modern styles of folding chairs can be stored in a stack, in a row, or on a cart. They also may be combined or seen with a folding table.

== Uses ==
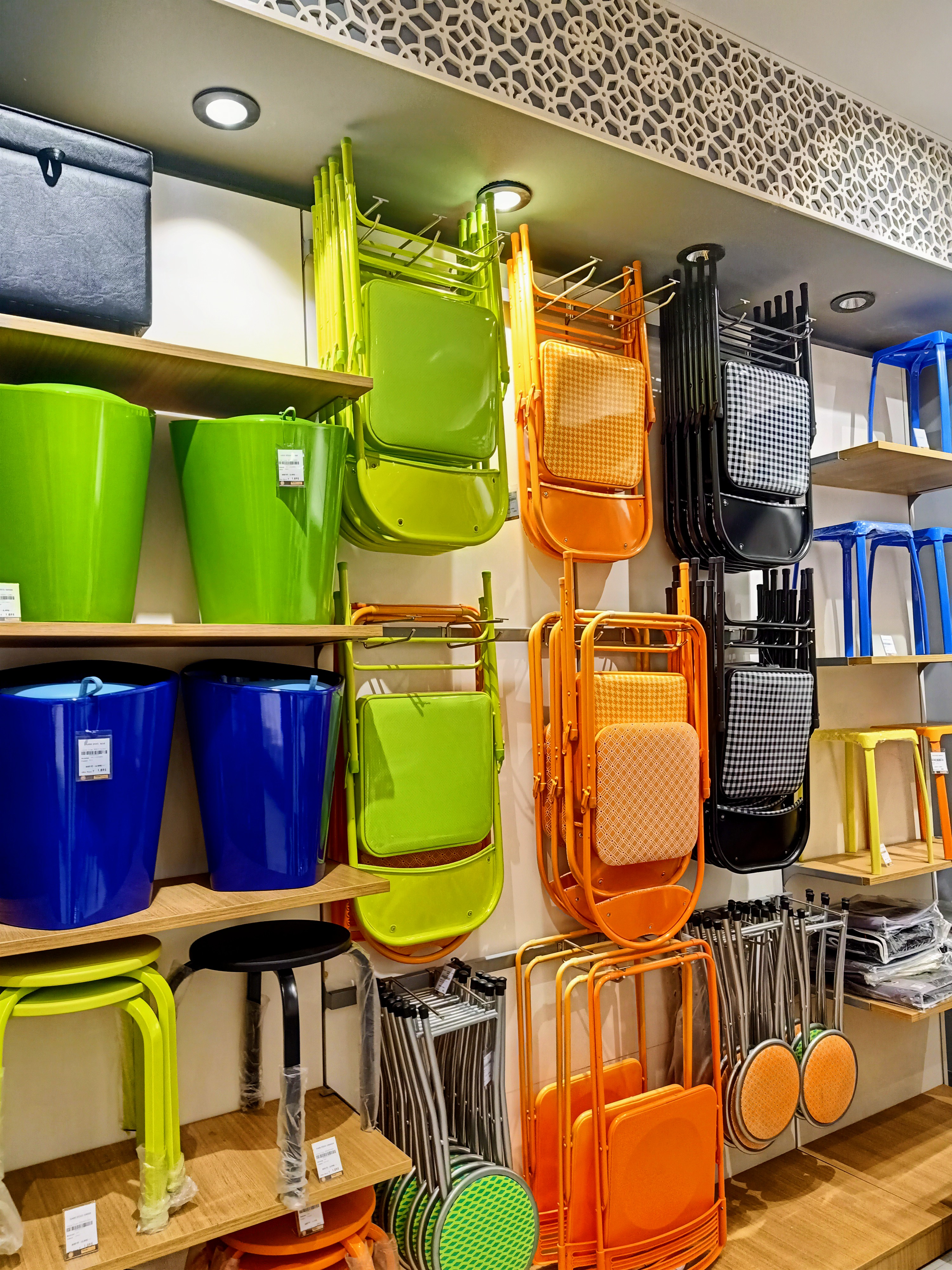
Folding chairs folded flat in a sales display

Folding chairs are generally used for seating in areas where permanent seating is not possible or practical. This includes outdoor and indoor events such as funerals, college graduations, religious services, and sporting events and competitions.

Folding chairs are used in the home for any situation requiring extra seating. This includes parties, card games, and temporary seating at the dinner table. It can be combined with a folding table.

Historically, folding chairs often were associated with providing an elevated seat for a high-status person among gatherings of folks sitting on the ground. Therefore, they often became a symbol for high-status.

== History ==
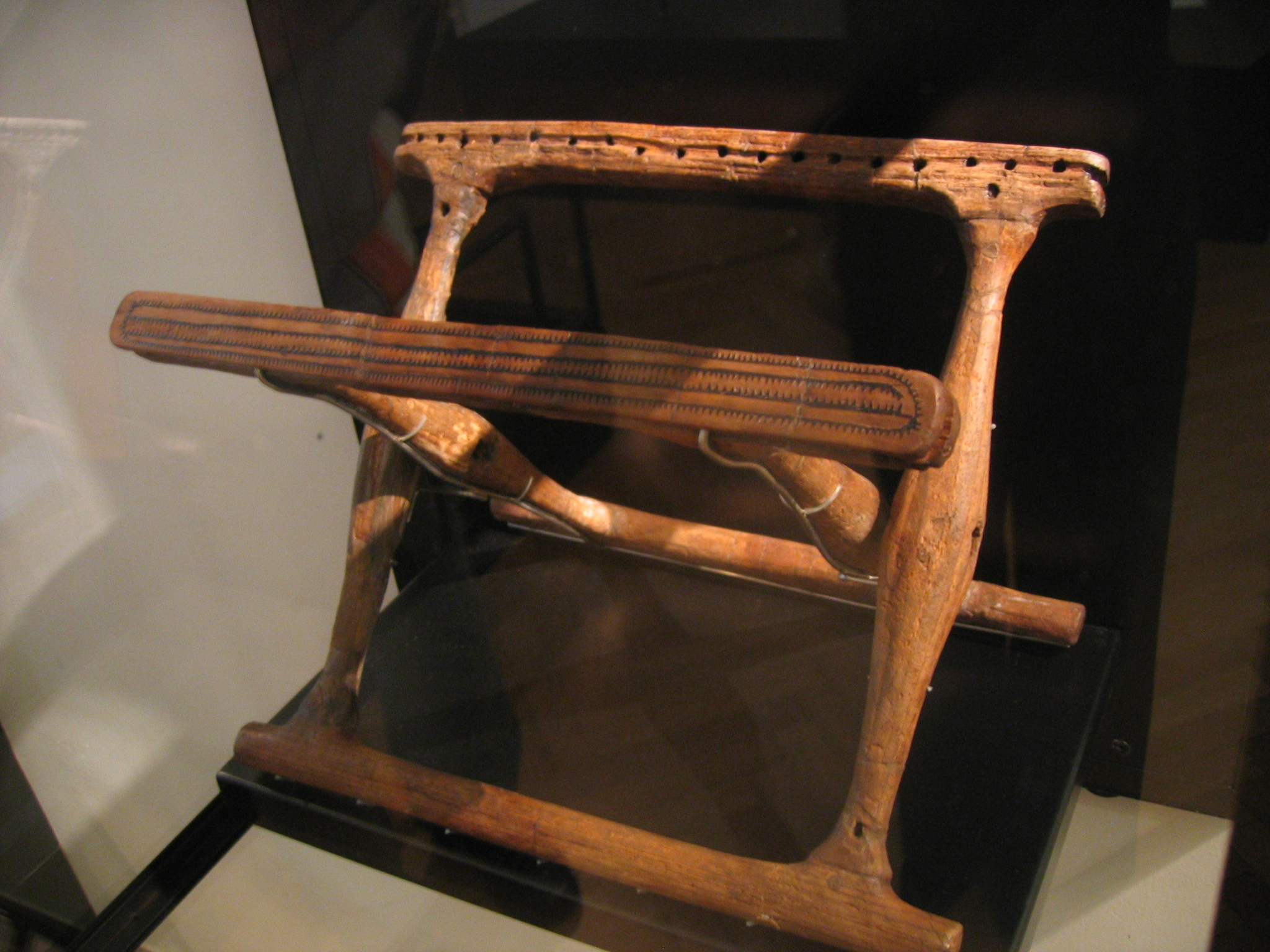
Frame of the ancient folding chair of Guldhøj, Denmark (Nordic Bronze Age, second half of fourteenth century BC)

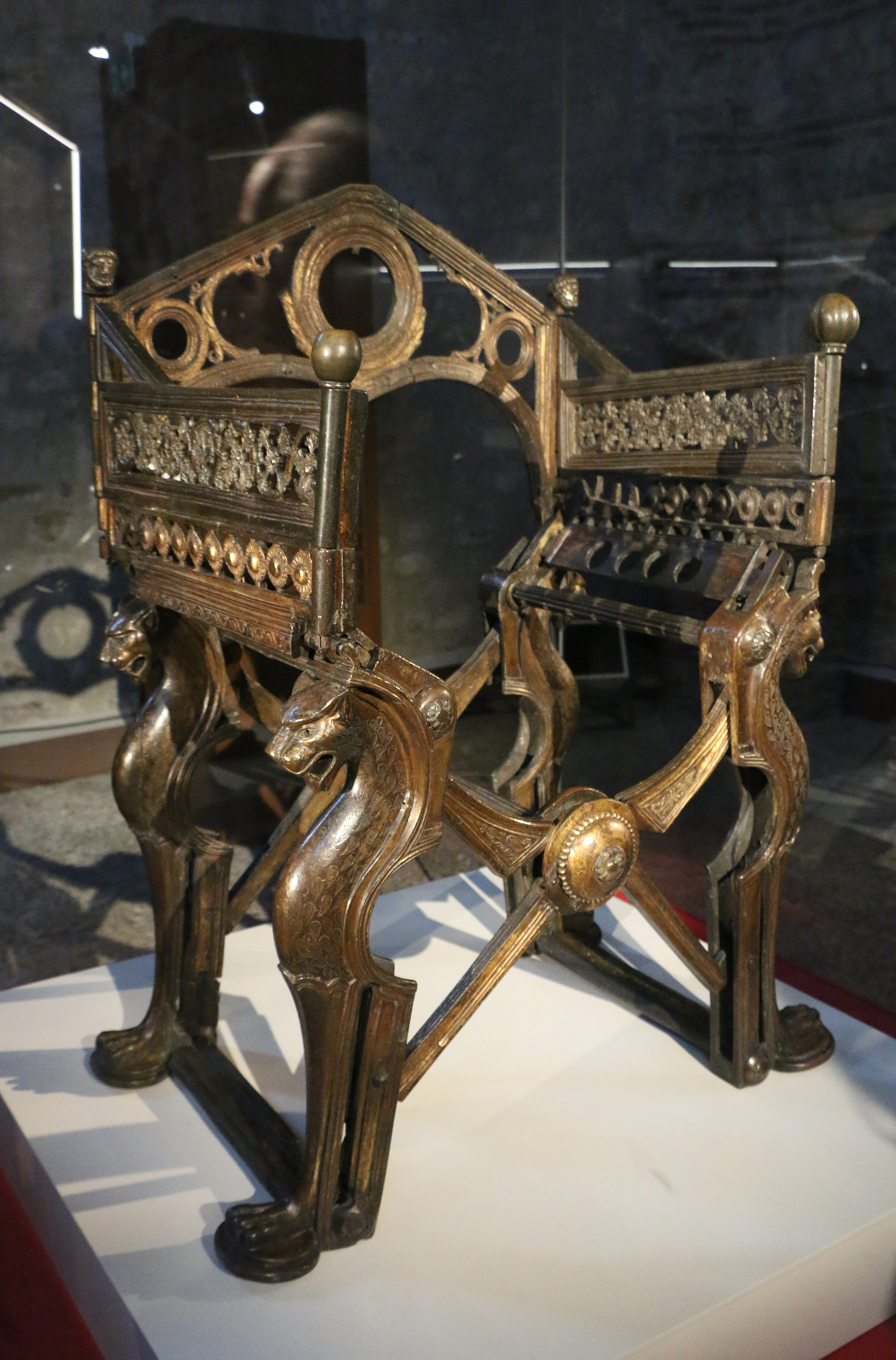
Throne of Dagobert, bronze, seventh-ninth century. Paris, France

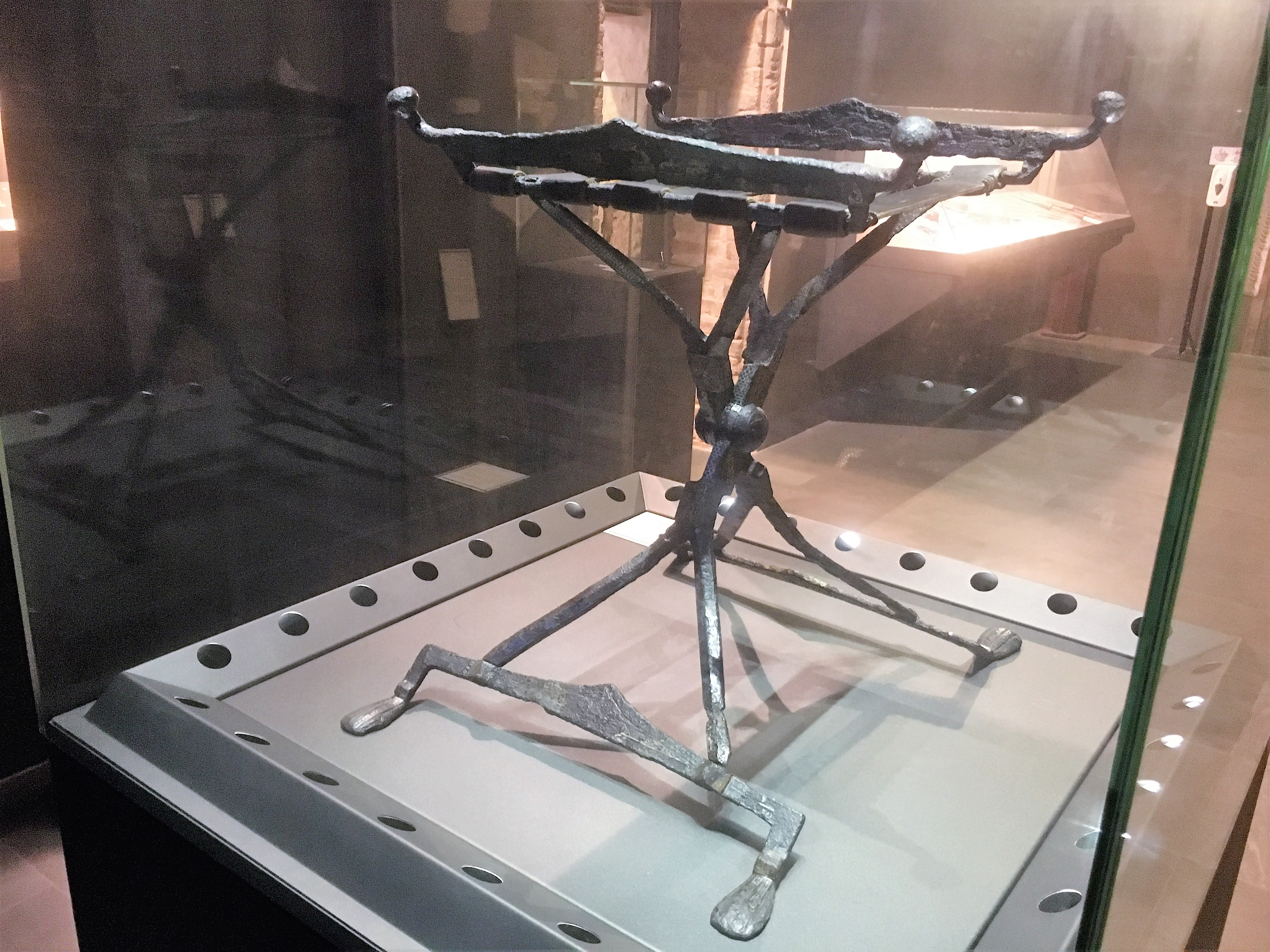
Sella Plicatilis, ninth-tenth century. Pavia City Museums, Italy

Folding chairs or stools were used as seating in the Mediterranean area in the fifteenth–thirteenth century BC. Folding chairs also were used as grave goods in the richest graves. A folding chair of ebony and ivory with gold fittings was found in Tutankhamun's tomb in Egypt.

Folding chairs were used in Ancient Egypt, Minoan Greece, and Ancient Rome, as well as during the Nordic Bronze Age and the Medieval Period. The frame was mostly made of wood, and seldom made of metal. The wood was inlaid with artistic carvings, gilded, and decorated with ivory. In Northern Europe, the remains of more than 18 folding chairs are known dating back to the Nordic Bronze Age. The Guldhøj chair, was found near Vamdrup, Denmark. The ancient Daensen folding chair and another one dated to Medieval times in Endsee were found in graves in southeastern Germany.

In China, folding stools date to at least the 2nd century with full folding chairs (Jiaoyi) being first seen in the Song dynasty from the 10th century onwards.

The folding chair became widespread during the Middle Ages. Folding chairs called faldstools were treasured as liturgical furniture pieces, used by bishops when not residing at their own cathedral.

In the United States, an early patent for a folding chair was by John Cram in 1855. On July 7, 1911, Nathaniel Alexander patented a folding chair whose main innovation was including a book rest. In 1947, Fredric Arnold created the first aluminum folding chair with fabric strapping for the seat and back. By 1957, the Fredric Arnold Company of Brooklyn, New York, was manufacturing more than 14,000 chairs per day. In 2024, folding chairs often are made of hard plastic, metal, or wood.

== Modern designs ==
Folding chairs typically weigh from 2 to 5 kilograms (4.4 to 11.0 pounds) and are produced in a variety of styles, folding mechanisms, and materials.

=== Lawn chair ===
A common form of folding chair is often referred to as a lawn chair. It typically consists of a collapsible frame with a fabric covering. They often are used outdoors at sporting events and parks.

=== Leg pivoting ===
Folding chair legs can pivot to fold either under the seat, or at the seat.

Most folding chairs pivot at the seat level. The seat aligns between the back supports. The back support and the front legs are the same part. There are, however, several designs that fold under the seat. Side-X stools consist of two X-shaped pieces with a sheet of cloth between them that becomes the seat. Front-X chairs are similar to side-X stools, but have the addition of a backrest. Side-X chairs are unique because the support for the backrest and front foot is the same part. The seat is collapsed to align between the sidebars, either down between the front legs, or up to align between back-sidebars. Mechanisms vary, but the supports for the back and the front feet are invariably the same part.

== Pricing ==
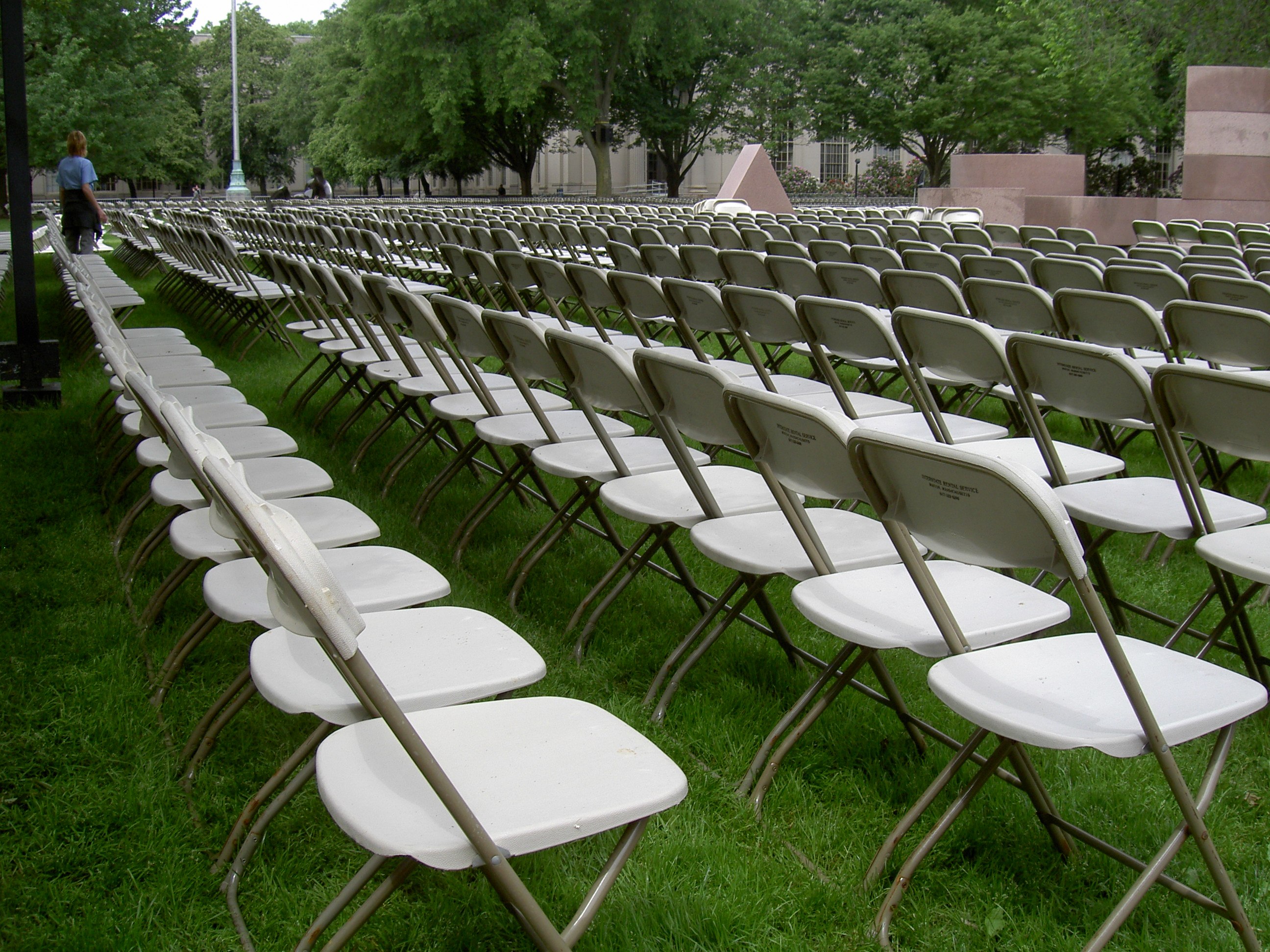
Folding chairs of the side-X variety set up for an outdoor event

Prices and quality can be roughly divided into four categories, and are largely the same as for stacking chairs:

=== Low range ===
This light and inexpensive furniture is usually made from steel tubing, with a plastic seat and backrest. This style is very common in homes, churches, schools, and community events.

=== Mid-range ===
These are sturdy and a greater variety in styles and materials. They are typically not upholstered. They cost from approximately $25 apiece (2008). Their primary use is seating for large arenas, outdoor or places of worship, but also cafes and brasseries.

=== Upper range ===
These folding chairs are often reinforced multiply and come with padded seats and backrest. These are mainly sold for sporting events. The seat is sometimes made to fall backward so that it stands upright, making rainwater run off the upholstered seat.

=== High end ===
Folding chairs can extend into the range of luxury items.

== In popular culture ==
Specifically modified and lighter folding chairs are used as weapons in professional wrestling. The investigation into Chris Benoit's death cited chronic traumatic encephalopathy, which is often caused by chair shots to the head and other related concussions as a leading cause of his symptoms. Chair shots to the head are now banned in the WWE and All Elite Wrestling, and the use of chairs was reduced to prevent injury.

== See also ==
- Camping chair
- Curule seat
- Daensen folding chair
- Deck chair
- Director's chair
- Faldstool
- Folding seat
- Glastonbury chair
- Jump seat
- List of chairs
- X-chair
