= Camp bed =

Small portable, lightweight bed

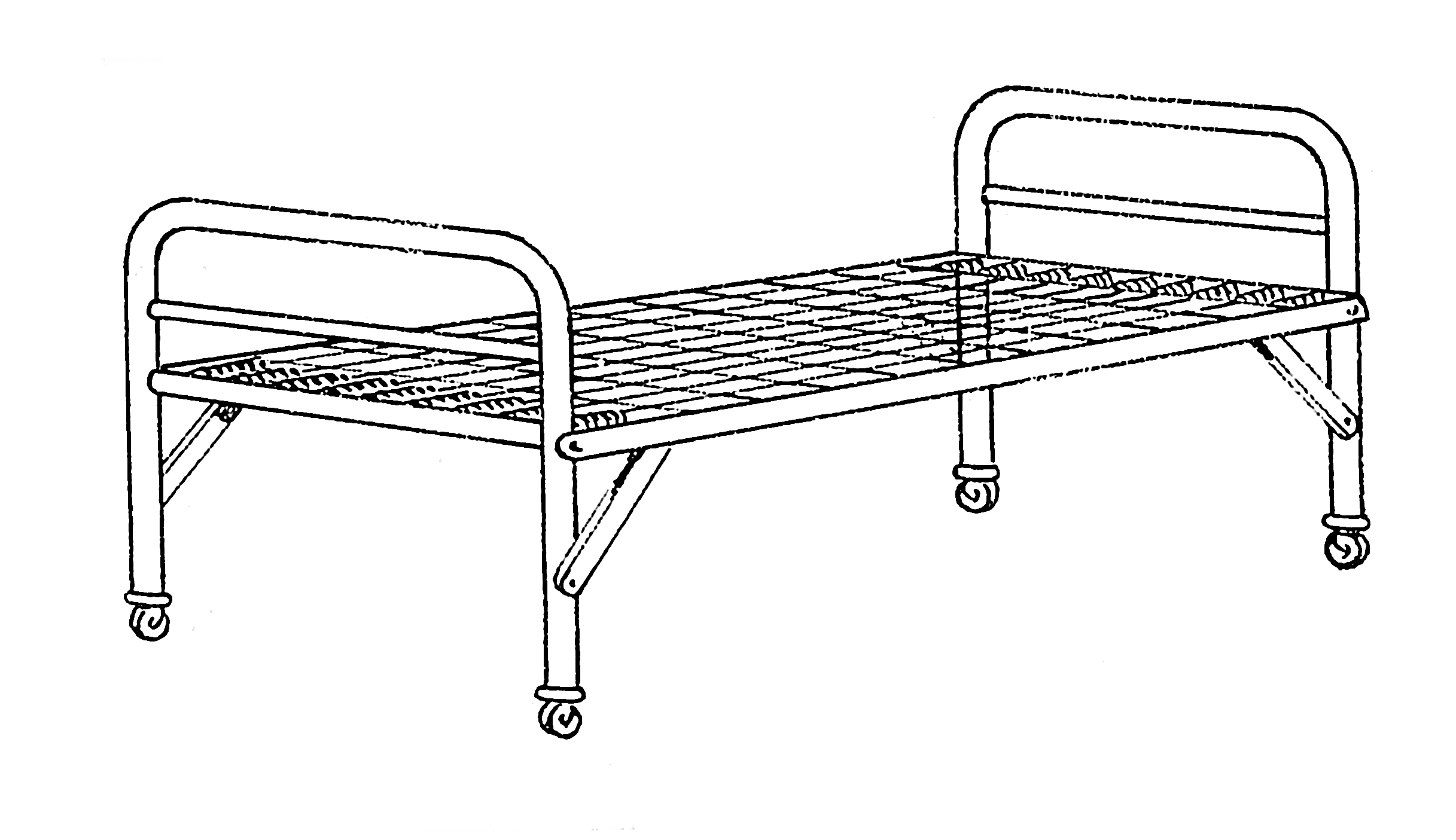
Camp bed

A camp bed is a narrow, light-weight bed, often made of sturdy cloth stretched over a folding frame. The term camp bed is common in the United Kingdom, but in North America they are often referred to as cots. Camp beds are used by the military in temporary camps and in emergency situations where large numbers of people are in need of housing after disasters. They are also used for recreational purposes, such as overnight camping trips.

== Ancient history ==
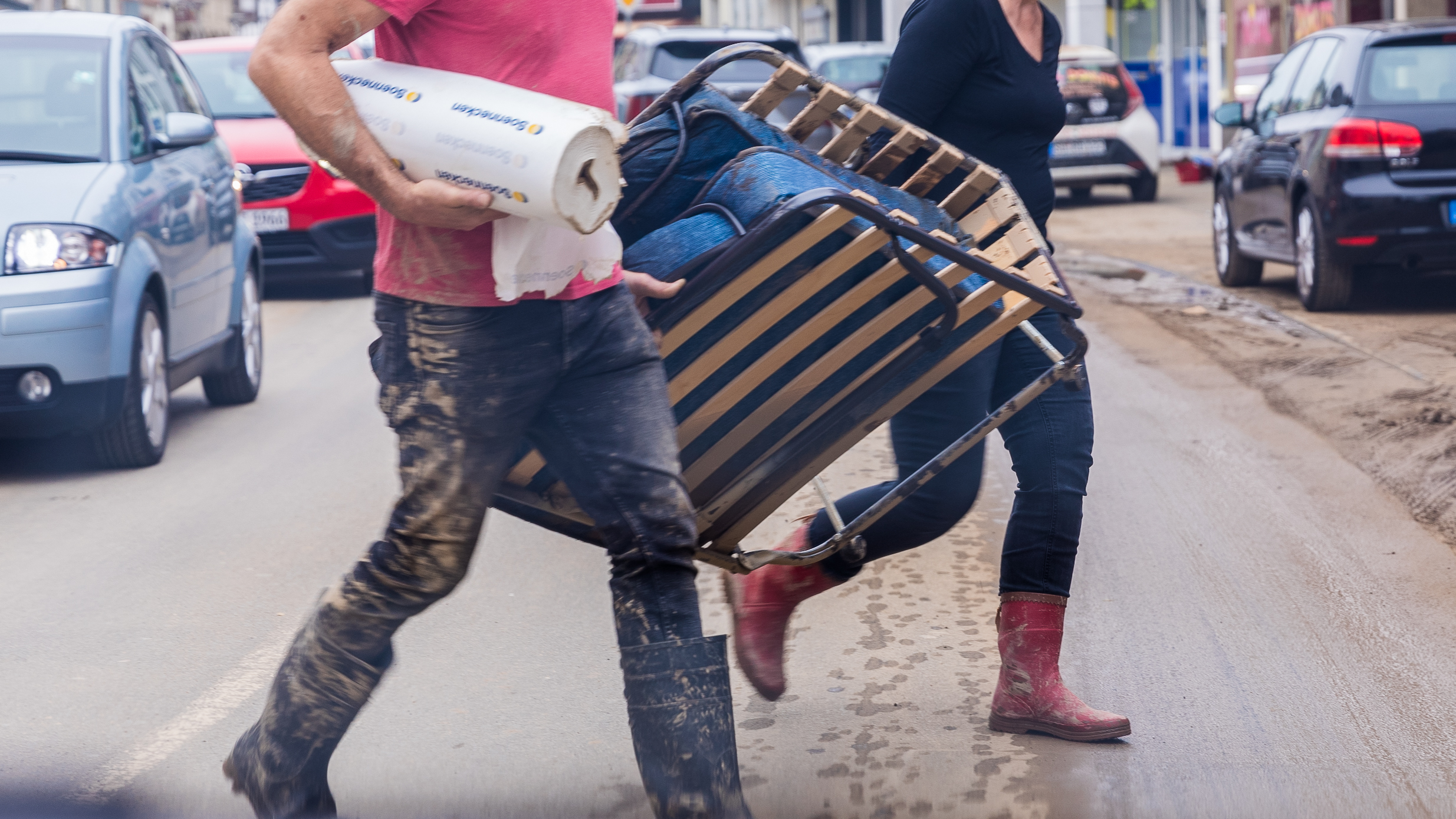
Foldable and portable bed being carried by two people during a flood in Rheinbach, July 2021

It is believed that King Tutankhamun, who reigned in Egypt from approximately 1332 to 1323 BC, may have had the first camping bed. When Tutankhamun's tomb was opened in 1922, a room full of furniture was found to contain a three-section camping bed that folded up into a Z shape. Though the king, who had a clubfoot, may never have taken part in long-distance explorations, the elaborate folding bed suggests he had an interest in camping and hunting.

== 18th- and early 19th-century history ==
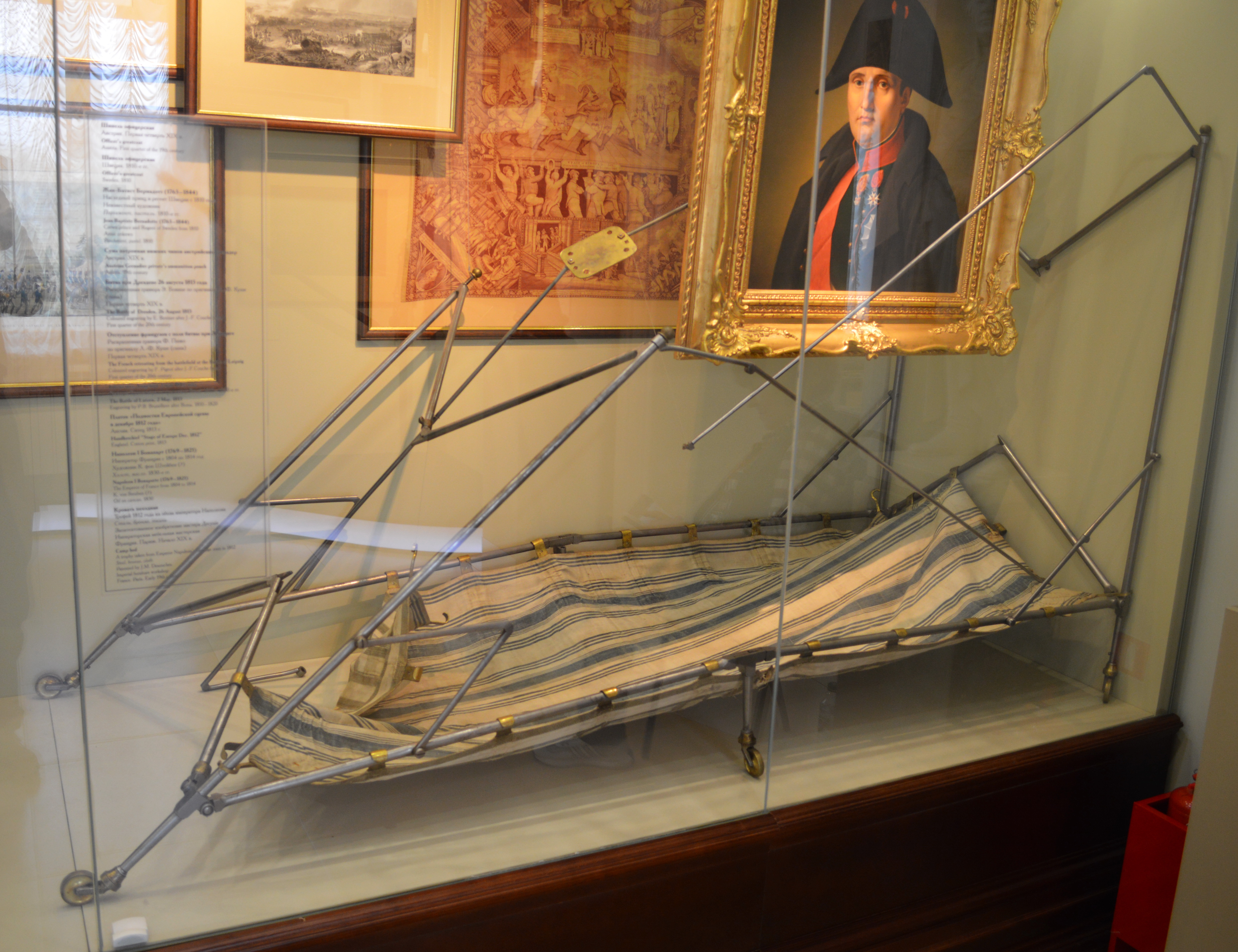
Camp bed of Napoleon Bonaparte. Borodino Museum.

The New-York Historical Society owns a camp bed thought to have been used by General George Washington during the American Revolutionary War, including during the hard winter at Valley Forge. It is made in three sections, with each section consisting of a wood frame stretched with canvas, supported by an X-shaped wooden base with iron mounts. According to the donor, Washington gave the camp bed to his recording secretary, Richard Varick, at the close of the war. It was passed down through Varick's descendants until it was donated to the Historical Society in 1871.

Napoleon Bonaparte and his high-ranking officers used camp beds with a frame of gilt copper. The bed's six legs had wheels, and its vertical poles could support a canopy. Striped twill was attached to the frame by means of hooks in the copper frame. Napoleon died in such a camp bed on 5 May 1821, on the island of Saint Helena.

== Gallery ==
Various camp beds

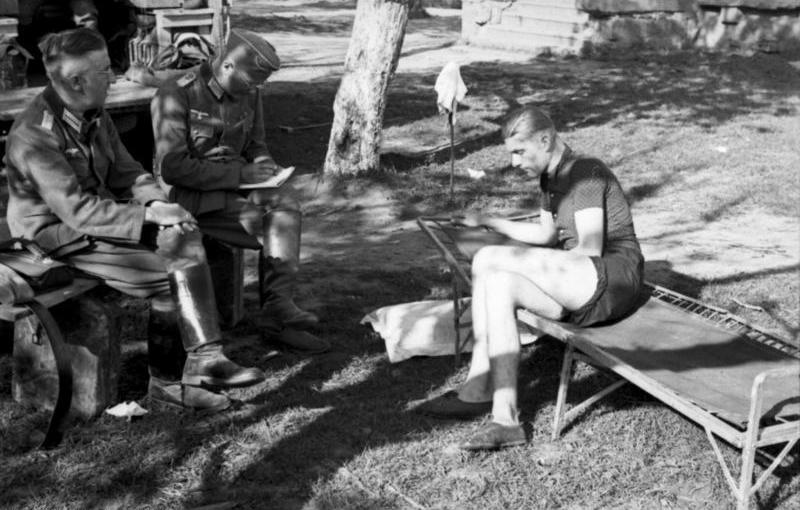
German soldier on a collapsible camp bed, 1941

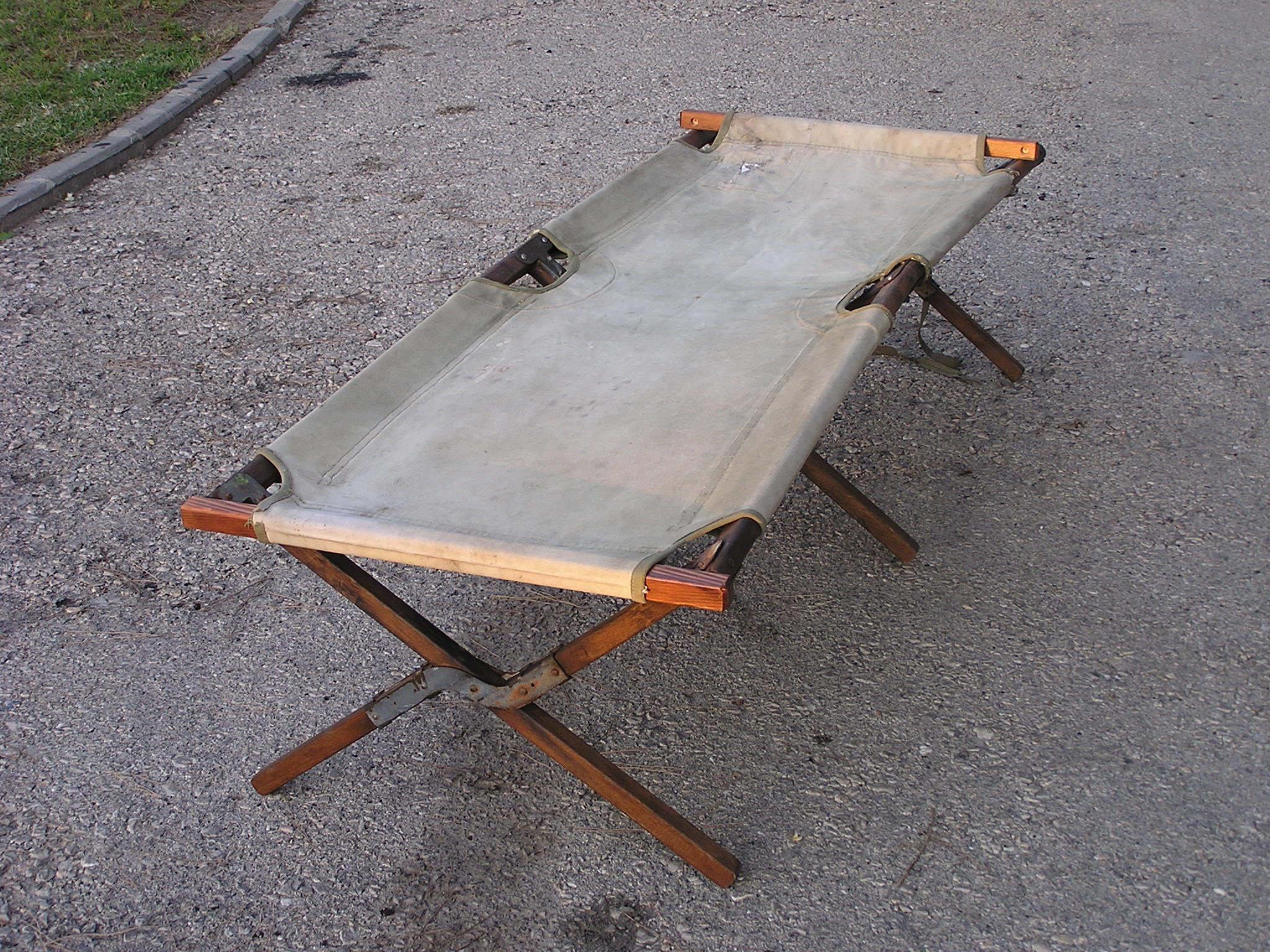
American Army Folding Bed, used in World War II

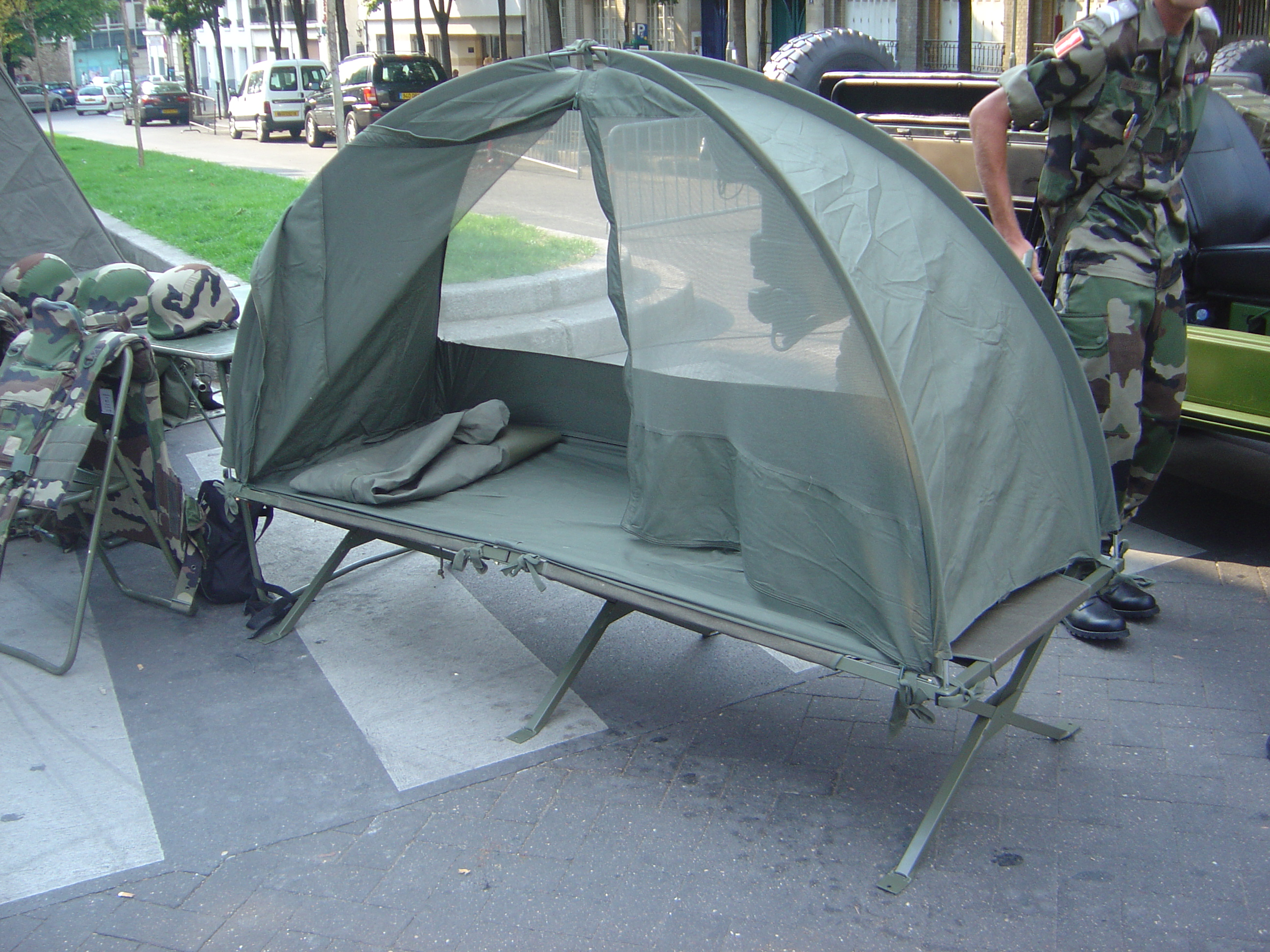
French portable field bed with mosquito net

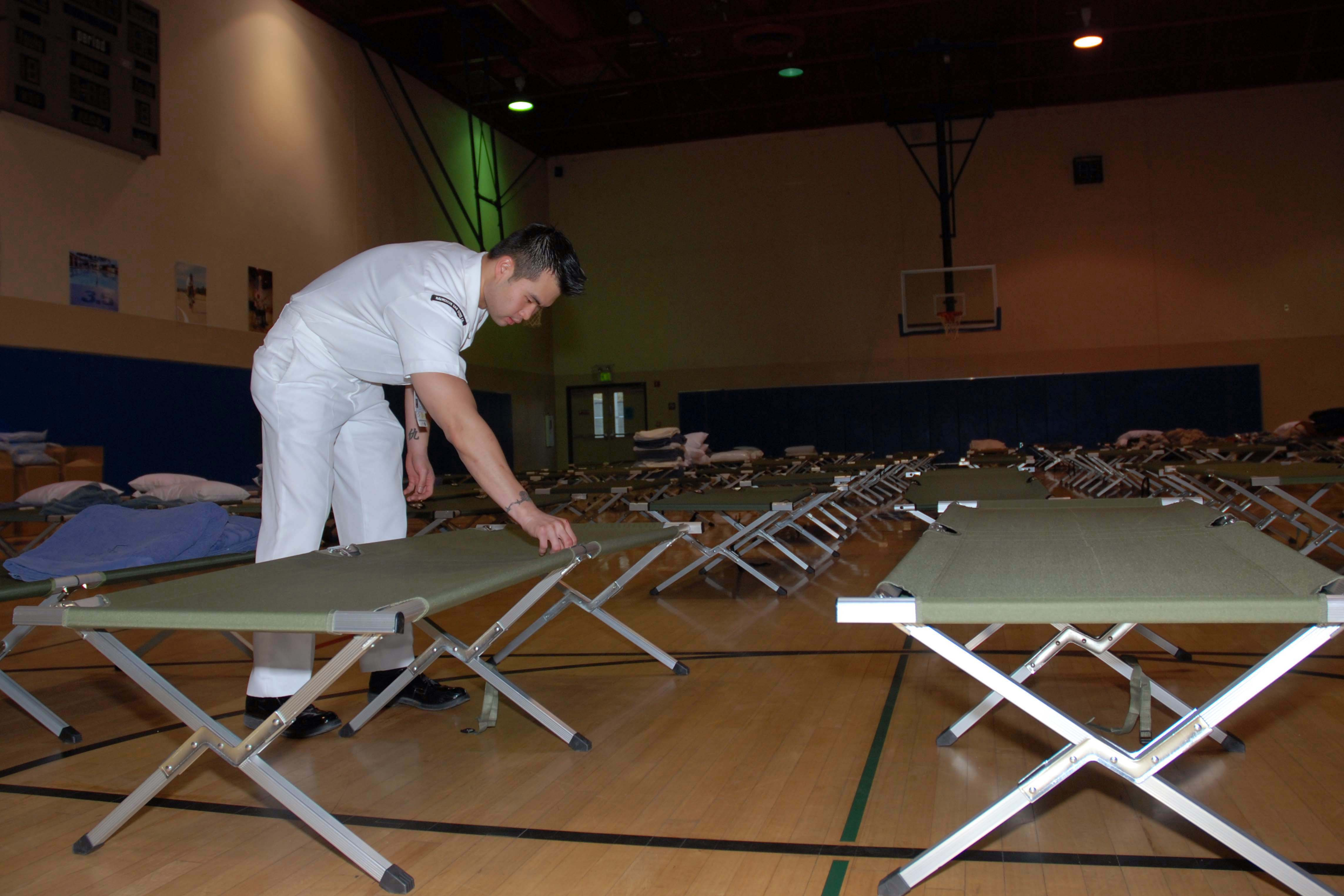
Cots for potential evacuees from the 2007 California wildfires

== See also ==
- Sleeping bag
- Camping chair
- Stretcher
- Wall bed
