= Daensen folding chair =

Remains of a Bronze Age folding chair found in Lower Saxony, Germany

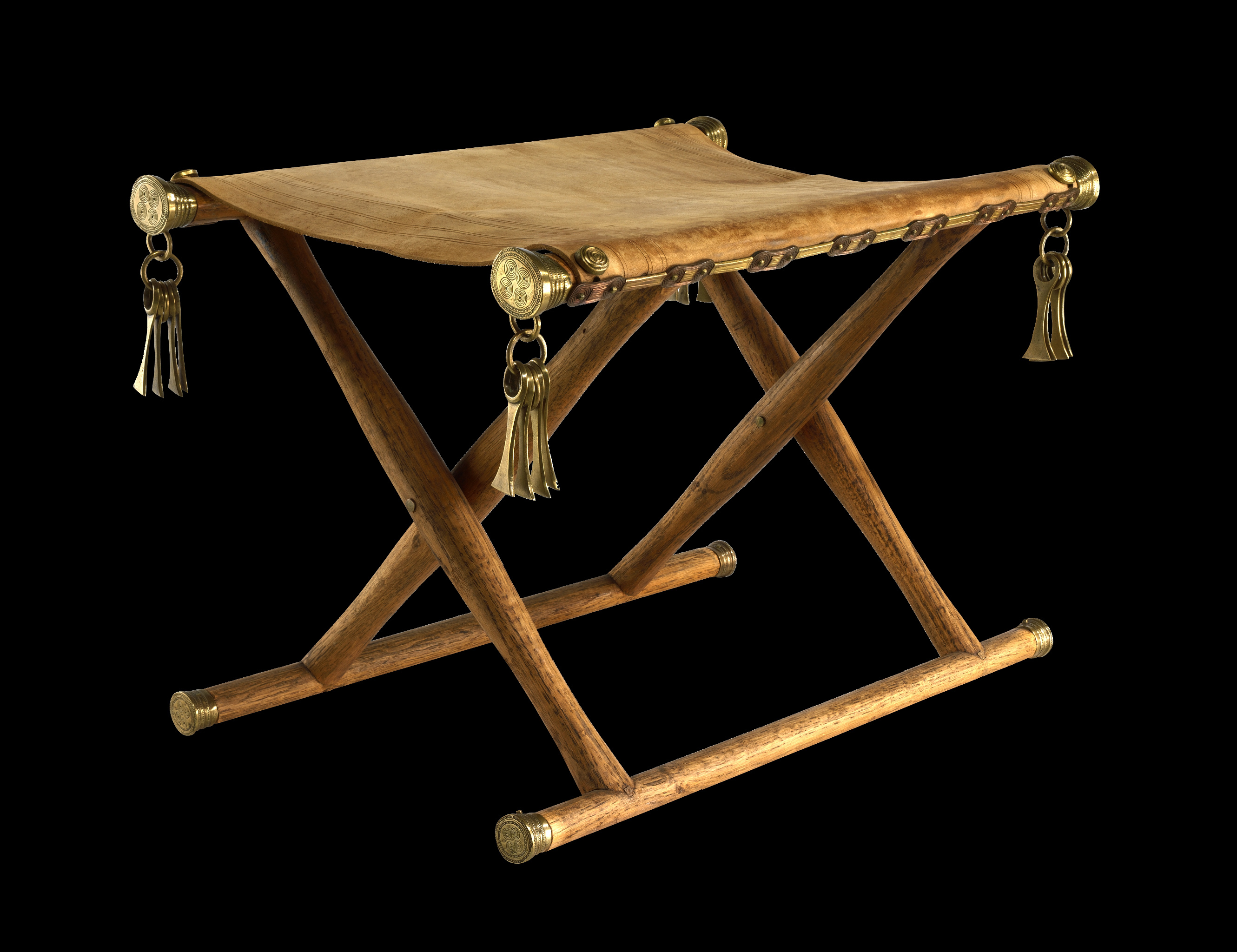
Reconstruction of the Daensen folding chair

The Daensen folding chair consists of the metallic remains of a folding chair that were discovered in 1899 in sand from a Bronze Age tumulus near Daensen, a part of Buxtehude, Lower Saxony, Germany. At the time, the chair was the southernmost and most richly decorated example of the eighteen known folding chairs of the Nordic Bronze Age in Northern Europe. The fittings, along with a reconstruction, are in the permanent exhibition of the Archaeological Museum Hamburg in Harburg, Hamburg.

== History ==
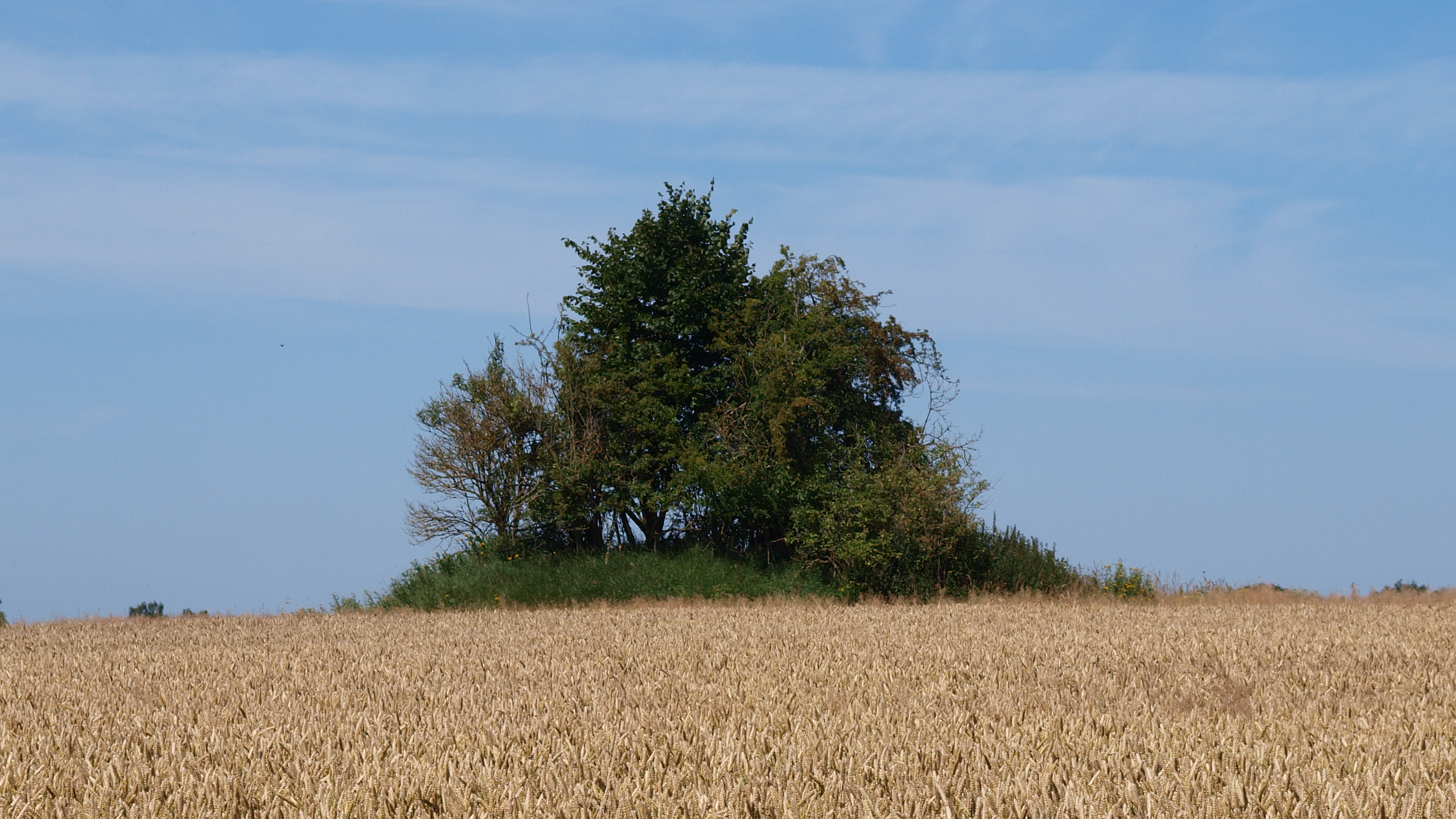
Reconstructed tumulus Backelsberg from the south

The tumulus is located in a prominent location approximately 300 meters northwest of the village Daensen, at 53.424047°N 9.688783°E in open countryside owned by former farmer and municipal mayor Eickhoff. The Bronze Age tumulus is known as Backelsberg or Baaksberg and, according to local legend, contains the remains of a Chauci prince called Baak. or Back Before 1897, half of the northern mound was removed for sand extraction. In the centre of the mound Eickhoff's workers discovered a rectangular stone packing of boulders. Inside they found bones and a complete human skull. The workers gave the bones to a dog. Their work was witnessed by the Moisburg pastor Wittkopf who noted his observations in his Parishs book of accounts:

This hill was until 1879, removed from the north end half ago and it found a large oblong of unhewn granite, containing nothing special. Further more in the middle of a bunch of medium-sized boulders, about 4 feet high, on the shallow side of the same was lying residues of burnt human bones, a complete skull, with e.g. two very healthy molars and some other bones, which were not destroyed by fire, but by age. The skull was in the west, and there at the east there was a line gray ash-colored earth, without any epithets, and all this was overwhelmed with 3-4 feet of earth. N.B. Here lies the Germanic Chauci heros Back buried. Farmers Eickhoff's servants have profaned his rest and his head was thrown before a dog who abducted him. Sic transit gloria mundi

In 1899, sand was again removed from the mound again, and this time the workers discovered a second stone circle. In its interior they found several bronze fitting and partially gold decorated fittings, including two 45 centimetres (18 in) long stripes with gold inlays, which they broke into several pieces. In November 1899, Eickhoff forwarded a part of the fitting along with a ribbed arm ring of bronze to the museum. In 1934, the museum's director Willi Wegewitz acquired the remaining fittings from Eickhoff's sons, for the museum.

== Findings ==
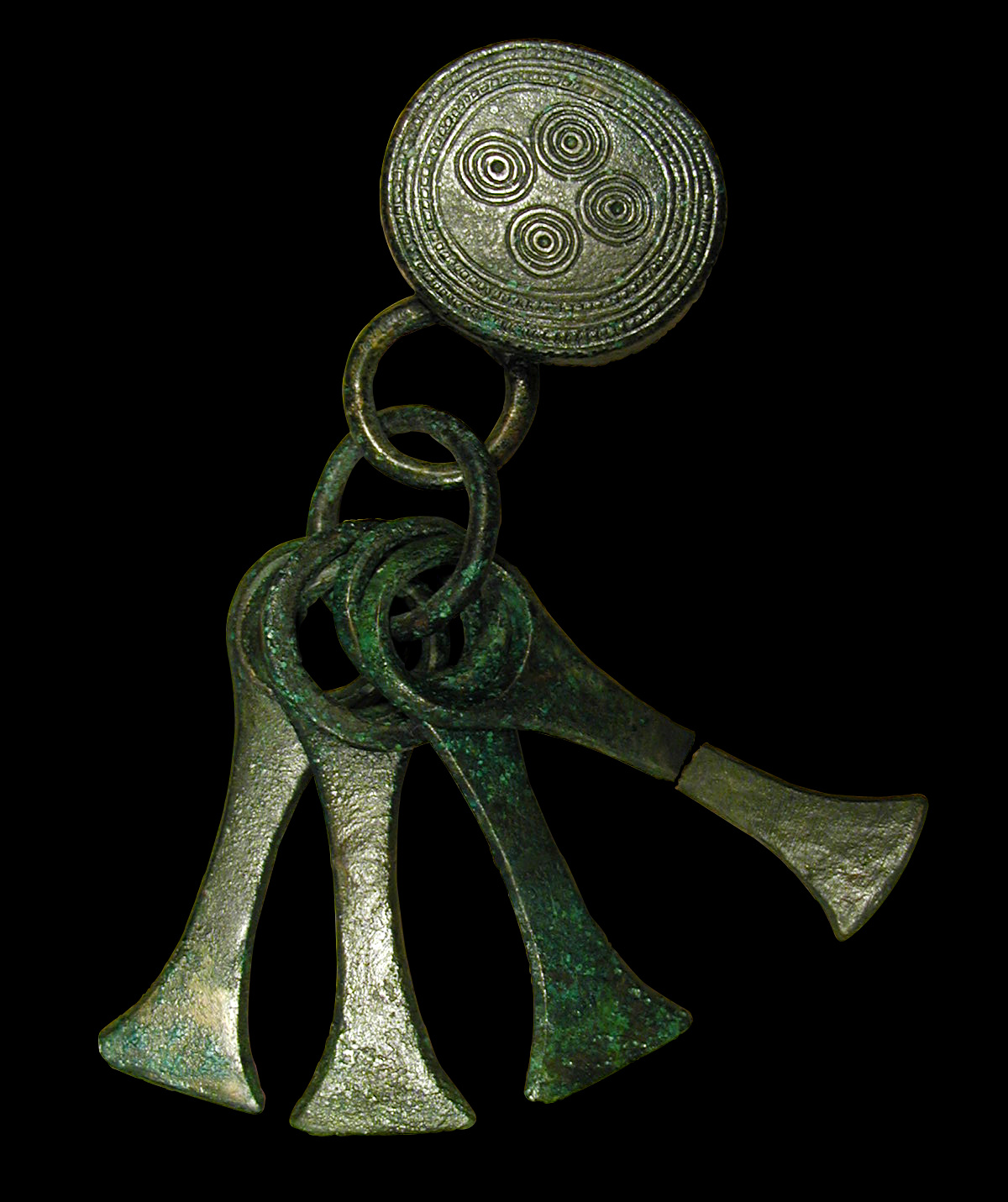
Bronze knob with rattle fittings

The remains of the folding chair consist of four bronze knobs with diameters of 36 to 40 millimetres (1.4–1.6 in) with 15 millimetres (0.59 in) long spouts and a total length of 23 millimetres (0.91 in). The end caps are ribbed and their faces decorated with a pattern of four concentric circles. A cast loop with a diameter of 29 millimetres (1.1 in) supports a ring of 28 millimetres (1.1 in) diameter with four rattle 73 millimetres (2.9 in) long plates. These components were attached to the frame of the seat. Two small knobs with diameters 27 to 29 millimetres (1.1–1.1 in) and lengths of 18 millimetres (0.71 in) were found among the baseboards of the stool. Most likely the stool had originally four of these knobs, the other two being presumed lost. There were also four bronze studs with gold plated heads. The nail heads are 18 millimetres (0.71 in) in diameter and have a pin length of 27 millimetres (1.1 in). Three figure-eight shaped bronze fittings of 41 millimetres (1.6 in) length, 15 millimetres (0.59 in) width and thicknesses of 2 millimetres (0.079 in) with line ornaments wearing a gold metal insert at the waist. The gold plate was fixed by two fine incisions in the bronze fitting and then folded on the reverse. Two rectangular bronze plates of 38 millimetres (1.5 in) in length, 7 millimetres (0.28 in) in width and about 1.8 millimetres (0.071 in) thickness are entirely covered with gold foil and bent around the edges for fixation. Furthermore, there are five rectangular fitting plates whose broken edges were put together. It is most likely that some of their fragments are still missing. Only a few organic components were preserved, one is a piece of leather, and there were seven or eight pieces of wood, one of ash, the other of maple. Among the pieces of wood, there is a corner piece and one with the mounting of the seat's leather. The remains of the chair have been typologically dated to c. 1400 BC.

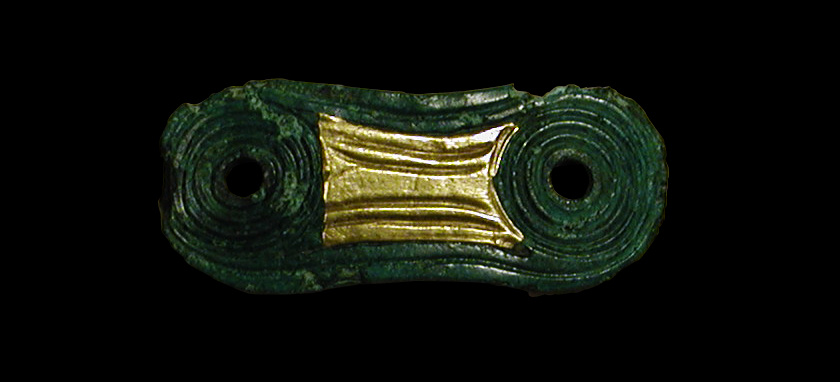
Bronze fitting with gold decoration

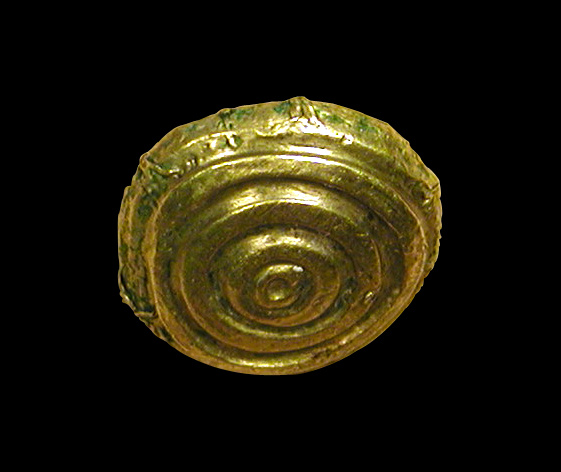
Gold plate of a studs head

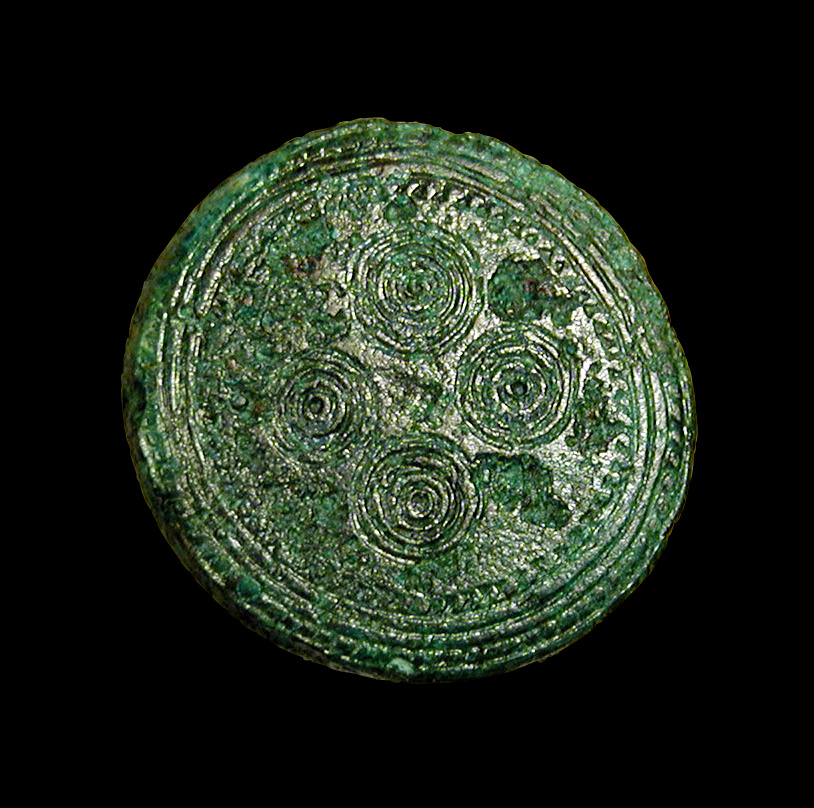
Decorated end cap

== Reconstruction ==
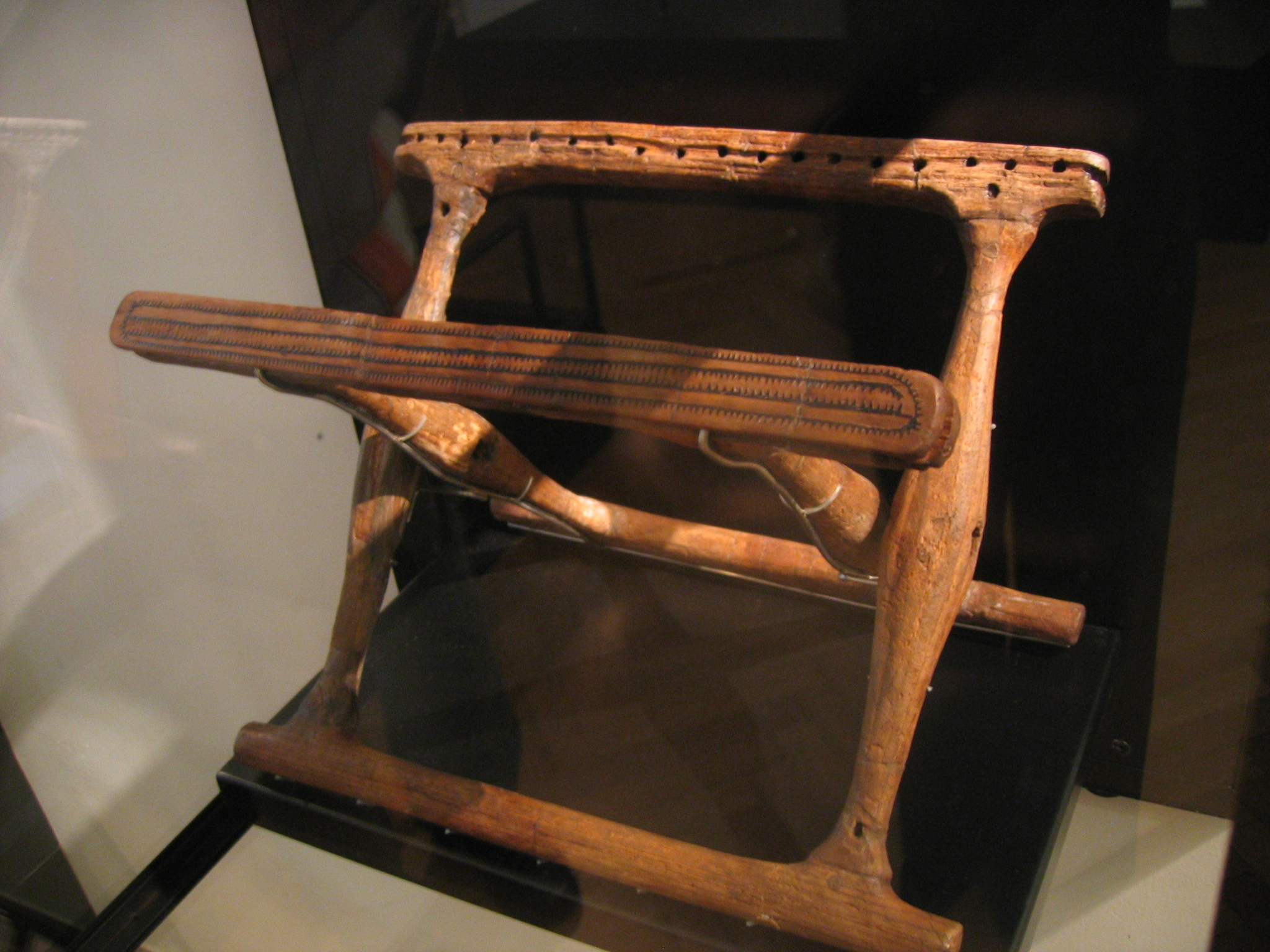
Folding chair from Guldhøj (Denmark, second half of the fourteenth century BC) as sample for the reconstruction of the wooden construction of the Daensen folding chair

Distribution of folding chairs of the Nordic Bronze Age

Compared to earlier previous finds from grave mounds and tree coffin burials in Denmark, Sweden, Schleswig-Holstein, and Mecklenburg the present metal objects were identified as fitting parts of a folding chair that is typical for the Nordic Bronze Age. These numerous comparative findings in connection with the survived wooden structures of the Vamdrup folding chair found at Guldhøj in the Danish municipality of Ribe in 1891, allowed a precise reconstruction of the Daensen folding chair.

== Interpretation ==
Due to the improper excavation and documentation of the find, precise statements about the archaeological context are not possible. The chair is the most magnificent decorated folding chair of the Nordic Bronze Age. This type of chair, or their fittings, is present in 17 comparable finds. The remains of two folding chair fittings originate from hoards, all the rest were grave goods from tree coffin or grave mound burials.

Given the role of the folding chair in placing the sitter above others who are seated on the floor, it is possible that the individual buried in Daensen was a high-ranking person, a religious official or chieftain. The absence of further grave goods may indicate that the grave had been raided by antique grave robbers. Comparably equipped graves with folding chairs typically included additional offerings such as jewellery, household items, and weapons that are absent in Daensen.

The size of the ribbed bronze arm ring bracelet found and provided by farmer Eickhoff to the museum must come from a burial of a woman, supporting the interpretation of the burial of a religious leader.

More recently, in Endsee, another village of Bavaria in southeastern Germany, a medieval high-status burial dated to about 600 AD is that of a woman with a similar chair included among her extensive grave goods that has an unusual, full metal frame.

Similar folding chairs also originate from Ancient Egypt, whose most famous specimen comes from Tutankhamun's tomb of 1330 BC, demonstrating the extensive international connections of the later Bronze Age.

== Bibliography ==
- Wegewitz, Willi (1994). "Der Klappstuhl aus Daensen". Das Abenteuer der Archäologie (in German). Oldenburg: Isensee: 187–193. ISBN 3-89442-230-0.
- Wegewitz, Willi (1988). "Der Klappstuhl von Daensen". Hammaburg N.F. (in German). 8: 36–37. ISSN 0173-0886.
