= Cape Cod Maritime Museum =

Maritime museum in Massachusetts, United States

Coordinates: 41°39′06″N 70°16′46″W

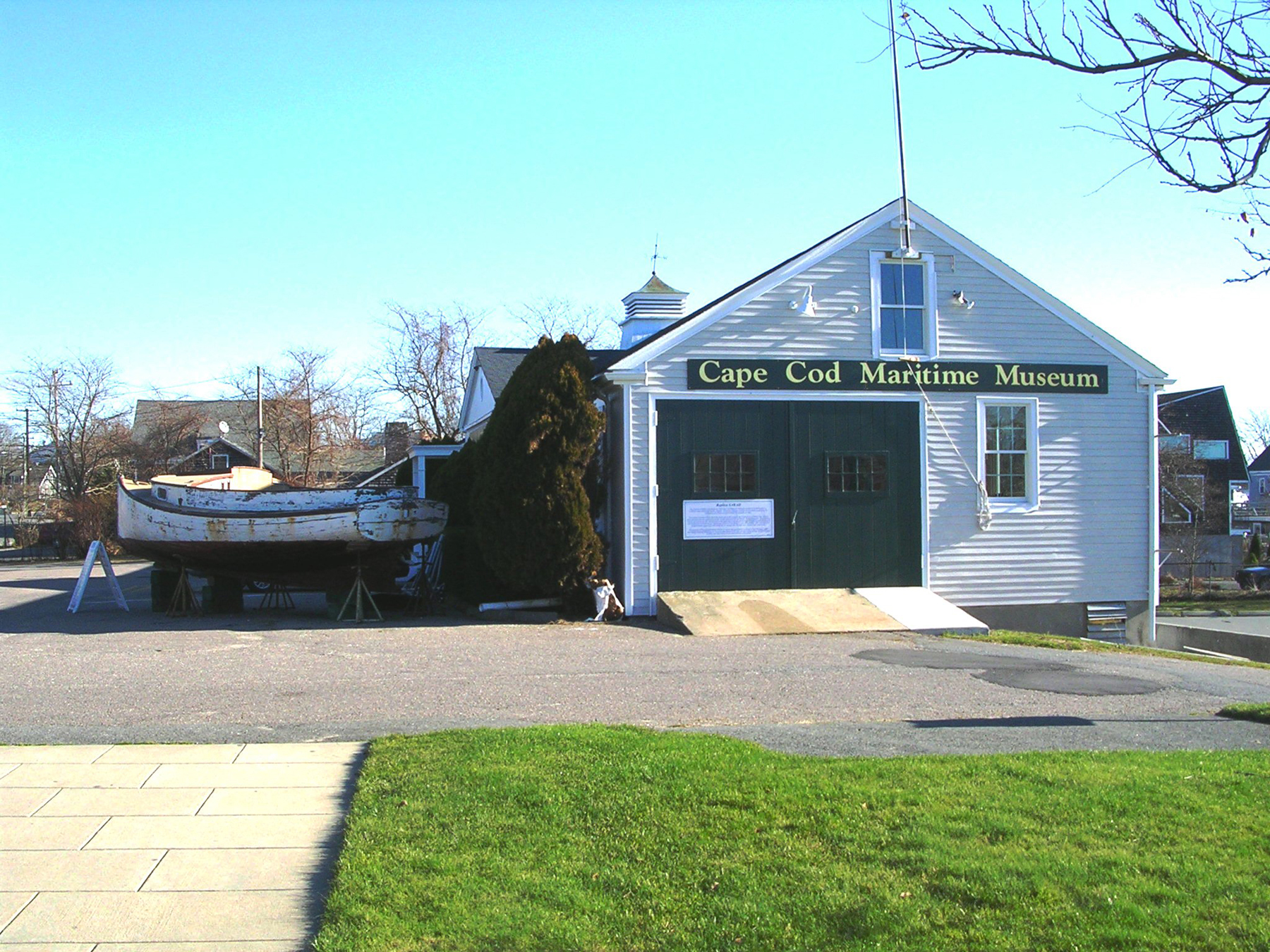
The Cape Cod Maritime Museum in 2009

Cape Cod Maritime Museum is a maritime museum at 135 South Street in Hyannis, Massachusetts with a focus on Cape Cod's maritime history, boat building, yachting, and nautical art. The museum formerly contained the remains of the Sparrow Hawk, the earliest known surviving ship from the colonial American era, which is currently stored at Plymouth's Pilgrim Hall Museum.

== See also ==
- List of maritime museums in the United States
