= Turned chair =

Style of Elizabethan or Jacobean turned furniture

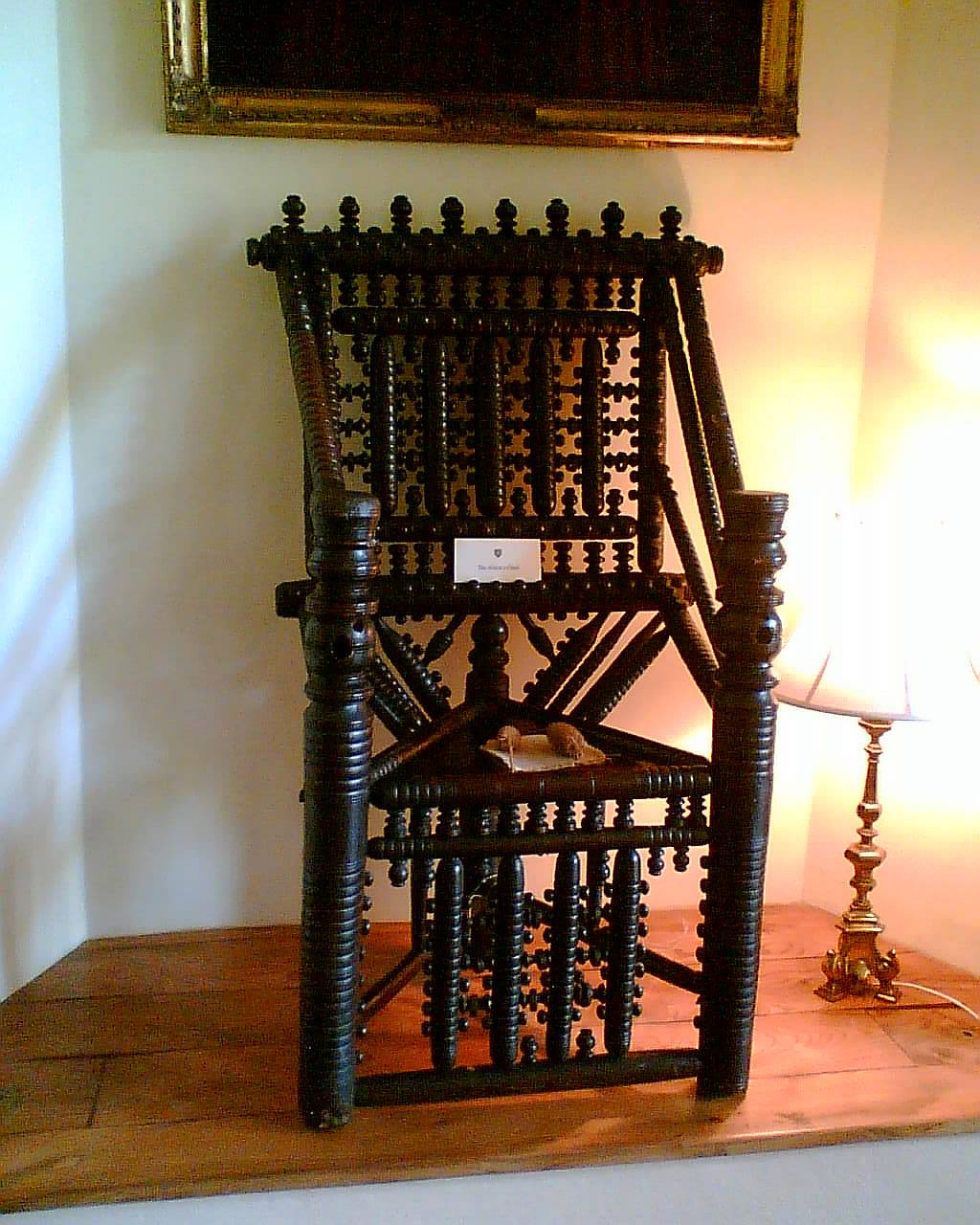
Turned chair, in the Bishop's Palace, Wells, Somerset, England (Early 17th century)

Turned chairs – sometimes called thrown chairs or spindle chairs – represent a style of Elizabethan or Jacobean turned furniture that were in vogue in the late 16th and early 17th century England, New England and Holland. In turned furniture, the individual wooden spindles of the piece are made by shaping them with chisels and gouges while they are being turned on a lathe. Joiners or carpenters who made such furniture were termed "turners", or "bodgers", hence the surname Turner. Today, turned chairs – as well as various turned decorative elements – are still commonly made, but by machines rather than by hand.

== History ==
The earliest turned chairs are of uncertain date, but they became common in the 17th century. Before this date there are rare examples that claim to date back to before 1300, but most of these early examples are from manuscripts.

The characteristics of a turned chair are that the frame members are turned cylindrical on a lathe. The main uprights are usually heavier and plainly turned, the lighter spindles infilling between them are more decoratively turned, often with repeated bobbin turning, so as to appear as a series of balls, beads or bails. The complexity of this turning varies widely, and is used as a guide to identifying the region of origin. Some chairs have so many spindles that their backs and sides form an almost solid latticework, akin to the Arabic lattice windows or Mashrabiya. Eighteenth century turned chairs became far simpler. Eventually their techniques influenced the celebratedly simple and elegant style of the Shaker chair, still largely made by turning.

Three-legged chairs are common, particularly for older examples. The evolution of the chair is from the simple backless stool, commonly three-legged for stability. As there is no wide back, there is no reason to have more than one rear leg. These gave rise to the backstool, a backless stool with one leg extended upwards and later widened by a flat pad. As this pad developed further and wider it began to be supported by diagonal spindles for strength. These gave rise to the arms of the three-legged turned chair (illustrated). In time the turned chair gained a fourth leg and a square plan, becoming closer to the modern chair. Its evolution is through these three-legged stools though, not from the square chest and the throne-like box chairs.

Seats are commonly solid, but these are often replacements and their original material is uncertain. For later examples, especially from America, a rush seat is common.

Most turned chairs are of ash, but they are also found in fruitwoods and American specimens may use hickory, cherry and maple. Use of oak itself is relatively rare, but their age and relatively simple style means that they are normally counted as part of the "Age of Oak" furniture.

== Historical turned chairs (“Great Chairs”) ==
In early colonial New England, large wooden turned armchairs – which came to be called "Great Chairs" – are thought to have been used by leading officials as symbols of authority. In the 19th century, eminent names were attached to individual chairs, and their stylistic variants, which had been passed down through some of the "Mayflower families".

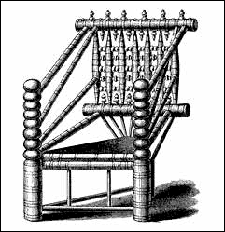
The "bizarre" chair reserved for Harvard's president

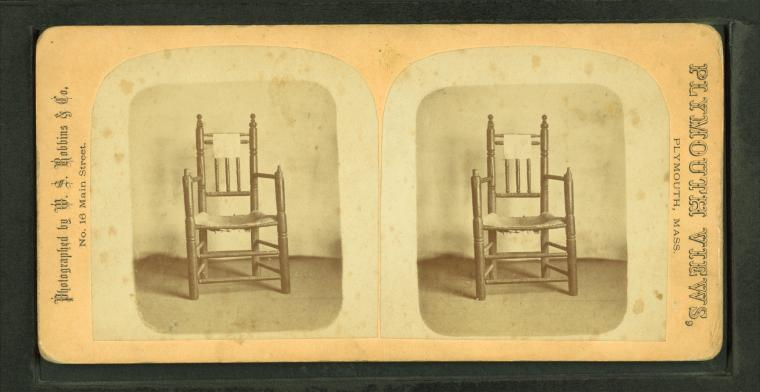
The original "Carver's Chair" in an old stereoscopic image.

The "Brewster Chair" (shown with a period wicker cradle) is at Pilgrim Hall Museum in Plymouth, Massachusetts.

- Holyoke Chair, or Harvard President's Chair – a three-square turned chair (made in England or Wales, ca. 1550-1600; exhibited at the Fogg Museum) said to be notably uncomfortable and prone to tipping over; reserved for Harvard’s president at commencement ceremonies since 1770.
- Carver Chair – a four-square turned chair (New England, ca. 1630-1657; exhibited at Pilgrim Hall Museum); traditionally associated with the first Plymouth Colony governor John Carver (pre-1584-1621); recently its association with Carver has been discounted, as it was determined to have been made of white ash, native to New England, and this (together with Carver’s death date, plus the fact that furniture was not made at Plymouth Colony until years later) indicate that he could not have owned it. A "Carver chair" is characterized by having three vertical and three horizontal spindles in the back, but no other turned spindles elsewhere.
- Brewster Chair – a four-square turned chair (England or New England, ca. 1630-1670; exhibited at Pilgrim Hall Museum); traditionally associated with Pilgrim elder William Brewster (ca. 1566-1644). "Brewster chairs" have turned spindles in the back, under the seat, and under the arms.
- Bradford Chair – a four-square turned chair (England or New England, ca. 1630-1657; exhibited at Pilgrim Hall Museum); traditionally associated with Plymouth Colony governor William Bradford (ca. 1590-1657). A "Bradford chair" is a slightly more elaborate version of a "Brewster chair", with an extra spanner in the back.

== Gallery ==
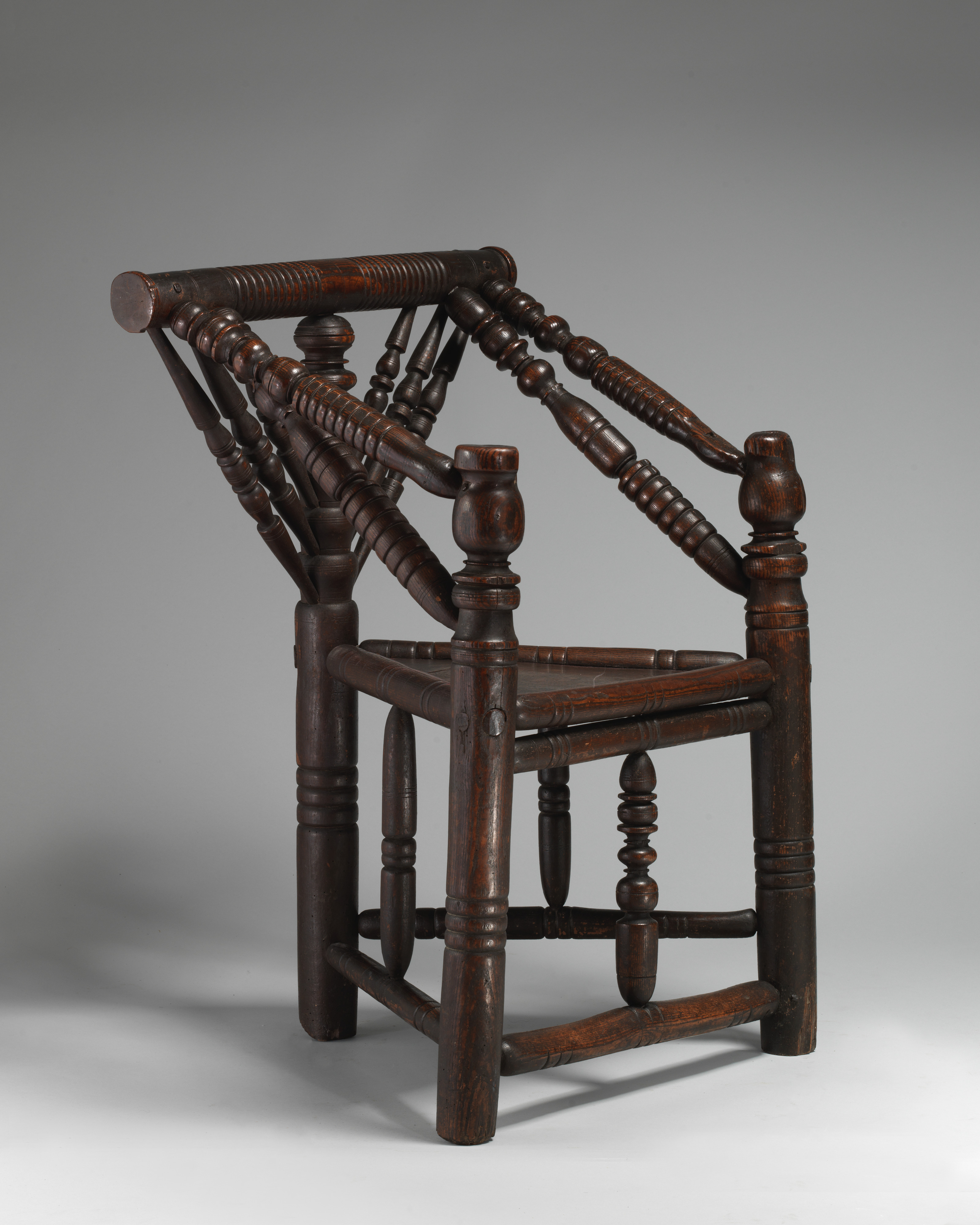
Three-legged chair, British, late 16th–early 17th century

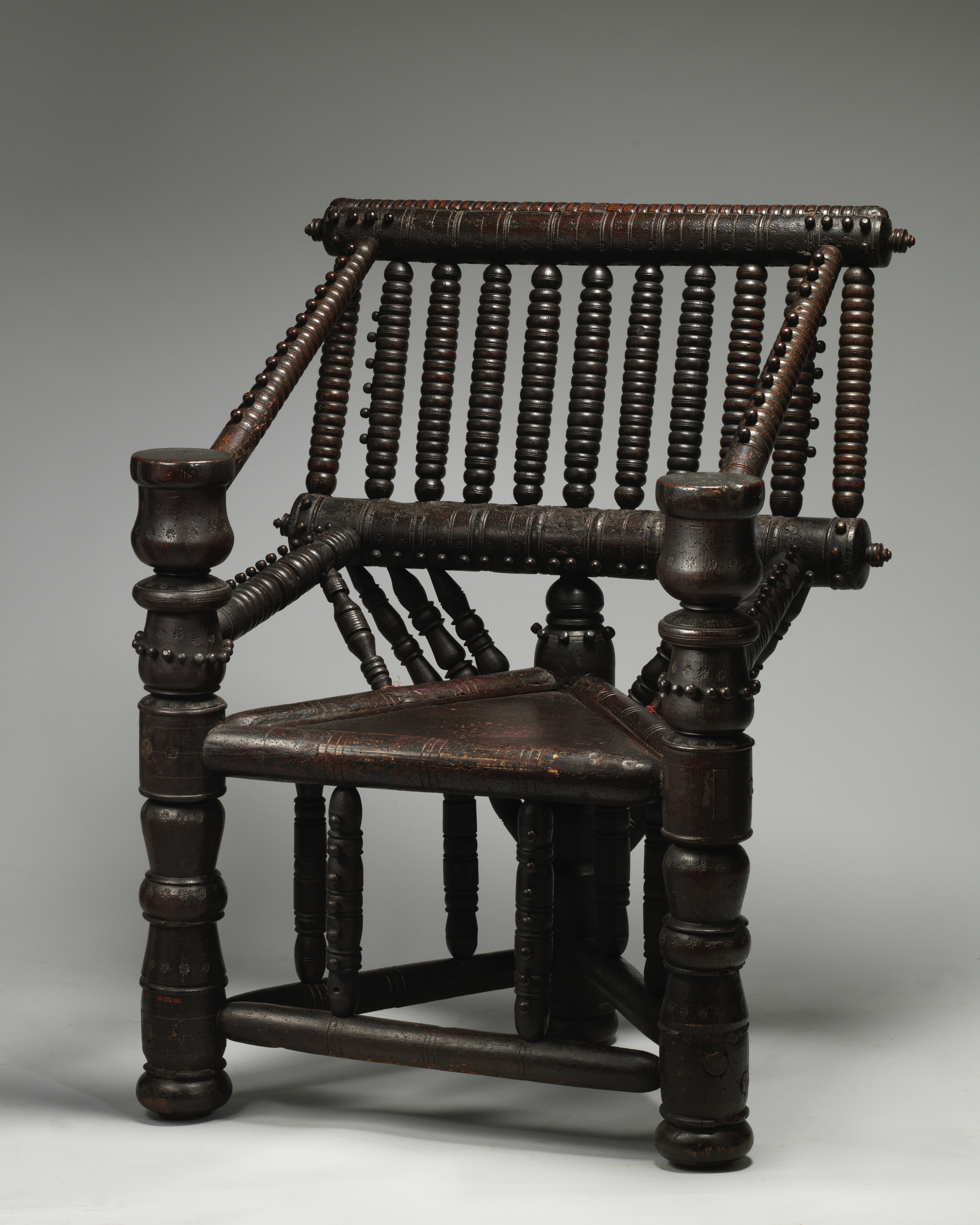
Turned chair, British, circa 1600

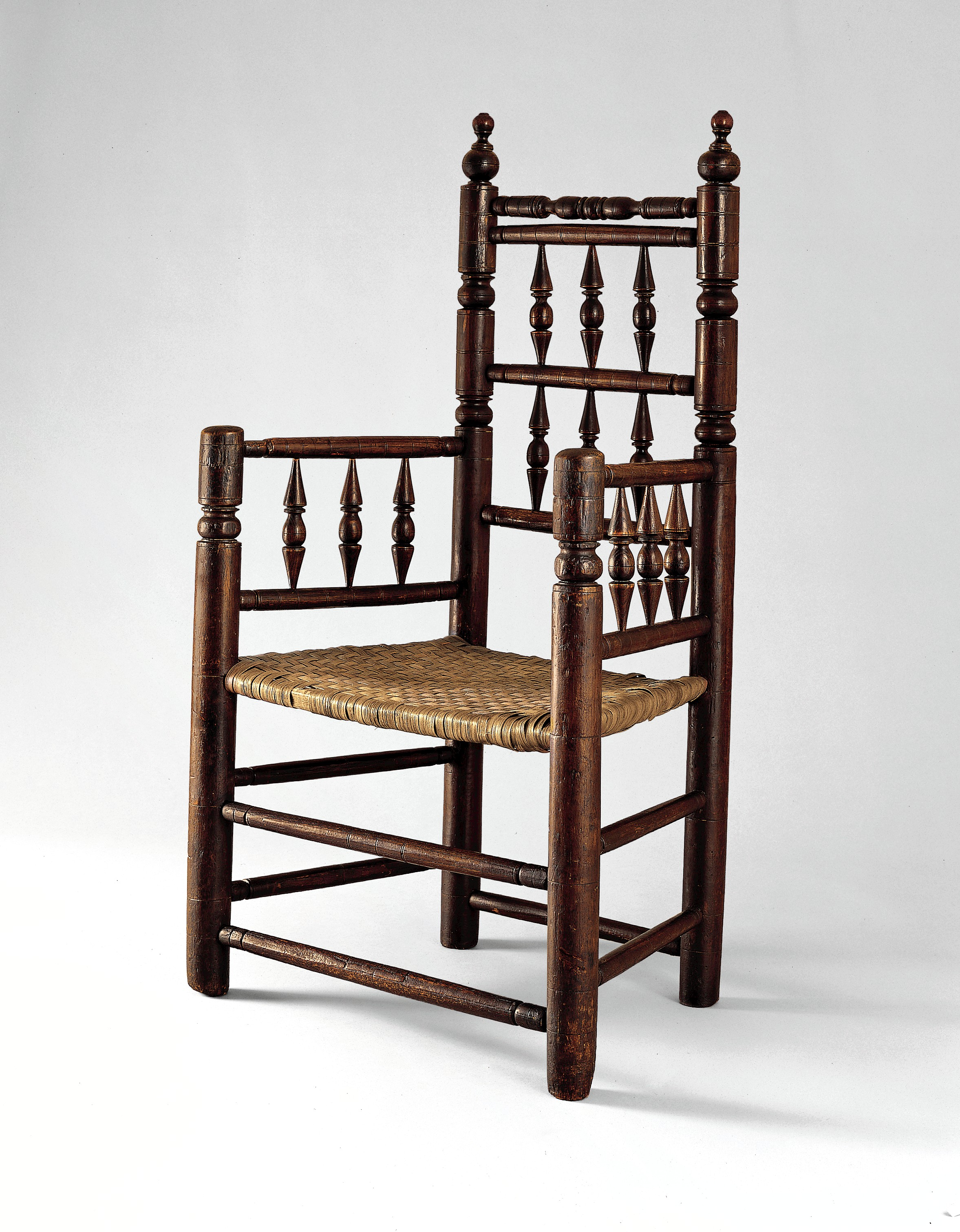
Turned Armchair, American, 1630–1700

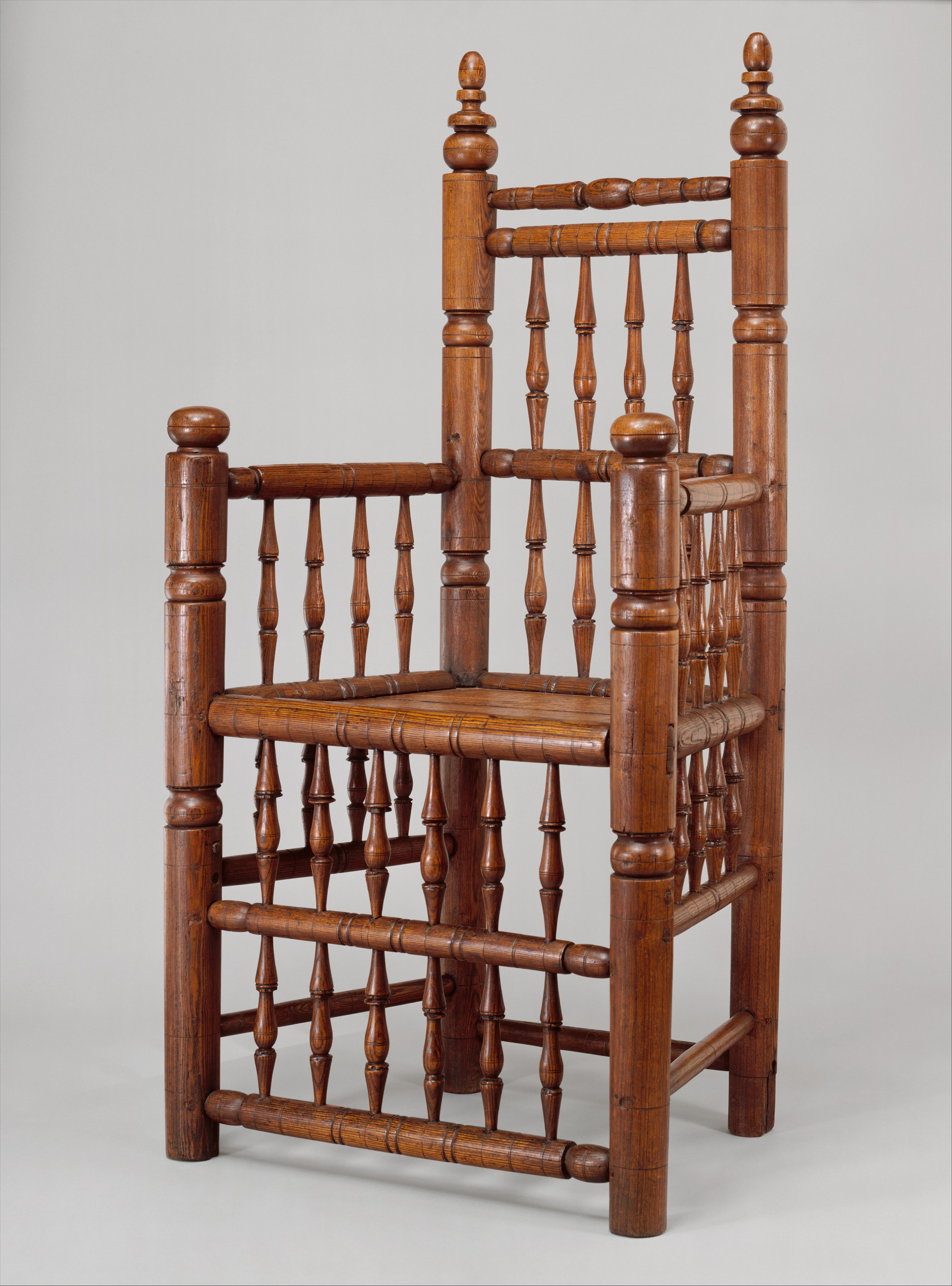
Spindle-back armchair, American, 1640–1680

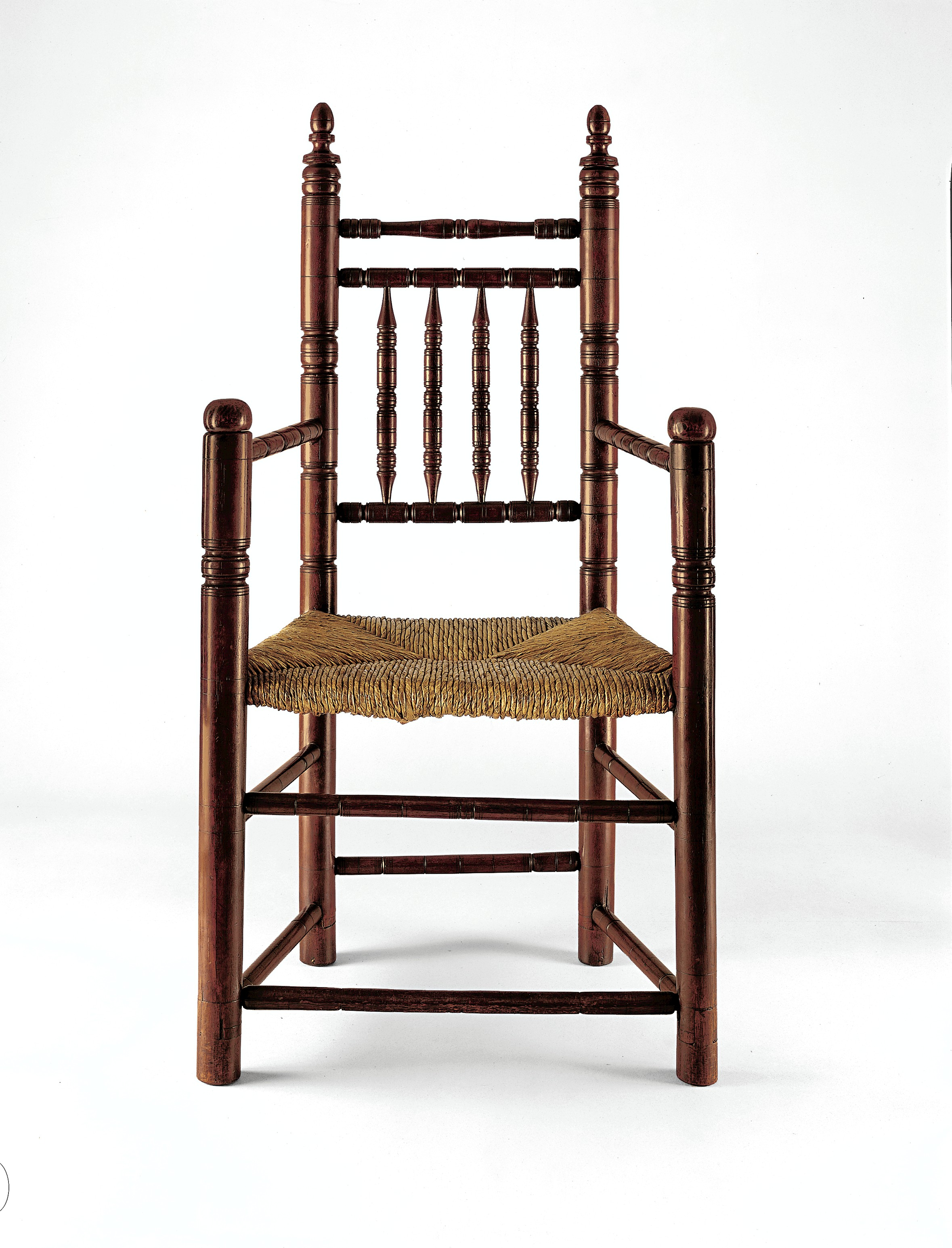
Turned Armchair, American, 1650–1700

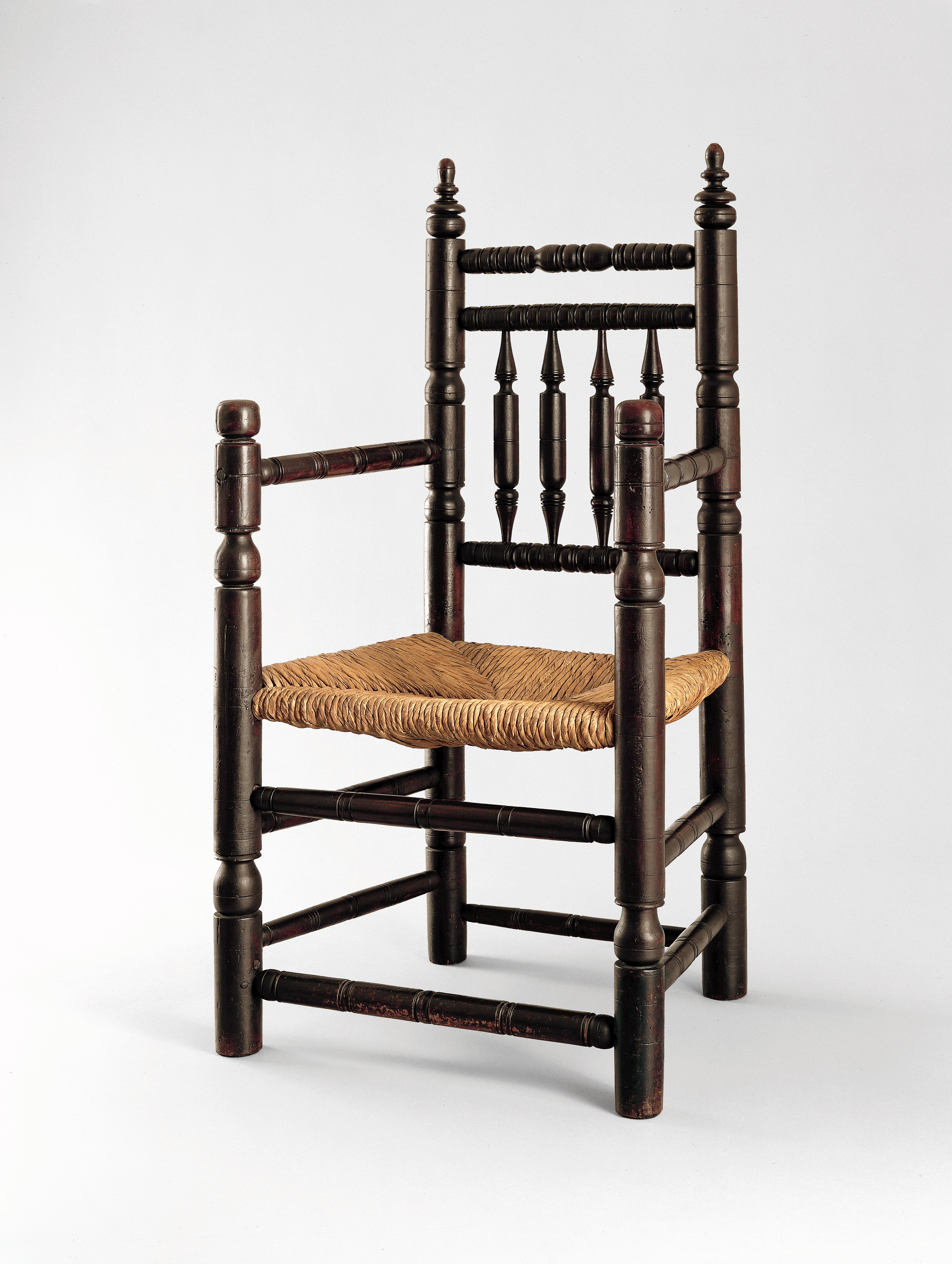
Spindle-back armchair, American, 1660–1700

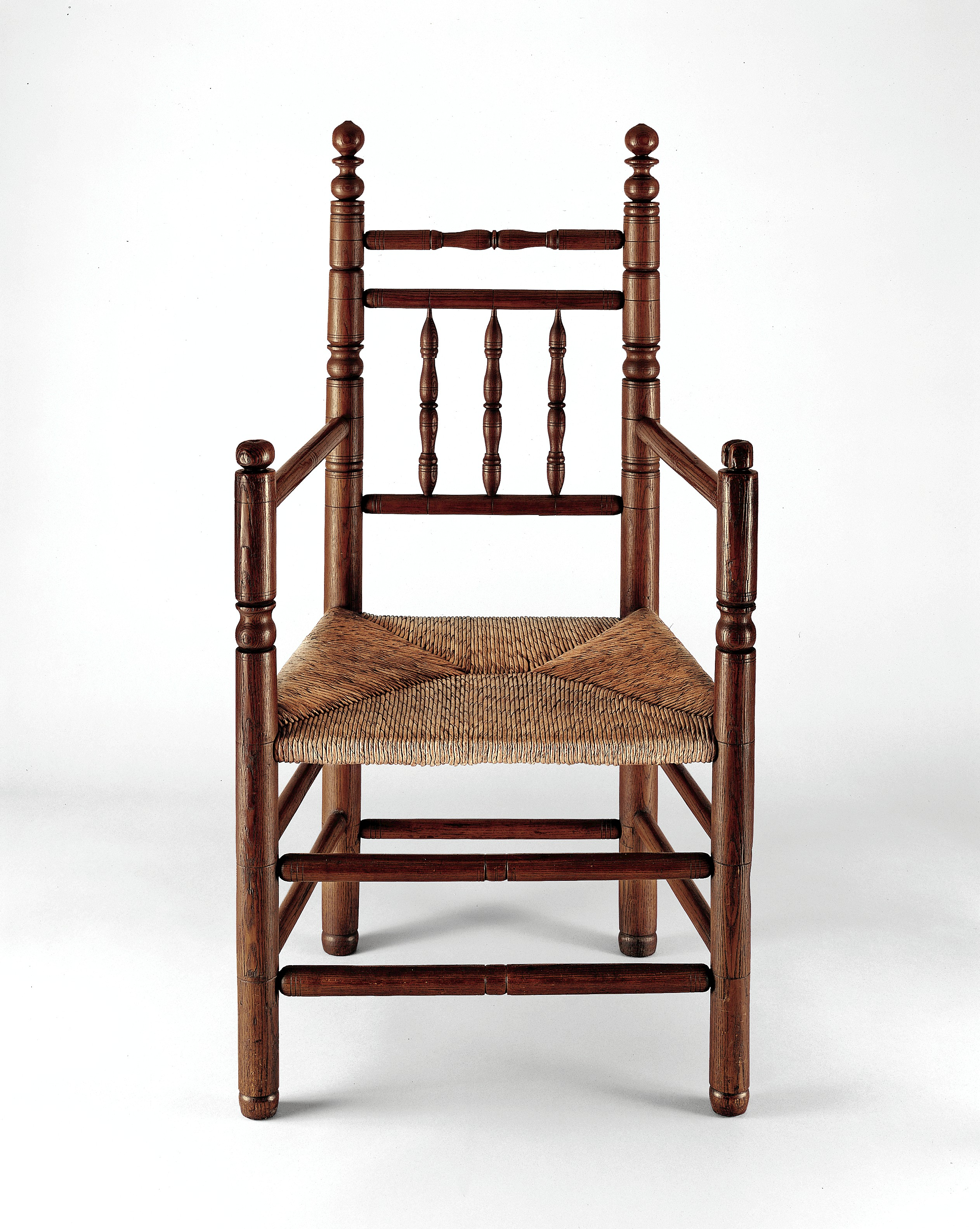
Spindle-back armchair, American, 1660–1700

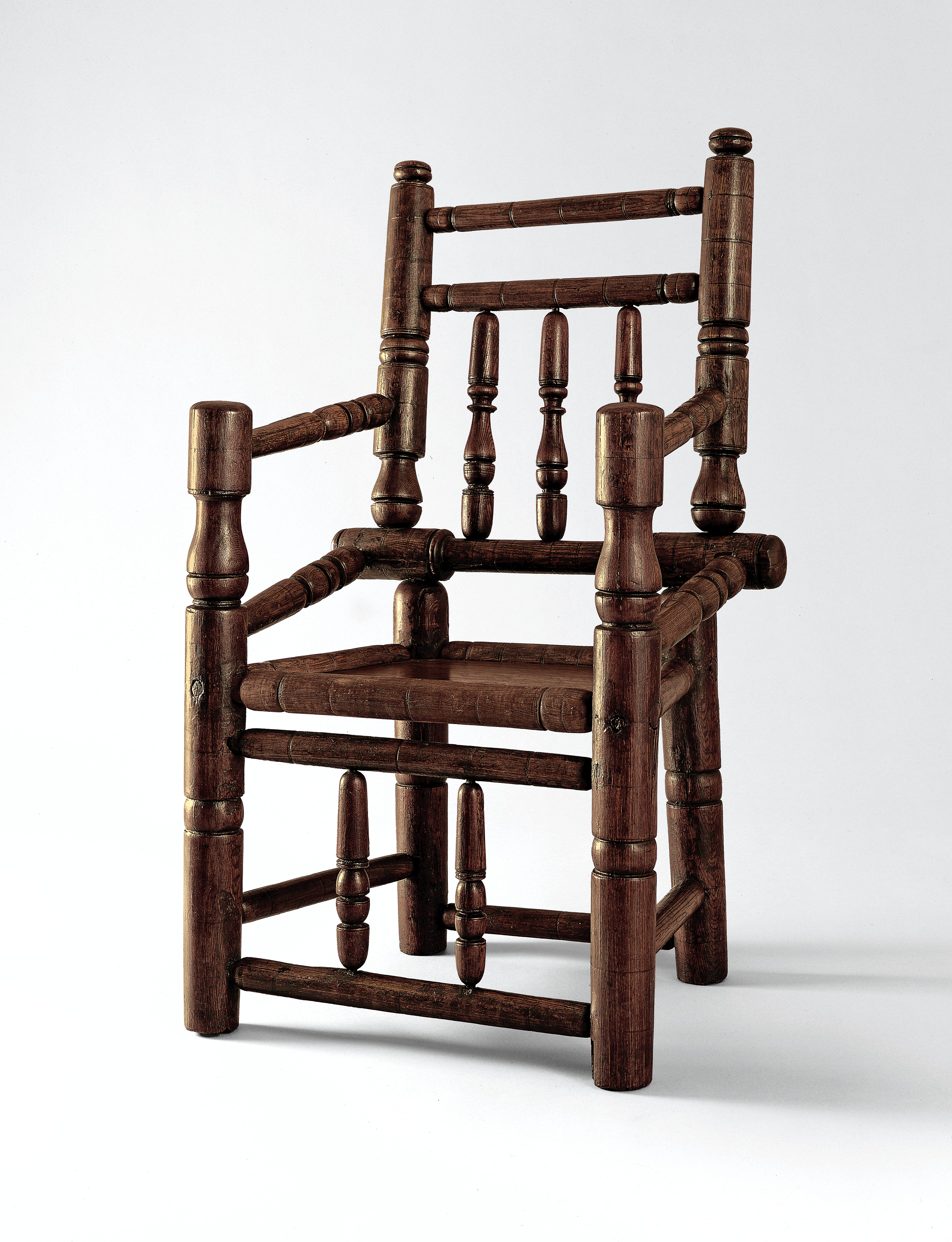
Turned armchair, American, 1665–1690

== See also ==
- List of chairs
- Shaker chair
- Mashrabiya, Arabic window latticing, often made by a similar turning process to bobbin-turned chairs
