= Sparrow Hawk (pinnace) =

17th century sailing ship

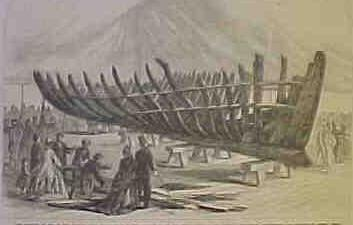
- Pinnace Sparrow-Hawk

History

England
- Name: Sparrow Hawk
- In service: June, 1626
- Out of service: July, 1626
- Stricken: Nauset Beach, Orleans, MA
- Home port: London, England
- Fate: wreck
- Status: Museum reconstruction.
- Notes: Hull reconstruction owned by Pilgrim Society, now on long term loan to Cape Cod Maritime Museum.

General characteristics Profile
- Type: pinnace
- Displacement: 30 tons
- Length: 40 ft (12 m)
- Beam: 12.83 ft (3.91 m)
- Draft: 9.63 ft (2.94 m)
- Speed: ? 2-7 knots
- Range: offshore, ocean
- Complement: 25
- Notes: "Sparrowhawk was small for trans-Atlantic voyage, but she did arrive in the New World after a 6 week voyage only to be wrecked on Cape Cod, Massachusetts.; Website: Loss of the Sparrow-Hawk in 1626

The Sparrow-Hawk was a 'small pinnace' similar to the full-rigged pinnace Virginia that sailed for the English Colonies in June 1626. She is the earliest ship to participate in the first decades of English settlement in the New World to have survived to the present day.

A rough, six-week voyage ended in a storm off Orleans, Massachusetts, on Cape Cod when the heavily loaded Sparrow-Hawk was driven onto the isolated Nauset Beach. All aboard survived and were removed to the nearby Plymouth Colony. Storms and shifting sand buried the wrecked pinnace within several weeks. Sparrow-Hawk remained buried until storms in May 1863 uncovered the hull, which was soon salvaged. Keel, planks, rudder and other hull elements from the Sparrow-Hawk were found in good condition, removed from the beach and carefully reconstructed for subsequent exhibition.

Several of the best naval architects of the 1860s in Boston collaborated on the reconstruction of Sparrow-Hawk, which received widespread exhibition during the next few years. Considerable information has been gleaned from the Sparrow Hawk about hull design and construction of the 'small' pinnace design of the early 17th century.

== Wrecked on Cape Cod ==
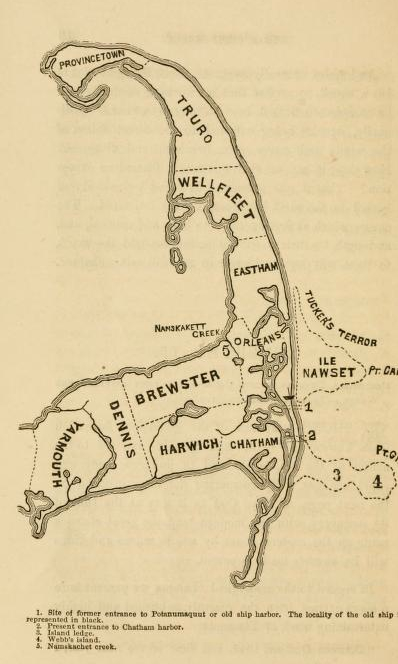
Wreck site of the Sparrow-Hawk in 1626 on Nauset Beach, Orleans, Massachusetts

The Sparrow-Hawk left London, June 1626 loaded with passengers for the Jamestown Colony and Virginia. Certainly, she was of a minimum size that any Company would choose to send across the Atlantic with settlers and passengers, many of whom would be unfamiliar with the great ocean and its sometimes violent weather.

After six weeks, the Sparrow-Hawk reached the coast of Massachusetts, and was wrecked at Potanumaquut Harbor Cape Cod. Upon reaching Cape Cod, the Sparrow-Hawk no longer had fresh water or 'beer'. Captain Johnston was in his cabin, sick and lame with scurvy. At night, the Sparrow-Hawk hit a sand bar but the water was smooth and she laid out an anchor. The morning revealed that the caulking between hull planks – oakum – had been driven out. High winds drove the Sparrow-Hawk over the bar and into the harbor. Many goods were rescued and there were no deaths.

Two survivors were guided to William Bradford and the Plymouth Colony by two Indians who spoke English. A shallop with Governor Bradford and supplies to repair the Sparrow-Hawk was sent to rescue the crew. Sparrow-Hawk was repaired and set to sea with cargo. However, yet another violent storm drove her onshore, and render her condition beyond repair. Mariners and passengers removed to the Plymouth Colony. There, they were housed and fed for nine months before joining two vessels headed down the coast to Virginia.

Sparrow-Hawk was buried in the sand and marsh mud of an Orleans, Massachusetts, beach that came to be known as "Old Ship Harbor". Her 'grave' was a low-oxygen environment, which greatly aided preservation of hull timbers, which were described as devoid of worms and barnacles. All metal fastenings had disappeared through oxidation. Her keel and hull timbers were visible from time to time when high winds shifted sand on the beach. Visitors were struck by the long "tail-like" projection from the stern. Although a single fierce storm in this area can move sand to a depth of six feet, it is judged that it took several years for the Sparrow-Hawk to be completely buried. Her burial site retained the name Old Ship Harbor into the late 19th century.

== Rediscovery ==
In 1863, a great storm that occurred between May 4 and May 6 uncovered a great deal of the hull. It was discovered by Solomon Linnell and Alfred Rogers of Orleans. On May 9, Leander Crosby visited the Sparrow-Hawk and removed several artifacts. The rudder was few feet distant from the hull and it was removed, studied and re-assembled. By August 1863, Sparrow-Hawk was once again buried beneath the surface for a few months after which she was exposed once again, and then removed above the high water mark.

Interest in the Sparrow-Hawk wreck was intense because it was immediately understood that this was the earliest ship wreck known from the years during which the New England Colonies were first 'planted'. Controversy immediately erupted as the hull was reconstructed. Keel, hull planks and rudder had been preserved by beach sand for more than two centuries.

"Considering that even in 1863 the timbers existed only to a height of four feet, one can wonder how Dolliver and Sleeper could have been sure that she had a sheer – the fore-and-aft curve of the deck – of "two and one-half feet, with a lively rise at both ends." Their knowledge of ancient rigging was such that they stated, "The rig common to a vessel of her size at the time she was built consisted of a single mast with a lateen yard and a triangular sail." There is no evidence that English vessels of the early seventeenth century ever carried such a single-masted rig." The English ship of the period whose known dimensions are nearest to those of the Sparrow-Hawk is one built at Rye, East Sussex, England, in 1609. Her keel was 33' long, breadth amidships was 16.5' and depth was 11'. Extrapolating these dimensions to the "Sparrow-Hawk", reduces her depth to 8'.

== Design ==
Hull lines of the Sparrow-Hawk as drafted by John Lawlor, c. 1864

As submitted by Dolliver & Sleeper - "Only a practised mechanical eye could detect a little inequality in her sides, in consequence of her having had a heel to port. We have replaced the keel, sternpost, stern-knee, part of the keelson, all the floor timbers, most of the first futtocks and the garboard strake on the starboard side; but the stem and fore-foot, the top timbers and deck are gone. Enough of her, however, remains to enable us to form a fair estimate of her general outline when complete.

The model made by D. J. Lawlor, Esq., embodies our idea of her form and size." . . "Her forward lines are convex, her after lines sharp and concave, and her midship section is almost the arc of a circle. . . "She had a square stern, and no doubt bulwarks as far forward as the waist; but the outline of the rest of her decks was probably protected by an open rail." Sailing ballast indicated a deeper hull than what was reconstructed, or a ship that was heavily sparred. Grooved floor timbers reveal that timber ropes were present.

Dennison J. Lawlor was a famous Boston Naval architect who produced a line plan in which the Sparrow-Hawk had two masts. The forward mast carried a single square sail, the mizzen mast (after mast) carried a lateen sail. It was decided by a 'Mr. Sanders' to use Lawlor's plan but reduce the depth to about 8'. Common arcs of circles replaced the sheer line with "lively rise" at both ends. Paintings of small square stern ships of this period show an overhang aft, instead of a flat transom, with an outboard rudder as drawn by Lawlor. Sander's rig takes into account the mast step, and thereby reduced the rig to two possibilities: 'simple' three masted; or the two-masted, square rig known in the 17th century ships as a Barque.

Reconstructed hull of the Sparrow-Hawk on the 'Commons', Boston, Massachusetts

In 1980, Baker summed up the difficulties and potential confusion when assessing a ship as a potential pinnace candidate. There is no consensus as to what type of ship should be assigned to the Sparrow-Hawk. Decked and with a square stern, she cannot be a shallop. Baker believes her too chunky to be a pinnace, others call her a 'ketch' but this author goes with the department of Nautical Archeology at Texas A&M University that assigns "Sparrow-Hawk" to the pinnace category, and representative of the 'small pinnace' design in contrast to the 'large pinnace' type.

== Exhibitions ==
The reconstructed Sparrow-Hawk hull was exhibited in several cities, including on Boston Common in 1865, and then given to the Pilgrim Society in 1889 and exhibited for over a hundred years at the Pilgrim Hall Museum. The Sparrow-Hawk hull was on extended loan to the Cape Cod Maritime Museum on the harborside in Hyannis, Massachusetts, but has since been returned to the Pilgrim Hall Museum where it is in storage. The timbers are undergoing further research cooperating with maritime archaeologists of SEAMAHP.org and experts in 17th-century ships and dendrochronology. The shipwreck is scheduled for display again soon.

== Bibliography ==
- Mathew Baker and the Art of the Shipwright (in German). Baker was royal ship builder under Elizabeth I. "His Fragments of Ancient Shipbuilding (1586) is considered a ground breaking work and invaluable for the study of 16th century shipbuilding". Sept.15, 2005. Chapter 3 (pp. 107–165) of Stephen Johnston, Making mathematical practice: gentlemen, practitioners and artisans in Elizabethan England (Ph.D. Cambridge, 1994). See also Mathew Baker.
- Sparrow Hawk Ye antient wrecke.--1626. Loss of the Sparrow-Hawk in 1626, by Charles W. Livermore and Leander Crosby, Alfred Mudge & Son: Boston: 1865.
- An account of the discovery of an ancient ship on the eastern shore of Cape Cod (1864), by Amos Otis, Albany: J.Munsell 1864.
