= Brewster Chair =

Style of chair formerly made in New England

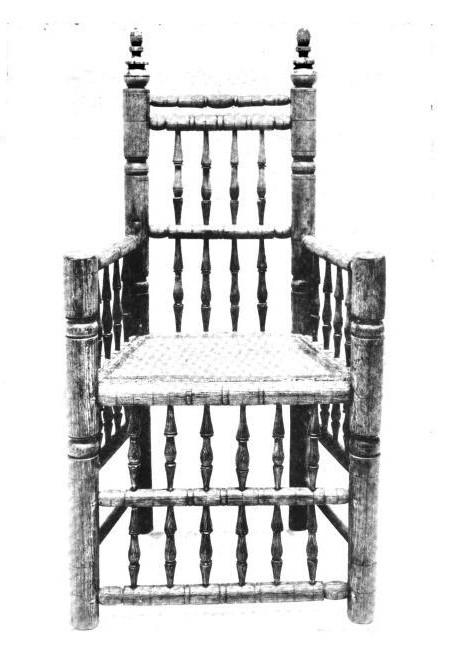
A 17th-century Brewster Chair

The Pilgrim Hall Museum owns the original Elder Brewster Chair and Peregrine White cradle.

A Brewster Chair is a style of turned chair made in mid-17th-century New England.

== Origin ==
The "Brewster Chair" was named after William Brewster, one of the Pilgrim fathers who landed in Plymouth, Massachusetts in 1620. In 1830, the Brewster family of Duxbury donated Elder Brewster's original chair to Pilgrim Hall Museum in Plymouth, where it remains today. His chair was created in New England between 1630 and 1660 of American white ash. Other similar New England chairs from the 17th century have been named after this piece.

In the 1970s, Rhode Island sculptor Armand LaMontagne produced a notorious fake Brewster Chair that fooled the national experts at the Henry Ford Museum, which acquired the piece.
