= Pilgrim Hall Museum =

Coordinates: 41°57′32″N 70°40′04″W

- Pilgrim Hall
- U.S. National Register of Historic Places
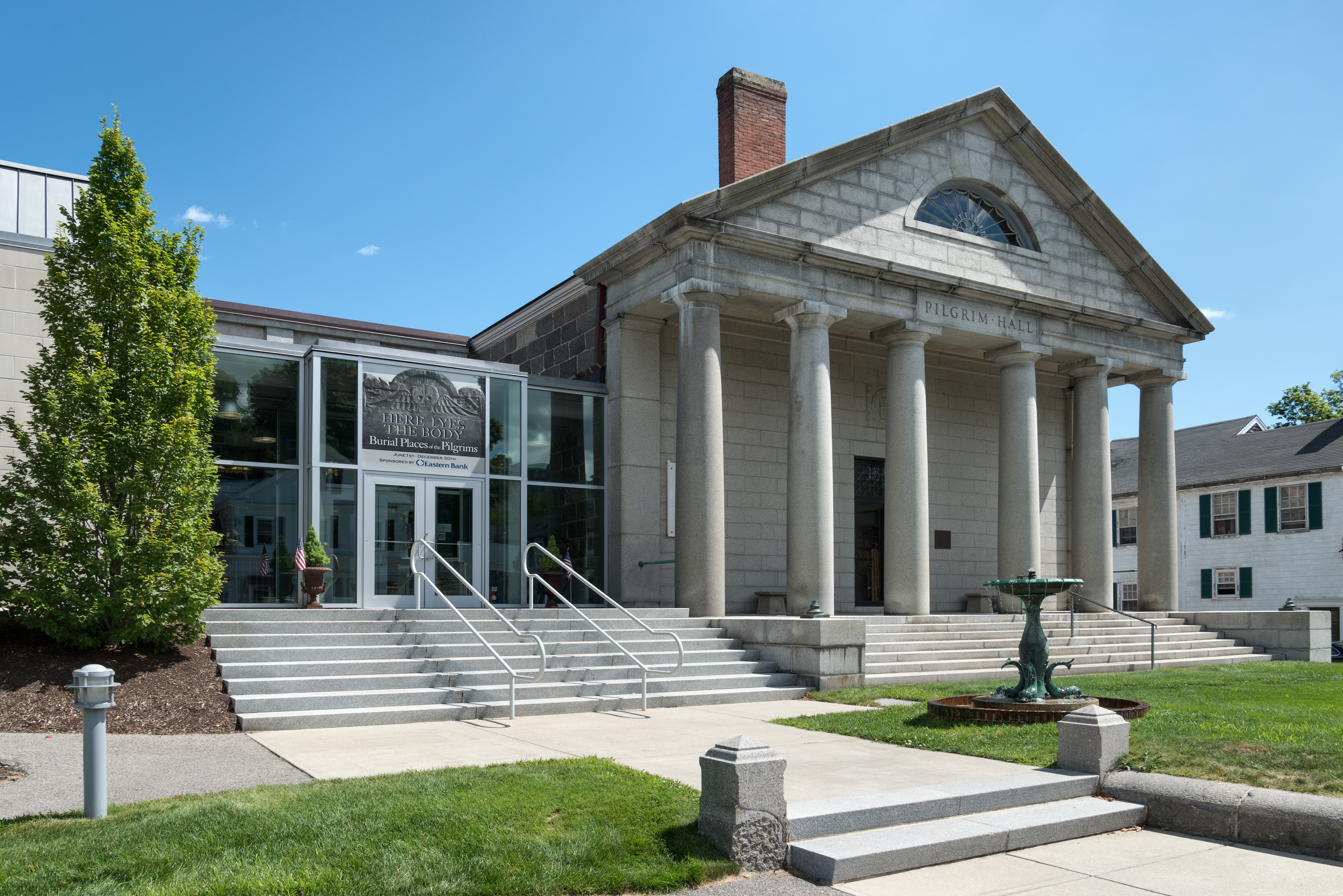
- Pilgrim Hall Museum, the oldest public museum in the United States
- Location: 75 Court St; Plymouth, Massachusetts
- Architect: Alexander Parris
- Architectural style: Greek Revival
- NRHP reference No.: 72001298
- Added to NRHP: April 11, 1972

The Pilgrim Hall Museum at 75 Court Street in Plymouth, Massachusetts is the oldest public museum in the United States in continuous operation, having opened in 1824.

== History ==
The Pilgrim Society, established in 1820, runs the museum. The museum tells the story of the Pilgrims and Plymouth Colony. Architect Alexander Parris designed the museum building, which is built of Quincy granite and opened in 1824. Russell Warren constructed a wooden portico in 1834, which had Doric columns supporting a triangular pediment. The museum was extensively upgraded in the 1880s, and a library wing added in 1904. In 1922 the original wooden portico was replaced by the present six-column Greek Revival temple front, which was designed by McKim Mead & White. In 2008, an addition was added to the museum along with a new sign, activities, and advertising throughout the downtown area. Its building was listed on the National Register of Historic Places in 1972.

== Collections ==
The Pilgrim Hall Museum contains artifact collections, artwork, a library, and archives. Prominent pieces include original Pilgrim era artifacts, such as the original Brewster Chair and a 1651 portrait of Edward Winslow, the only known contemporaneous Pilgrim portrait. The museum owns the remnants of the Sparrow Hawk, the only known remains of a trans-Atlantic 17th-century ship, which wrecked off of Cape Cod in 1626. The Sparrow Hawk remnants are currently in storage. The top part of Plymouth Rock sat in front of the building from the 1830s to the 1880s, when it was reunited with the bottom half in the Plymouth waterfront. A portion of the Rock was retained at the museum where visitors are currently permitted to touch it.

== Gallery ==
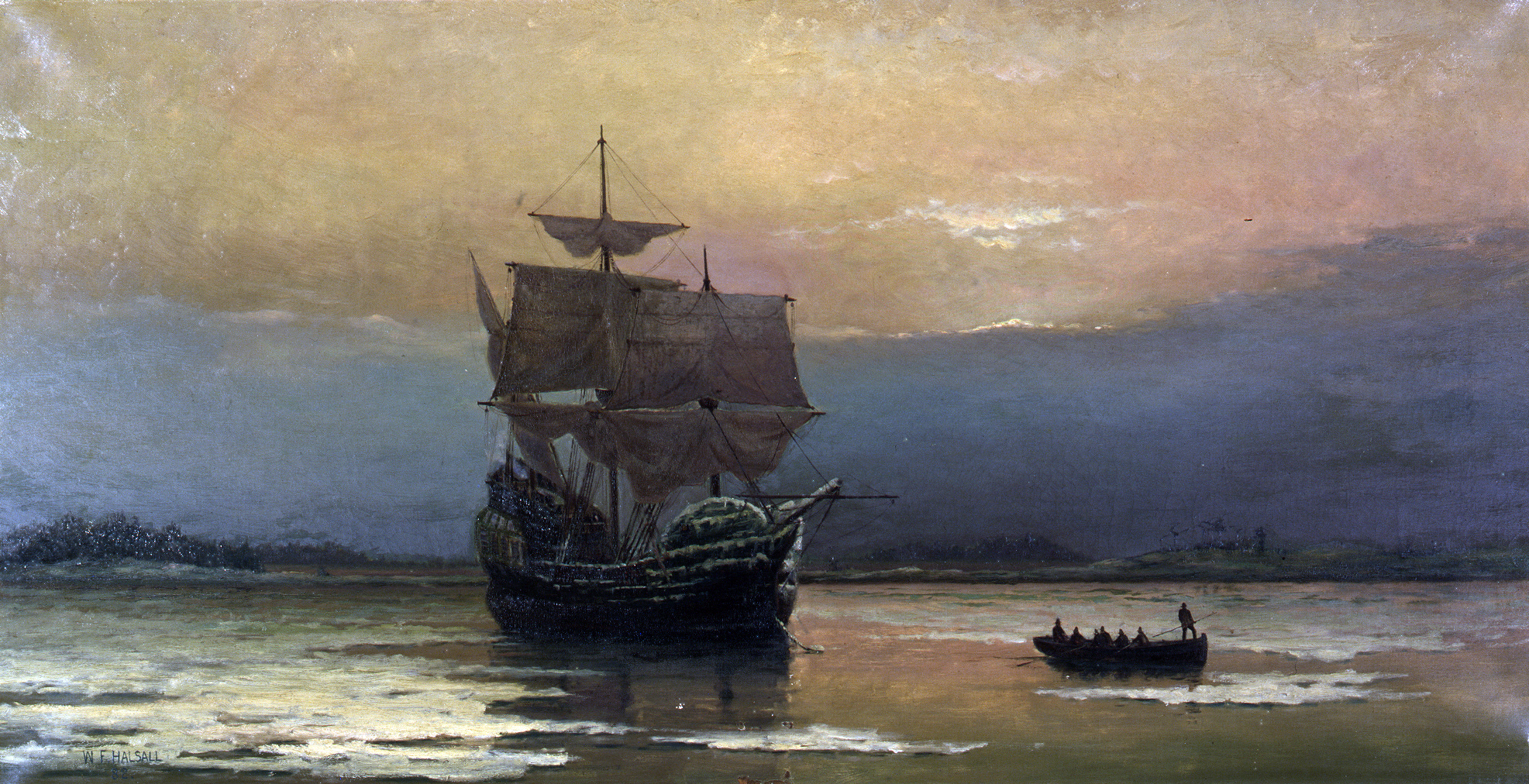
Mayflower in Plymouth Harbor, by William Halsall, 1882.

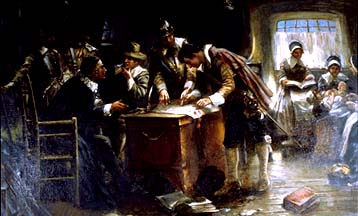
Signing the Mayflower Compact, by Edward Percy Moran, c. 1900, is now in the collection of the Pilgrim Hall Museum

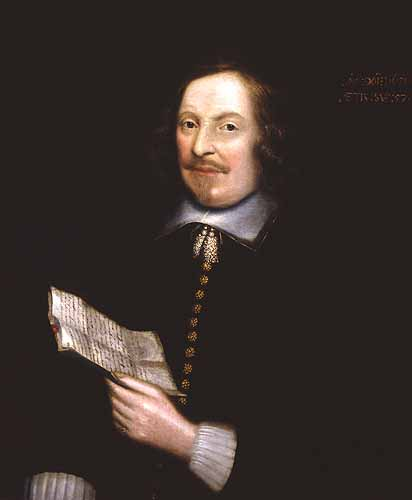
The museum's 1651 portrait of Edward Winslow, the only known portrait of a Pilgrim painted from life

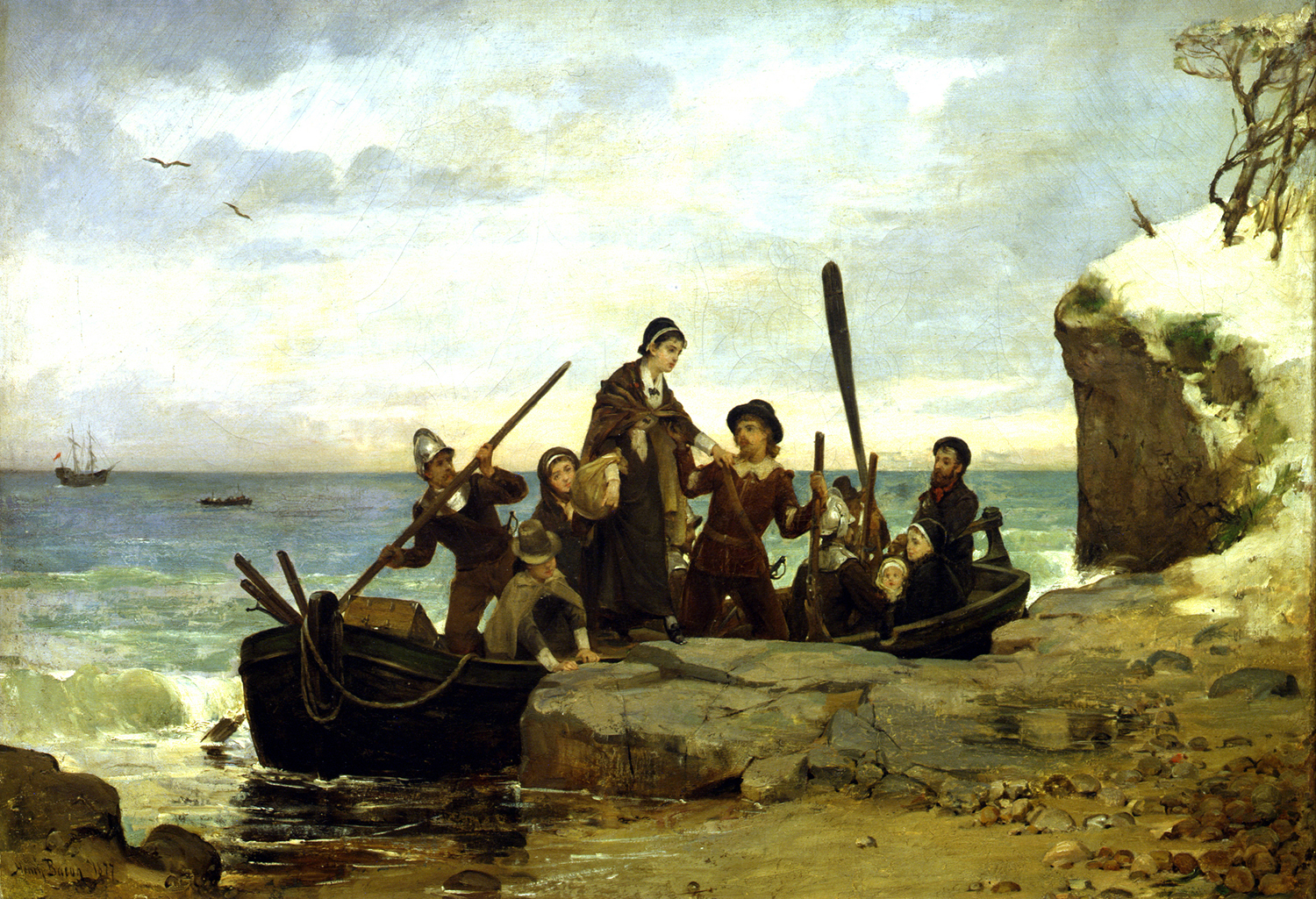
The museum owns The Landing of the Pilgrims. by Henry A. Bacon, 1877

The museum owns the original Elder Brewster Chair and Peregrine White cradle

Pilgrim Museum in 1910 postcard

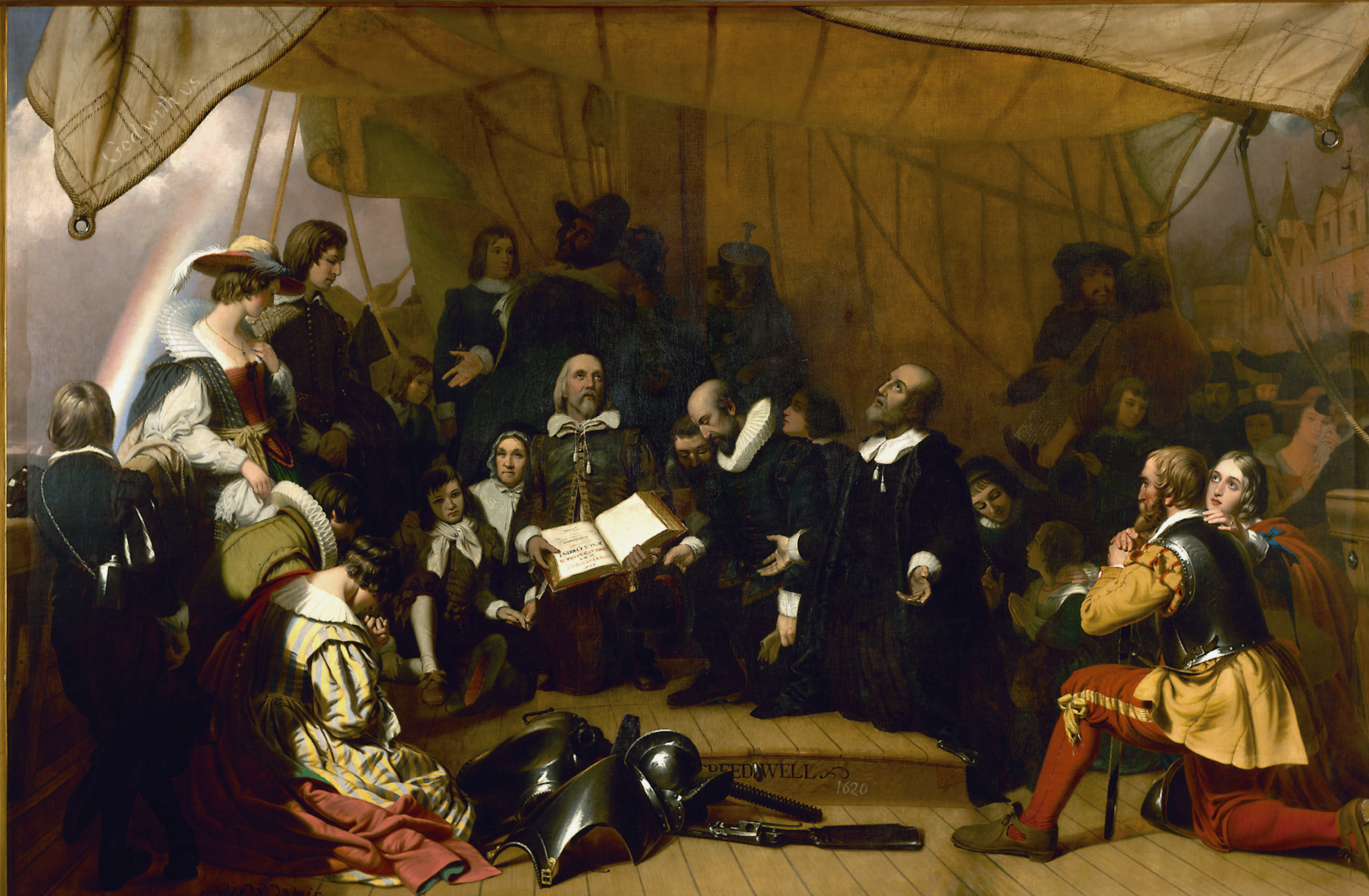
Embarkation of the Pilgrims by Robert Weir, a copy is also located in the United States Capitol rotunda, Washington, DC

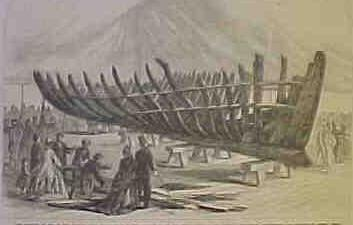
The 1626 Sparrow-Hawk wreck is displayed at the museum

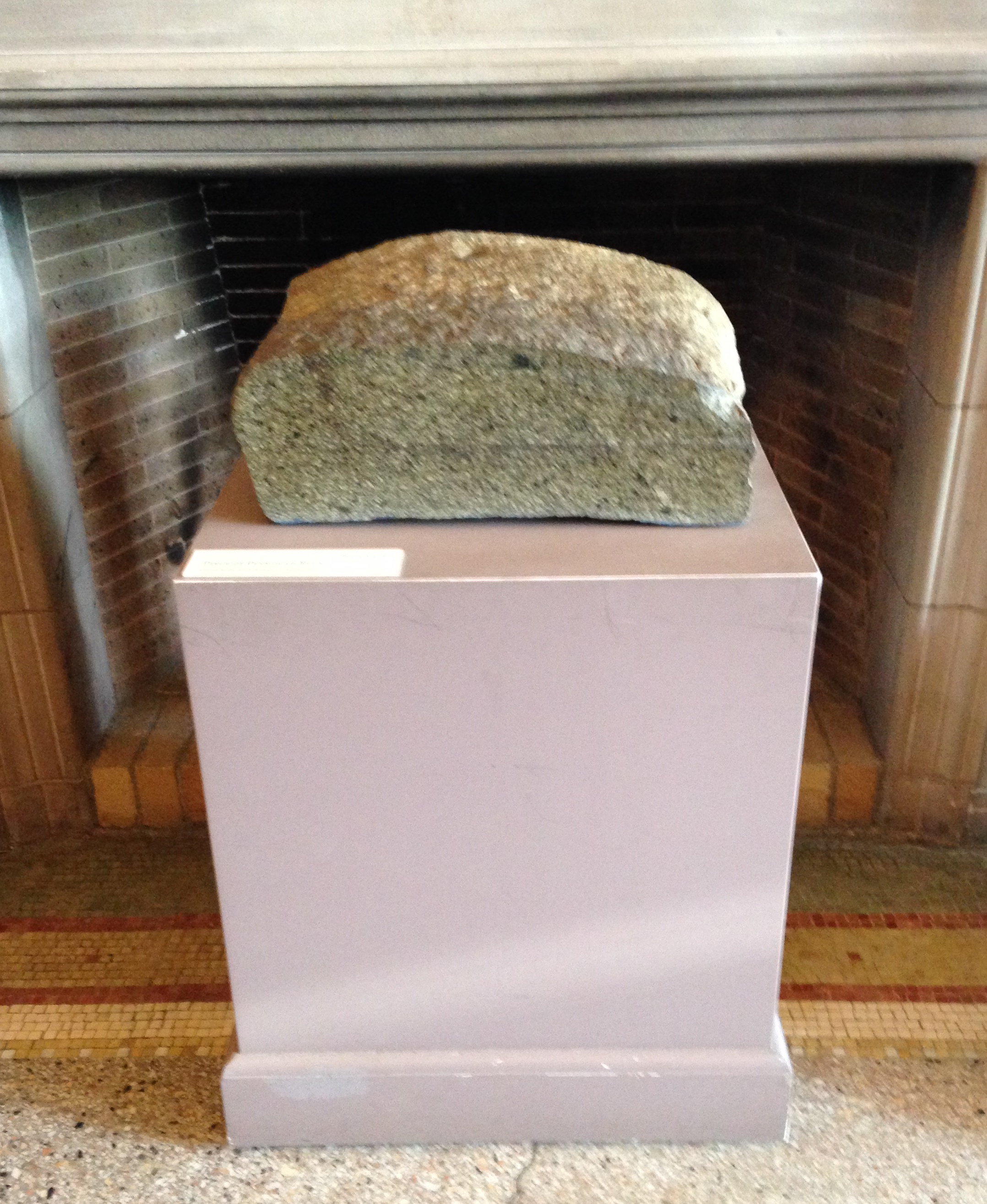
A portion of Plymouth Rock on display at the museum

== See also ==
- National Register of Historic Places listings in Plymouth County, Massachusetts
