= Siddhasana =

Ancient seated meditation posture in hatha yoga

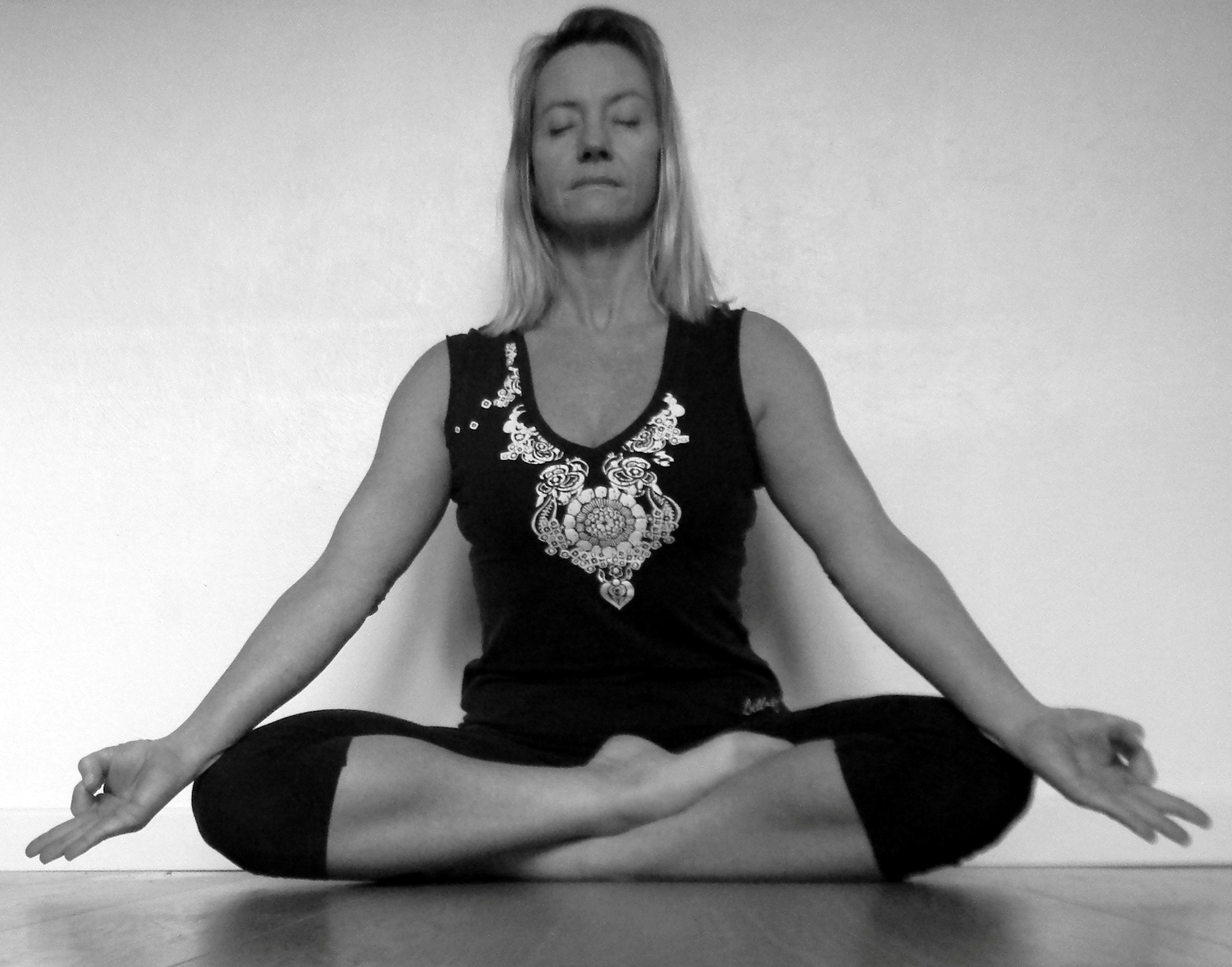
Siddhasana

Siddhasana (Sanskrit: सिद्धासन; IAST: siddhāsana) or Accomplished Pose is an ancient seated asana in hatha yoga and modern yoga as exercise suitable for meditation. The names Muktasana (Sanskrit: मुक्तासन, Liberated Pose) and Burmese position are sometimes given to the same pose, sometimes to an easier variant, Ardha Siddhasana. Svastikasana has each foot tucked as snugly as possible into the fold of the opposite knee.

Siddhasana is one of the oldest asanas. It is described as a meditation seat in the early Hatha Yoga text, the 10th century Goraksha Sataka. This states that Siddhasana ranks alongside Padmasana (lotus position) as the most important of the asanas, opening the way to liberation. The 15th-century Hatha Yoga Pradipika similarly suggests that all other asanas are unnecessary once Siddhasana has been mastered.

== Etymology ==
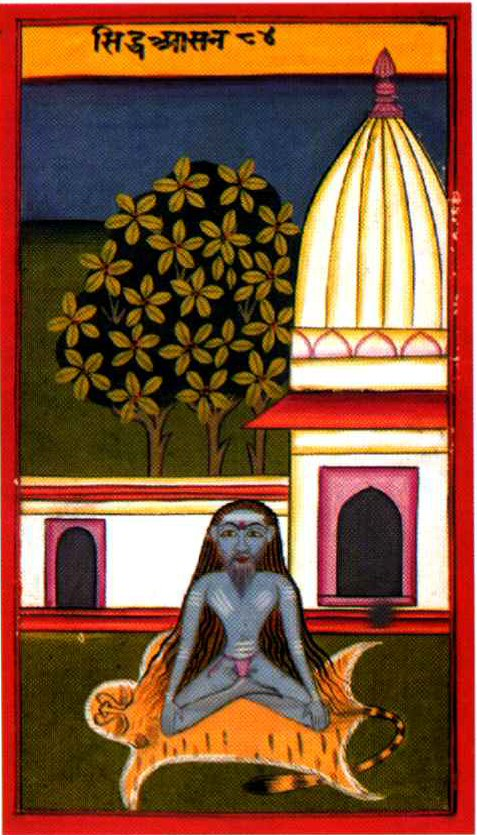
Siddhasana in the 19th century Jogapradipika. The yogin is meditating on a tiger skin.

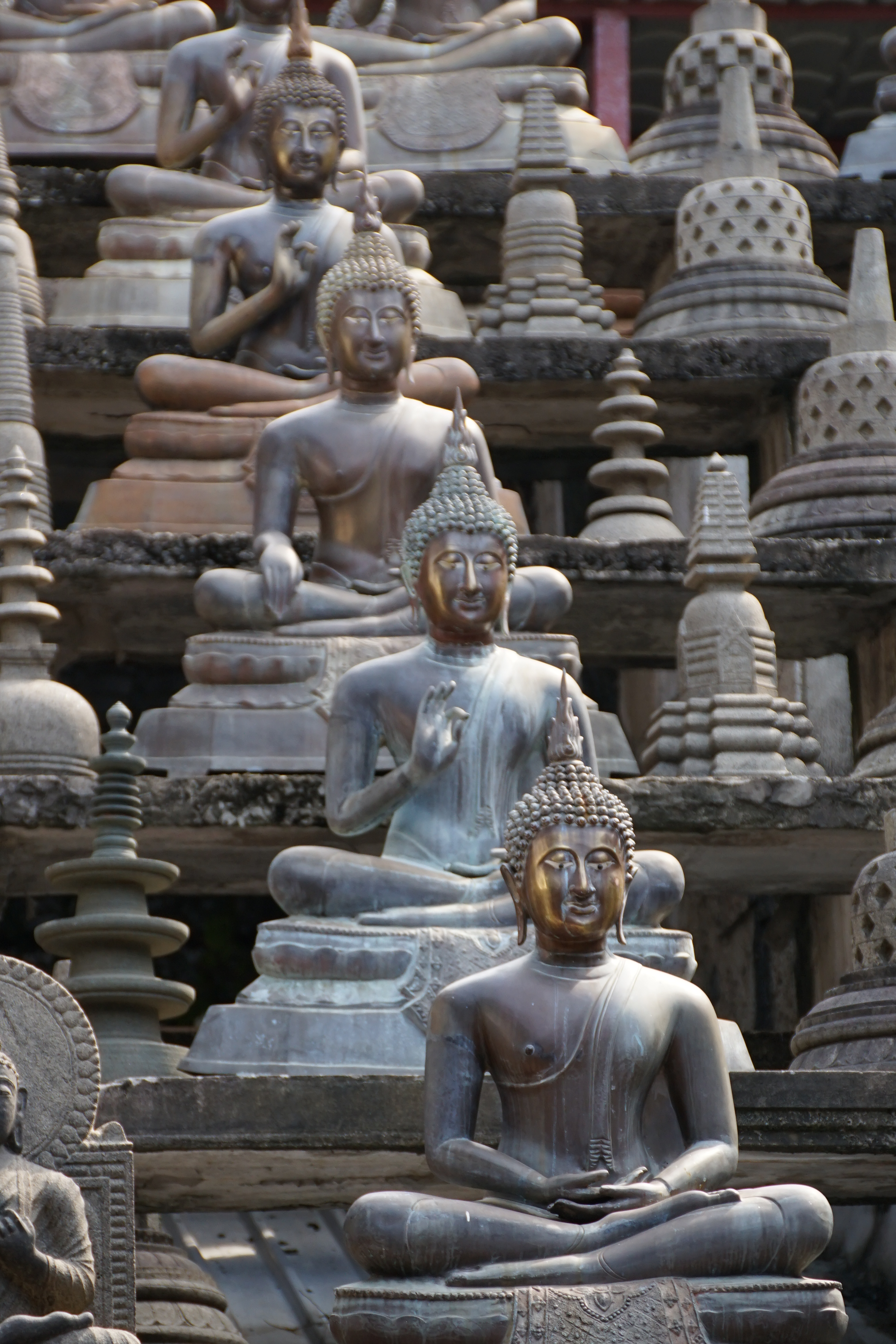
Statues of Buddha at Gangaramaya Temple, Colombo, Sri Lanka

The name comes from the Sanskrit words siddha (सिद्ध) meaning both "perfect" and "adept", and āsana (आसन) meaning "posture" or "seat". The name Muktasana comes from मुक्त mukta meaning "liberation". Ann Swanson writes that the pose is called accomplished as it was the goal of all other asanas to ready the body to sit in meditation in this way.

The name Svastikasana is from the Sanskrit svastika (स्वस्तिक) meaning "auspicious". The posture is described in the eighth century Pātañjalayogaśāstravivaraṇa and in the tenth century Vimānārcanākalpa, where it is a meditation seat.

== History ==
=== Medieval ===
Siddhasana is one of the oldest asanas, being described as a meditation seat in the 10th century Goraksha Sataka 1.10-12. It states that along with lotus position, Siddhasana is the most important of the asanas (1.10), breaking open the door of liberation (1.11).

The 15th century Hatha Yoga Pradipika 1.37–45 praises the asana, implying it is the only one that practitioners would need, asking "When Siddhasana is mastered, of what use are the various other postures?" It describes Siddhasana as "the opener of the door of salvation" and "the chief of all asanas", explaining that this is because the posture "cleanses the impurities of 72,000 nadis", channels of the subtle body.

The 17th century Gheranda Samhita 2.7 states in terms similar to the earlier texts that "the practitioner who has subdued his passions, having placed one heel at the anal aperture should keep the other heel on the root of the generative organ; afterwards he should rest his chin upon the chest, and being quiet and straight, gaze at the spot between the two eyebrows. This is called the Siddhasana which leads to emancipation".

=== Modern ===
Siddhasana is traditionally used for dhyana (meditation) and pranayama (breath exercises). The early Western student of Hatha Yoga, Theos Bernard, wrote that he practised the meditation asanas after the others (that he called the reconditioning asanas) so as to gain the flexibility to do them easily. He stated that he used only Padmasana (lotus position) and Siddhasana.

In his 1966 book Light on Yoga, B. K. S. Iyengar quotes several scriptures, stating that the yogin who contemplates Atman and practises Siddhasana for 12 years obtains the yoga siddhis, supernatural powers; and that once the pose is mastered, samadhi follows "without effort". In the Yoga Sutras of Patañjali, Edwin F. Bryant quotes Śaṅkara's verse, among others from a survey of scriptures and commentaries, stating that mastery of postures does not produce the goals of yoga; only getting rid of the Kleshas obstacle to yoga, and samadhi, undeviated absorption on the object of meditation, can produce the goals of yoga.

== Description ==
From a seated position, one heel is brought to press on the perineum with the sole of the foot flat against the inner thigh. The body sits on top of this heel. Adjustments are made until the body is comfortable and the pressure is firmly applied. Then the opposite ankle is placed over the first, so the ankle bones are touching and the heels are above one another with the top heel pressing the pubis directly above the genitals. The genitals will then lie in between the two heels. The toes and outer edge of the top foot are pushed down into the space between the calf and thigh muscles. The toes of the bottom foot are pulled up into the similar space on the opposite side. The spine is held erect. A small meditation cushion or zafu is sometimes used to help align the back vertically. The same pose for women is sometimes called Siddha Yoni Asana.

== Variations ==
Muktasana, Liberation Pose, is either exactly the same as Siddhasana, as stated in the 15th century Hatha Yoga Pradipika, or a variant with the feet close in to the perineum but resting on the ground, that is, left foot touches the perineum, and the right foot is close to the left foot, but resting on the ground. This variant is sometimes called Ardha Siddhasana (Sanskrit अर्ध ardha, half), and much easier for beginners. Both variants are sometimes called Burmese position when used for meditation.

Svastikasana has each foot tucked as snugly as possible into the fold of the opposite knee.

Sukhasana, Easy Pose, has the legs crossed at mid-calf. The pose can be supported by sitting on a cushion.

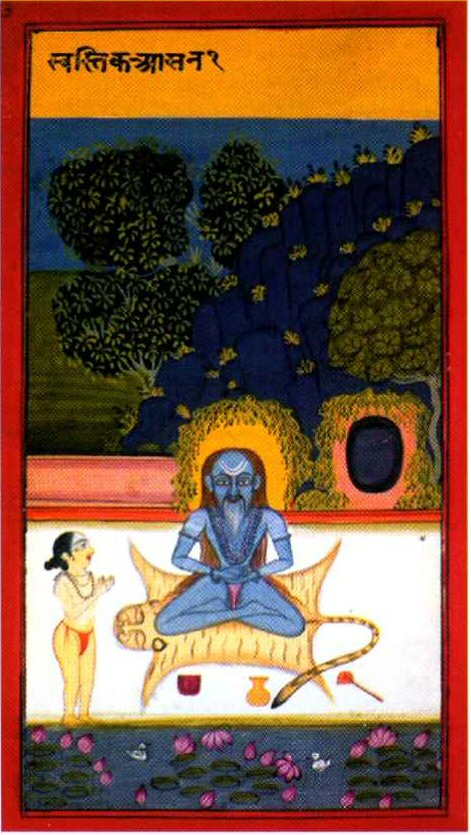
Svastikasana in the 19th century Jogapradipika

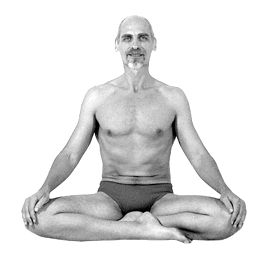
Muktasana, easier variant with feet on ground, useful for meditation

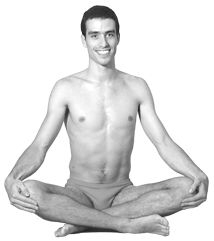
Sukhasana, easy pose

== See also ==
- List of asanas
