= Uzbek Napramach =

It's viewed as a symbol wellness and cleanliness

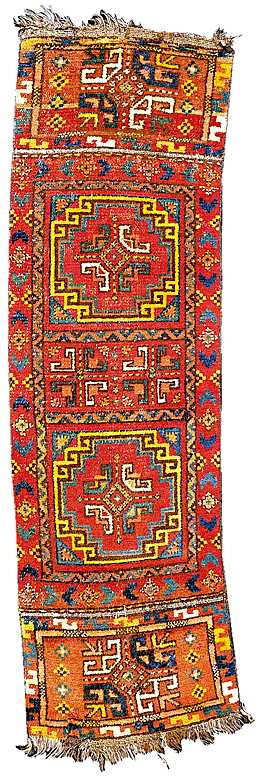
An Uzbek Napramach, late 19th century. Size: about 130 x 40 cm.

Uzbek Napramach is a type of rug that was made primarily in Uzbekistan in the late 19th century. Napramach is the Uzbek word for a small bag, and the rug is typically used as a mat to sit upon. In use, it is very similar to the Balisht of the Baluch or the Pushti used in Iran, and it also shows a resemblance to the Yastik rug of Turkey.

The Uzbek Napramach was used particularly by nomads in the mountains of Uzbekistan — both as a cushion, owing to its thick texture, and as a mat.
