= Washitsu =

Japanese room with tatami flooring

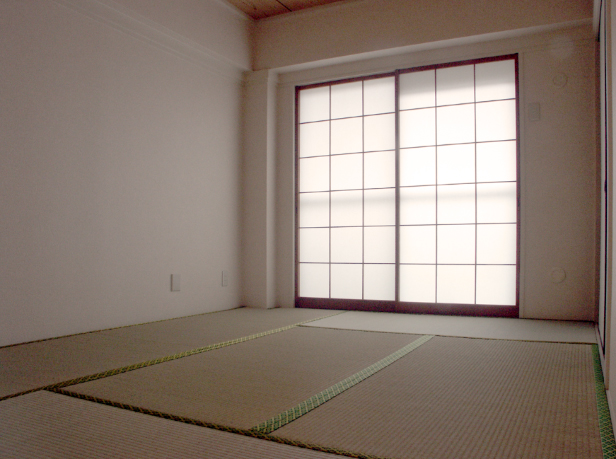
This washitsu has tatami flooring and shoji (doors).

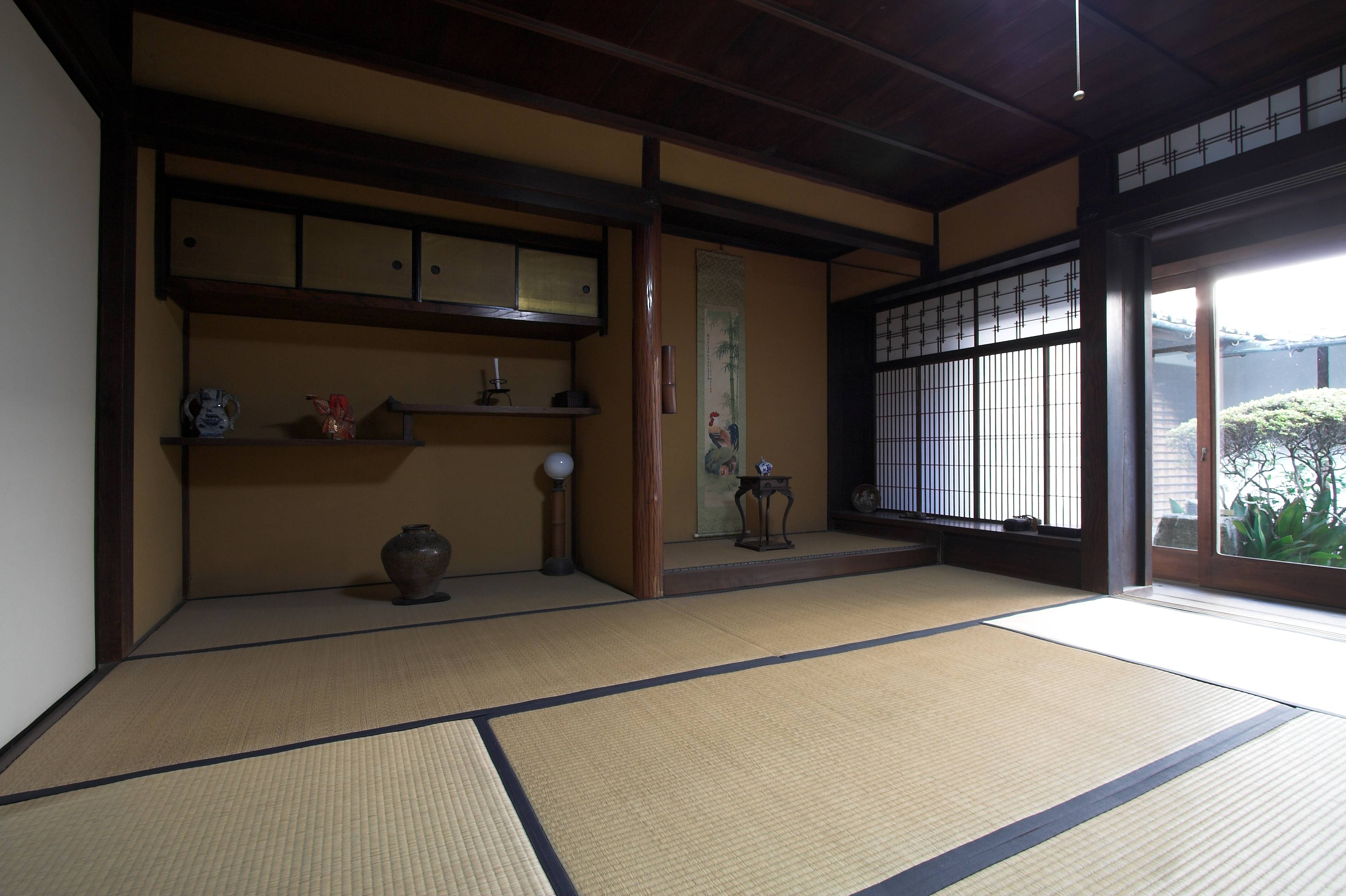
A traditional washitsu

A washitsu (和室), meaning "Japanese-style room(s)", and frequently called a "tatami room" in English, is a Japanese room with traditional tatami flooring. Washitsu also usually have sliding doors (fusuma), rather than hinged doors between rooms. They may have shōji and, if the particular room is meant to serve as a reception room for guests, it may have a tokonoma (alcove for decorative items).

Traditionally, most rooms in a Japanese dwelling were in washitsu style. However, many modern Japanese houses have only one washitsu, which is sometimes used for entertaining guests, and most other rooms are Western-style. Many new construction Japanese apartments have no washitsu at all, instead using linoleum or hardwood floors.

The size of a washitsu is measured by the number of tatami mats, using the counter word jō (畳), which, depending on the area, are between 1.5 and 1.8 m^{2} (16 and 19 sq ft). (See tatami.) Typical room sizes are six or eight tatami mats in a private home. There are also half-sized mats, as in a 4.5-tatami room.

People sit directly on the tatami, on zabuton (a kind of cushion), or on special low chairs set on the tatami (zaisu). For sleeping, a futon is laid out in the evening and folded away in the morning. Other furniture in a washitsu may include a low table at which a family may eat dinner or entertain guests, and a kotatsu, a particular type of low table that contains a heating element used in the wintertime, may also be provided. The kotatsu may be particularly important in winter as most Japanese homes do not have central heating.

The antonym is yōshitsu (洋室), meaning "Western-style room(s)". Another term for washitsu is nihonma (日本間) or zashiki (座敷), and the corresponding term for yōshitsu is yōma (洋間).

== See also ==
- Higashiyama Bunka in Muromachi period
