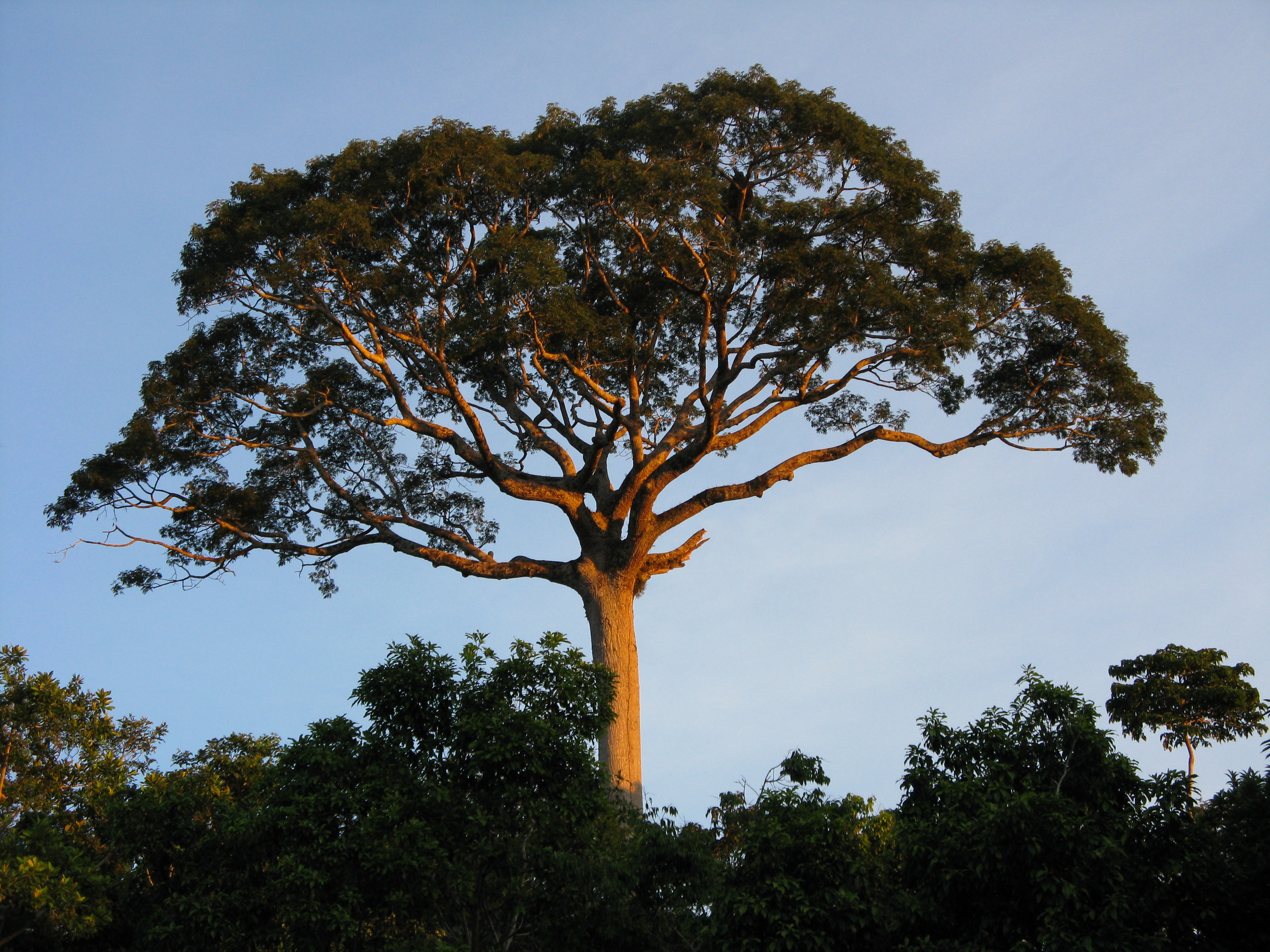
- In eastern Peru

Conservation status
- Least Concern (IUCN 3.1)

Scientific classification
- Kingdom: Plantae
- Clade: Tracheophytes
- Clade: Angiosperms
- Clade: Eudicots
- Clade: Rosids
- Order: Malvales
- Family: Malvaceae
- Genus: Ceiba
- Species: C. pentandra

Binomial name
- Ceiba pentandra (L.) Gaertn.

Synonyms
- Bombax cumanense Kunth; Bombax mompoxense Kunth; Bombax orientale Spreng.; Bombax pentandrum L.; Ceiba caribaea (DC.) A.Chev.; Ceiba guineensis (Schumach.) A.Chev.; Ceiba occidentalis (Spreng.) Burkill; Ceiba thonningii A.Chev.; Eriodendron caribaeum (DC.) G.Don; Eriodendron occidentale (Spreng.) G.Don; Eriodendron orientale Kostel.; Eriodendron pentandrum (L.) Kurz; Gossampinus alba Buch.-Ham.; Gossampinus rumphii Schott & Endl.; Xylon pentandrum (L.) Kuntze

= Ceiba pentandra =

Kapok tree cultivated for seed fibre

Ceiba pentandra is a tropical tree of the order Malvales and the family Malvaceae (previously placed in the family Bombacaceae), native to Mexico, Central America, the Caribbean, and the northern half of South America; some authors also consider it native in western and central Africa. It is widely introduced in other tropical regions including South and Southeast Asia, where it is cultivated.

The tree and the cotton-like fluff obtained from its seed pods are commonly known in English as kapok, a Malay-derived name which originally applied to the related species Bombax ceiba, a native of tropical Asia. In Spanish-speaking countries the tree is commonly known as "ceiba" and in French-speaking countries as fromager. The tree is cultivated for its cottonlike seed fibre, particularly in south-east Asia, and is also known as the Java cotton, Java kapok, silk-cotton or samauma.

== Description ==
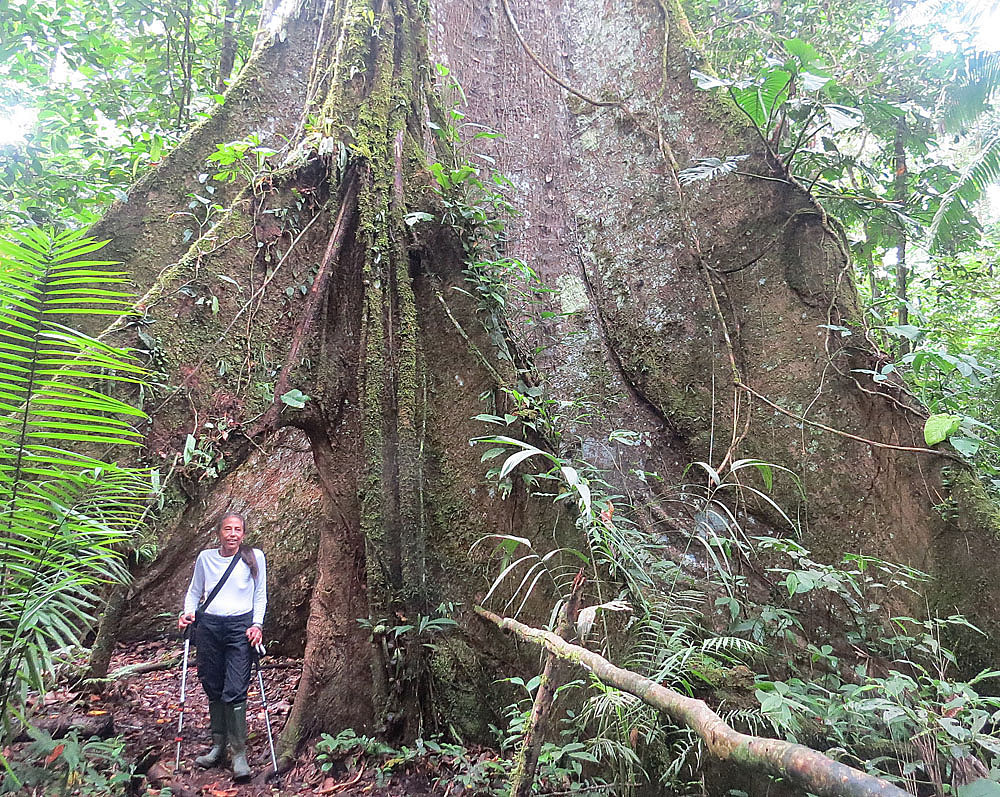
Base of giant specimen in eastern Ecuador

=== Vegetative characteristics ===
Ceiba pentandra is an up to 60 m tall tree with large plank buttresses. The buttress roots extend 12 to 15 m (40 to 50 ft) up the trunk, and extend up to 20 m (65 ft) outwards from the trunk and then continue below ground to a total length of 50 m (165 ft). The trunk and many of the larger branches are often crowded with large simple spines. These major branches, usually 4 to 6 in number, can be up to 1.8 m (6 ft) thick and form a crown of foliage as much as 60 m (200 ft) in width. The palmately divided leaves are composed of 5–9 (–15) leaflets, the leaflets 5–21 cm (2–8 in) long and 2–6.5 cm (1–3 in) broad.

=== Generative characteristics ===
The tree is briefly deciduous, and it is during this leafless period that it flowers. The globose, fasciculate inflorescence bears white, chiropterophilous, nocturnal, nectariferous, inclined or pendant flowers. The flowers have five petals. The five stamens with cream white staminal filaments have gold-yellow anthers. The pistil is creamy white. The pendant, elliptic, brown, 5-valved capsule fruit bears 66–250 ovoid, 4–6 mm wide, 45–65 mg heavy seeds, which are embedded in pale yellow silk cotton, which develops from the endocarp.

== Taxonomy ==
It was described by Bombax pentandrum L. by L. in 1753. It was moved to the genus Ceiba Mill. as Ceiba pentandra (L.) Gaertn. by Gaertn. in 1791. It is the type species of its genus.

== Distribution and habitat ==
Ceiba pentandra originated in the American tropics. Although it is generally thought to have been introduced to Africa by humans, there is no historical evidence of this, and there is strong ecological, botanical and cytological evidence that the tree is native to western and central Africa. The dispersal mechanism by which the tree may have crossed the Atlantic Ocean is uncertain, but the fruits float, and could have been transported by ocean currents. Domesticated in West Africa, Ceiba pentandra is possibly native from Cape Verde eastwards to Chad and southwards to Angola. It has been introduced from there to East Africa and Asia.

== Ecology ==
In west Africa, south-east Asia, and the Pacific Islands, the flowers are pollinated by pteropodid bats. The seeds are dispersed by wind or by water.

== Uses ==
=== Kapok fibre ===
The fibre is light, very buoyant, resilient, resistant to water, but very flammable. The process of harvesting and separating the fibre is labour-intensive and menial. It is difficult to spin, but is used as an alternative to down as filling in mattresses, pillows, upholstery, zafus, and stuffed toys such as teddy bears, and for insulation. It was previously popularly used in life jackets and similar devices, until synthetic materials largely replaced the fibre.

=== Traditional medicine ===
The bark has been used in folk medicine as decoctions and infusions of the flowers. The tree is regarded as a "teacher plant" in Ayahuasca shamanism by the Ese Ejja people of Peru, and the Shipibo-Conibo people believe a tree spirit causes visions.

=== Seed oil ===
A vegetable oil can be pressed from the seeds. The oil has a yellow colour and a pleasant, mild odour and taste, resembling cottonseed oil. It becomes rancid quickly when exposed to air. Kapok oil is produced in India, Indonesia and Malaysia. It has an iodine value of 85–100; this makes it a nondrying oil, which means that it does not dry out significantly when exposed to air.

== Religion and folklore ==
The tree is a sacred symbol in Maya mythology.

The Ceiba is an important tree in Cuban culture. It is a sacred tree in Palo, Arará and Santería. Following from its religious connection to the Orishas of Santería, many rituals and customs surround the tree: offerings are placed or buried near the trunks, the trees are circumambulated, and the trees are generally not tampered with out of respect.

According to the folklore of Trinidad and Tobago, the Castle of the Devil is a huge C. pentandra growing deep in the forest in which Bazil, the demon of death, was imprisoned by a carpenter. The carpenter tricked the devil into entering the tree in which he carved seven rooms, one above the other, into the trunk. Folklore claims that Bazil still resides in that tree.

Most masks from Burkina Faso, especially those of Bobo and Mossi people, are carved from C. pentandra timber.

C. pentandra is known as the Kankantrie/Kankantri among the Afro-Surinamese community, particularly those that subscribe to the Winti religion. The important role of the Kankantrie among the Afro-Surinamese as a holy residence for spirits has been documented for centuries. Despite the efforts of the Dutch to convert African slaves in Suriname to Christianity, many black Surinamese people continue to hold the tree in high regard. Cutting the tree is avoided even in modern-day Suriname, and often paired with a ritual in cases where cutting the tree is unavoidable.

== Symbolism ==
Ceiba pentandra is the national emblem of Guatemala, Puerto Rico, and Equatorial Guinea. It appears on the coat of arms and flag of Equatorial Guinea.

The Cotton Tree was a landmark in downtown Freetown, Sierra Leone, and is considered a symbol of freedom for the former slaves that immigrated there. The roughly 40-metre tall tree snapped near the base, and fell in a storm on 24 May 2023.

== Gallery ==
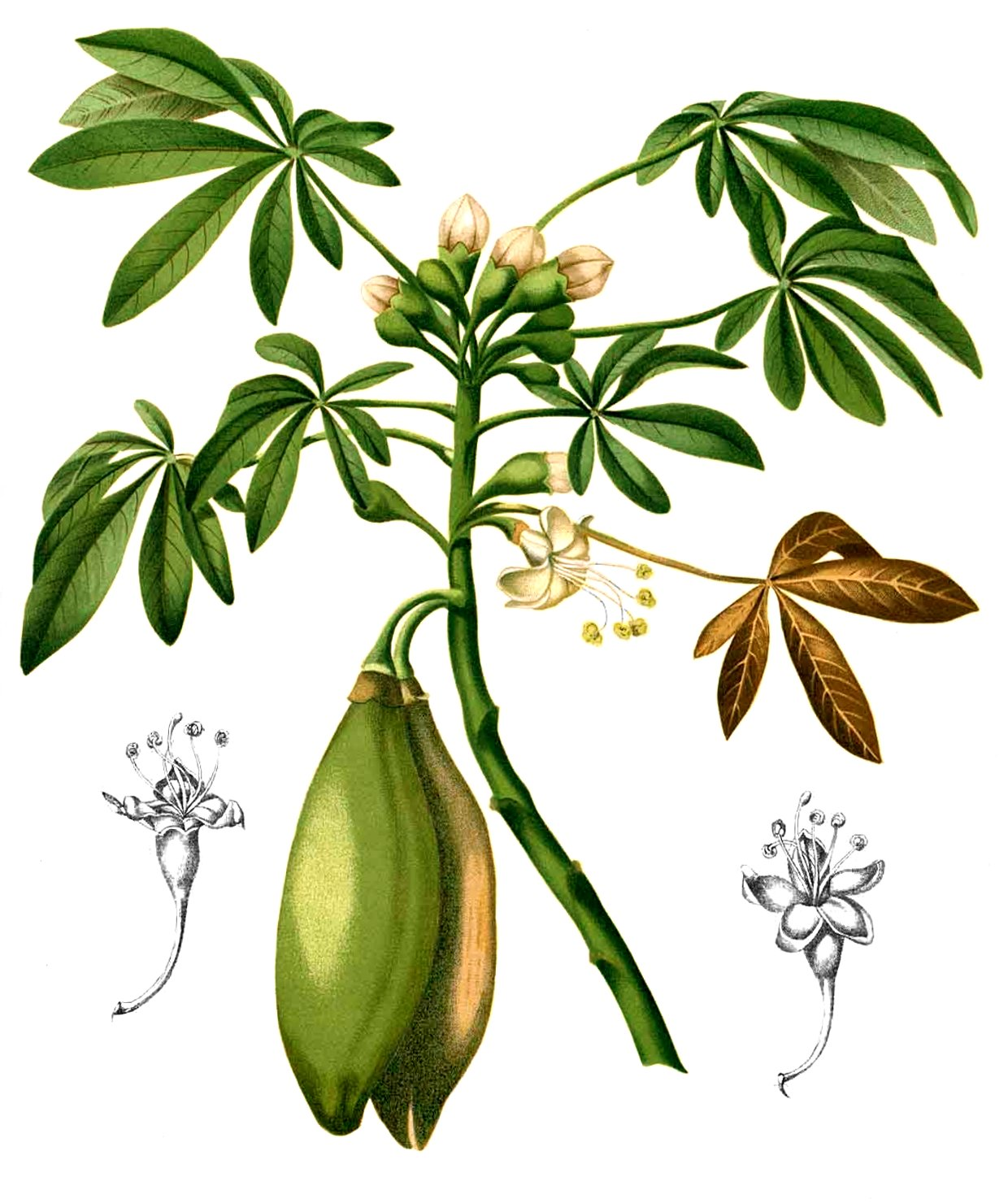
Ceiba pentranda

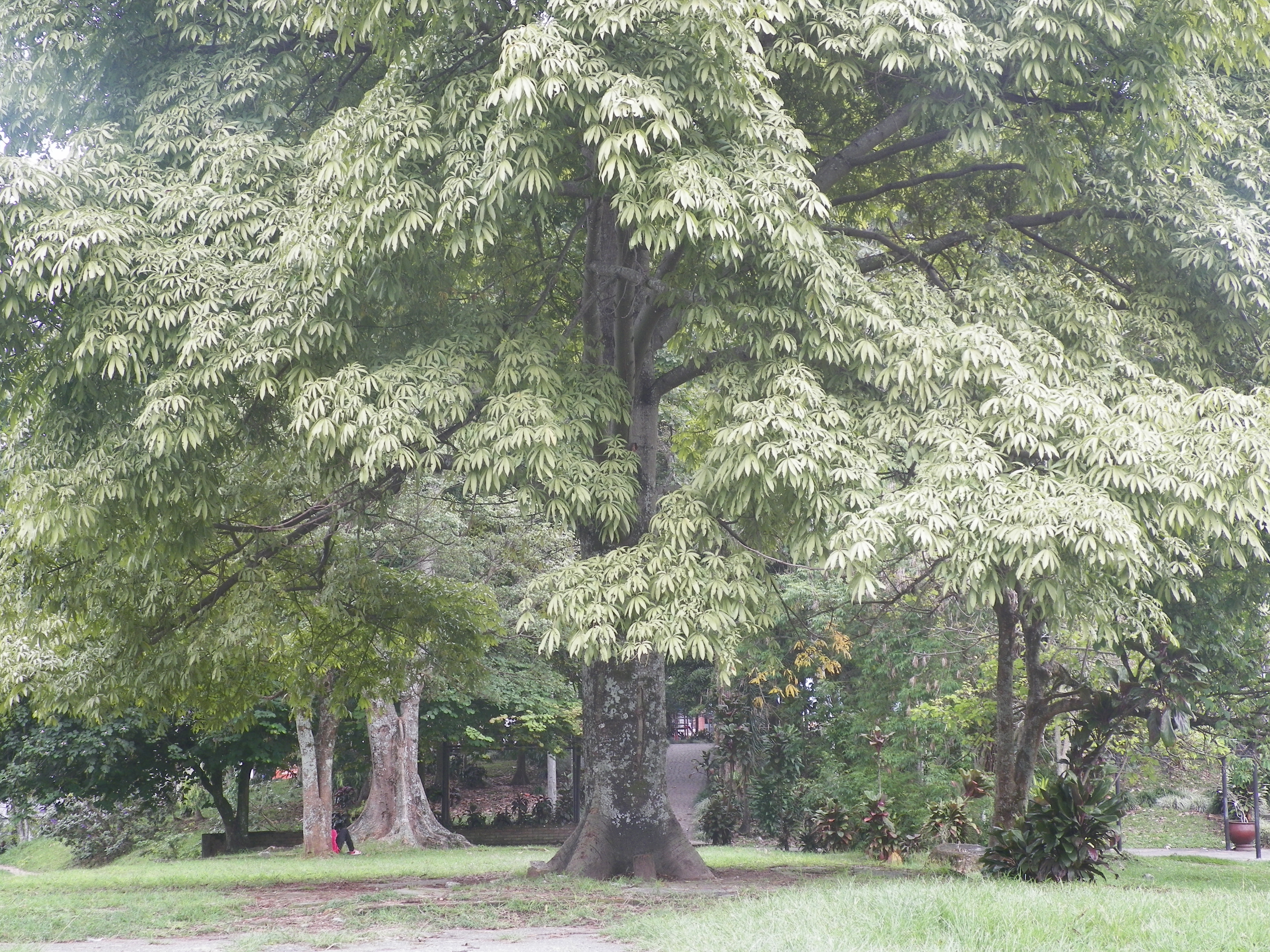
Canopy

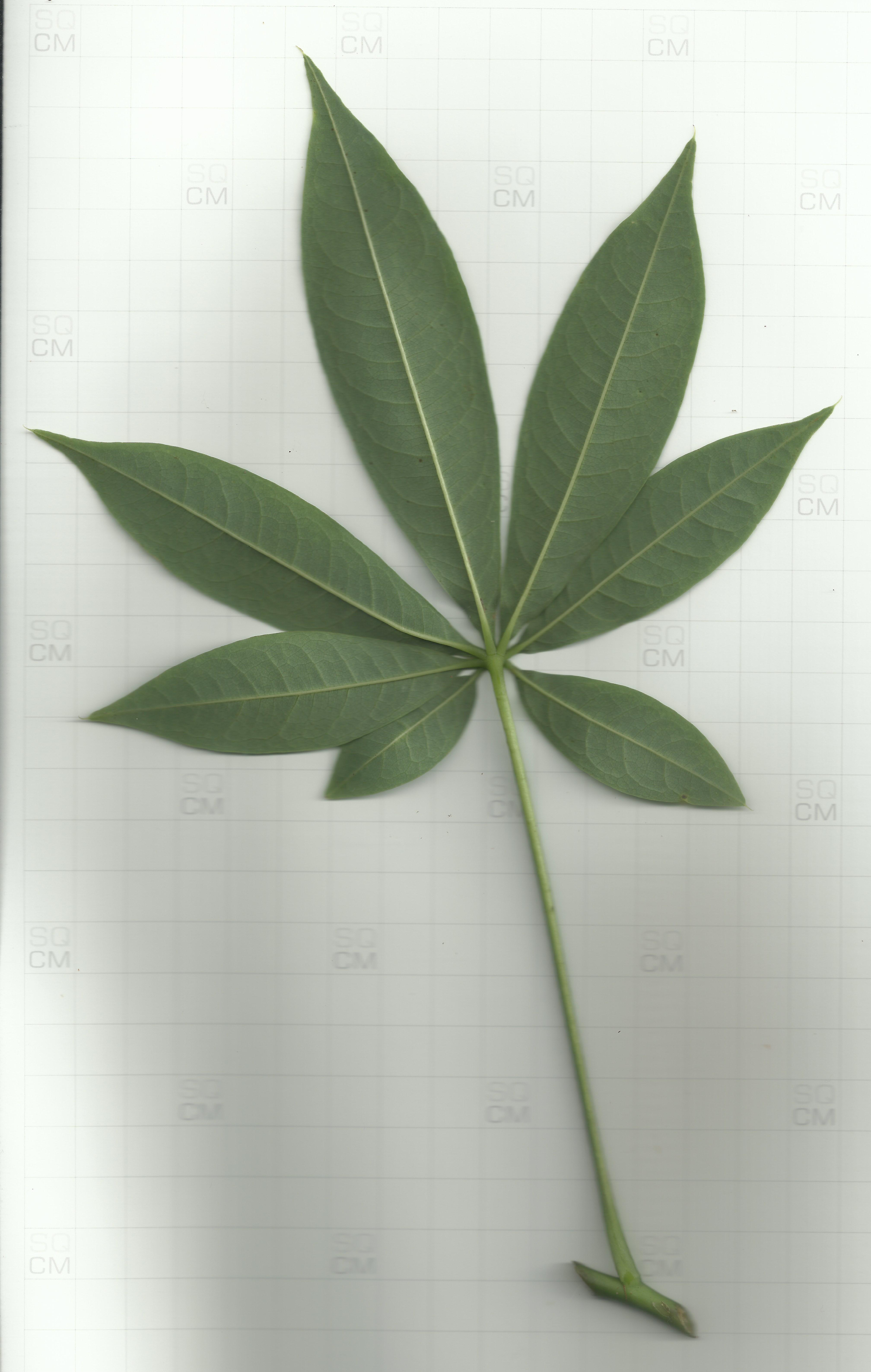
Underside of single leaf

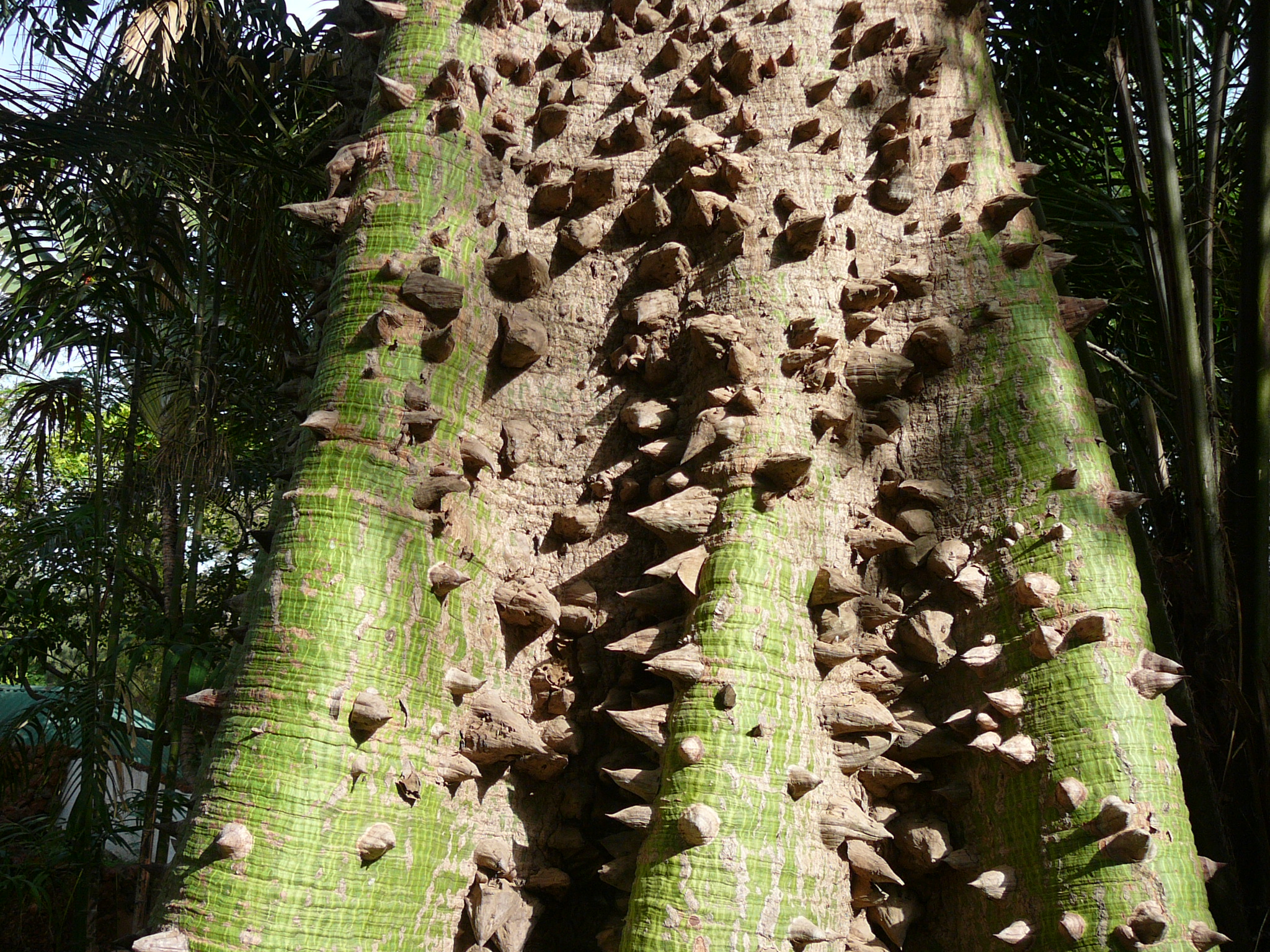
Thorny buttress roots and trunk base

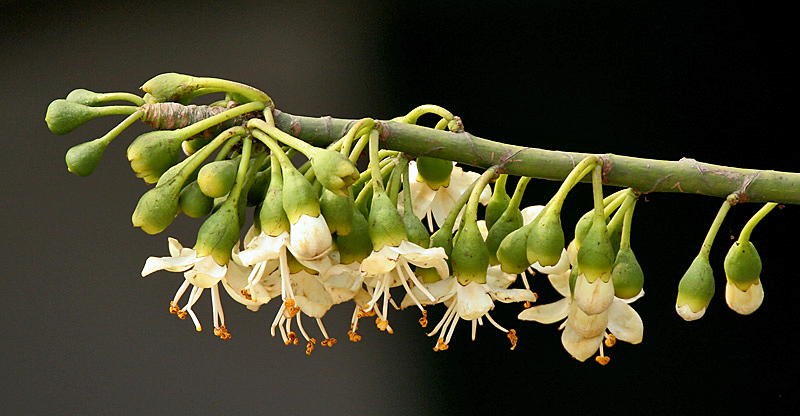
Flowers in profile

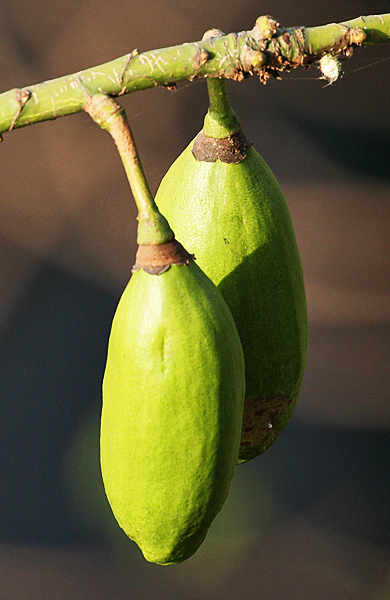
Fruit close-up

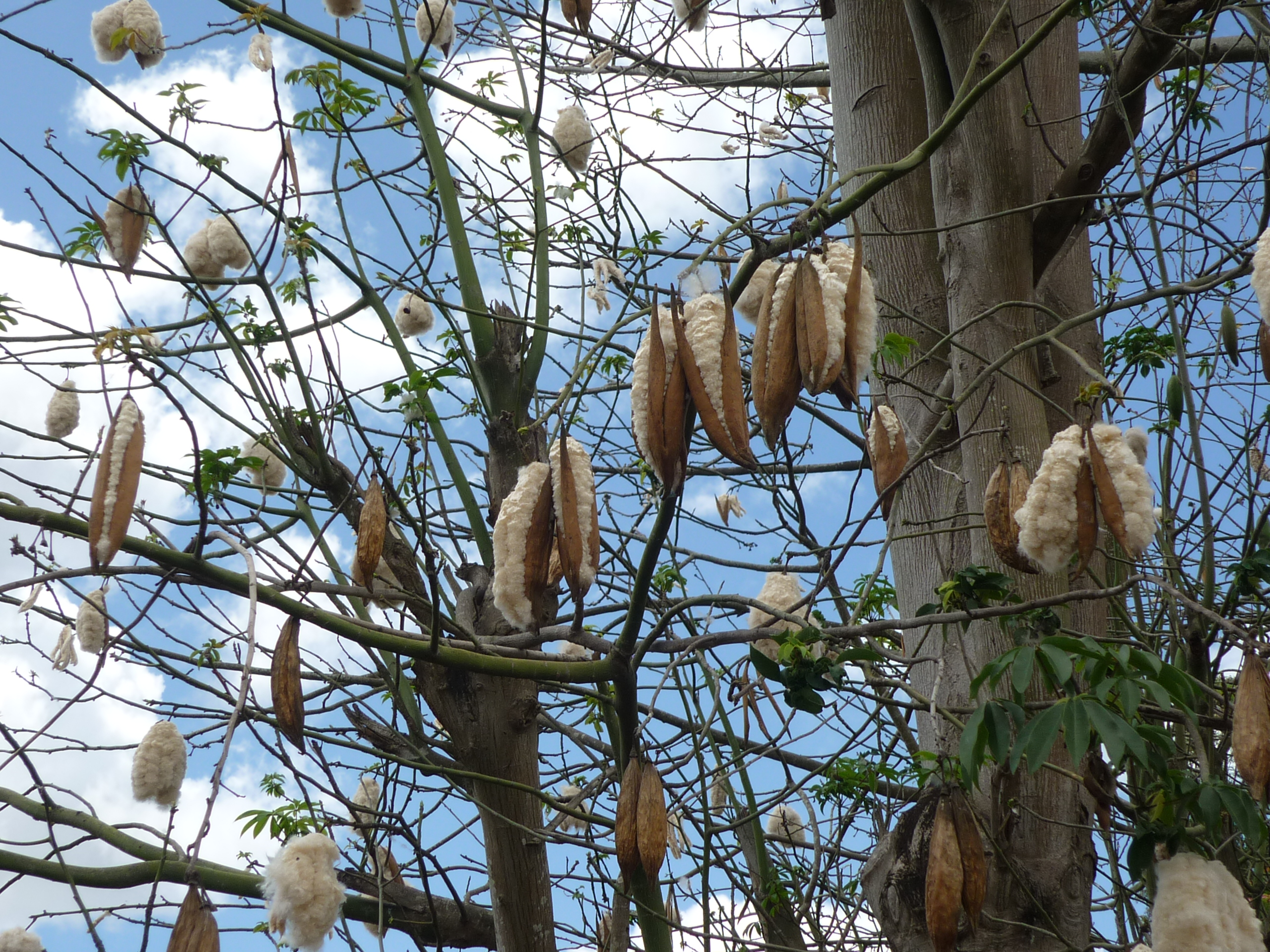
Twigs laden with dehiscent fruit showing kapok

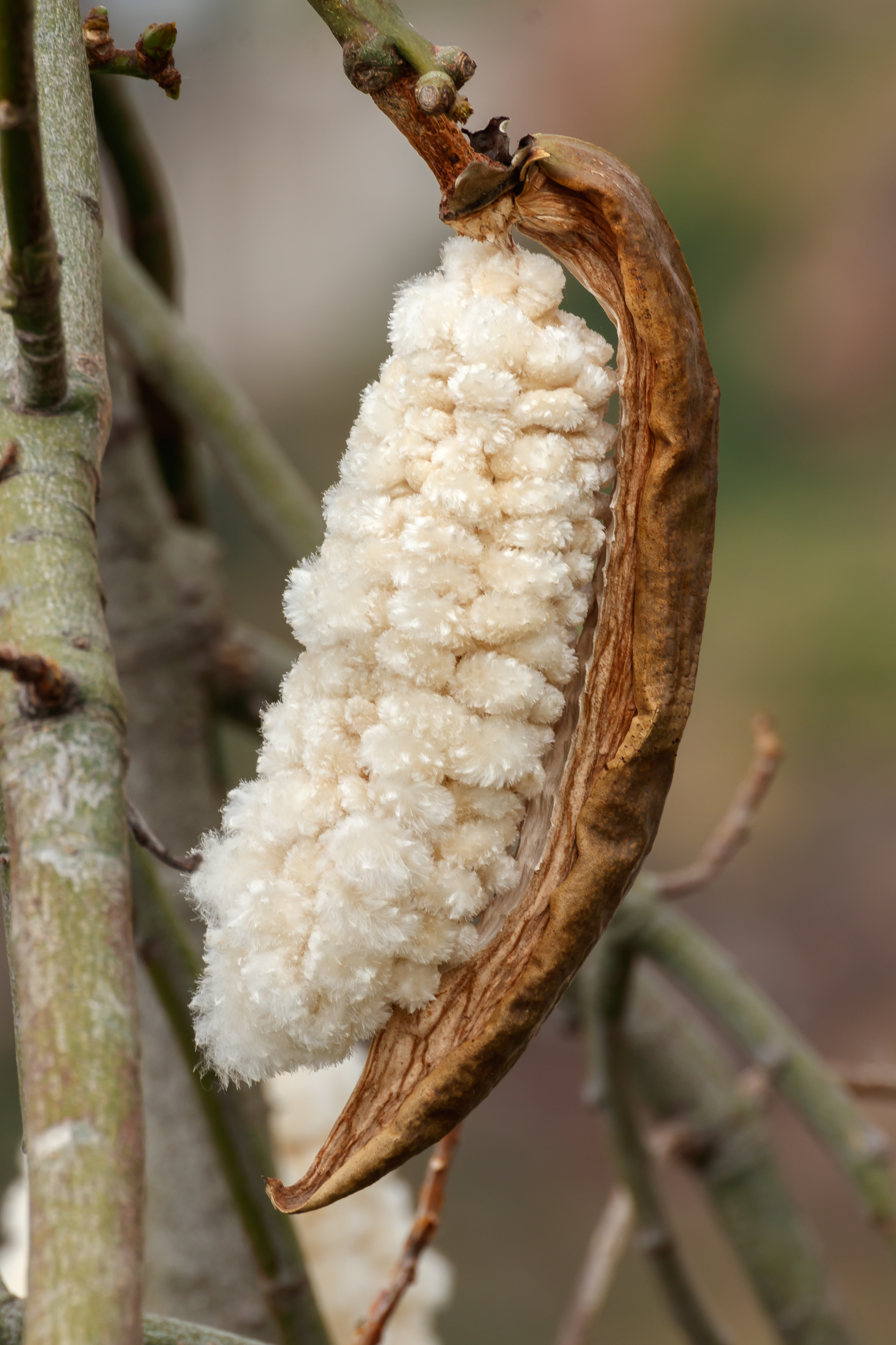
Single dehiscent fruit revealing kapok-surrounded seeds

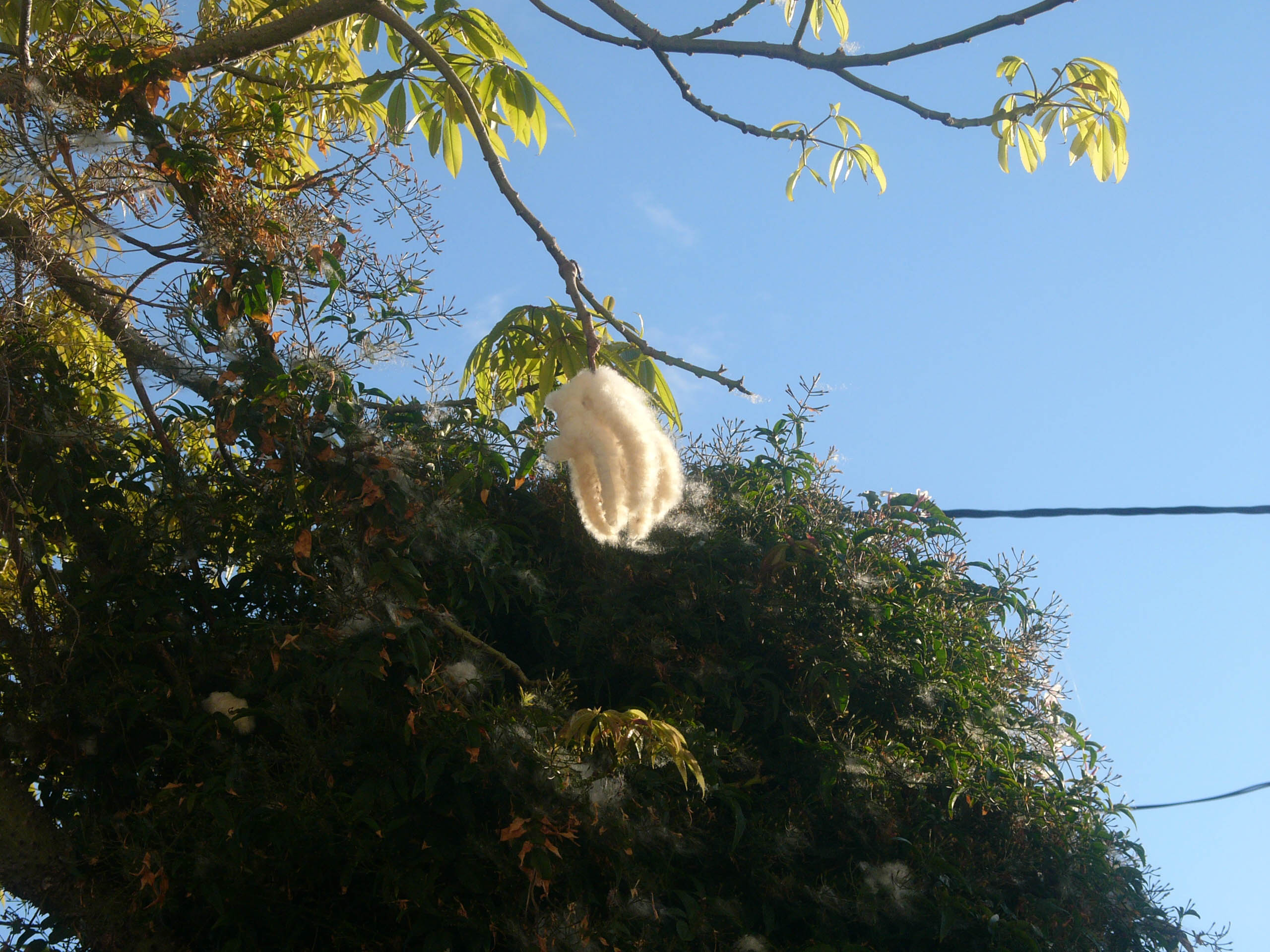
Dehisced fruit having shed shrivelled valves

== See also ==
- The Great Kapok Tree
- Xtabay
- Parque de la Ceiba
- Fiber crop
