= Cushion =

Soft bag of ornamental material filled with soft material

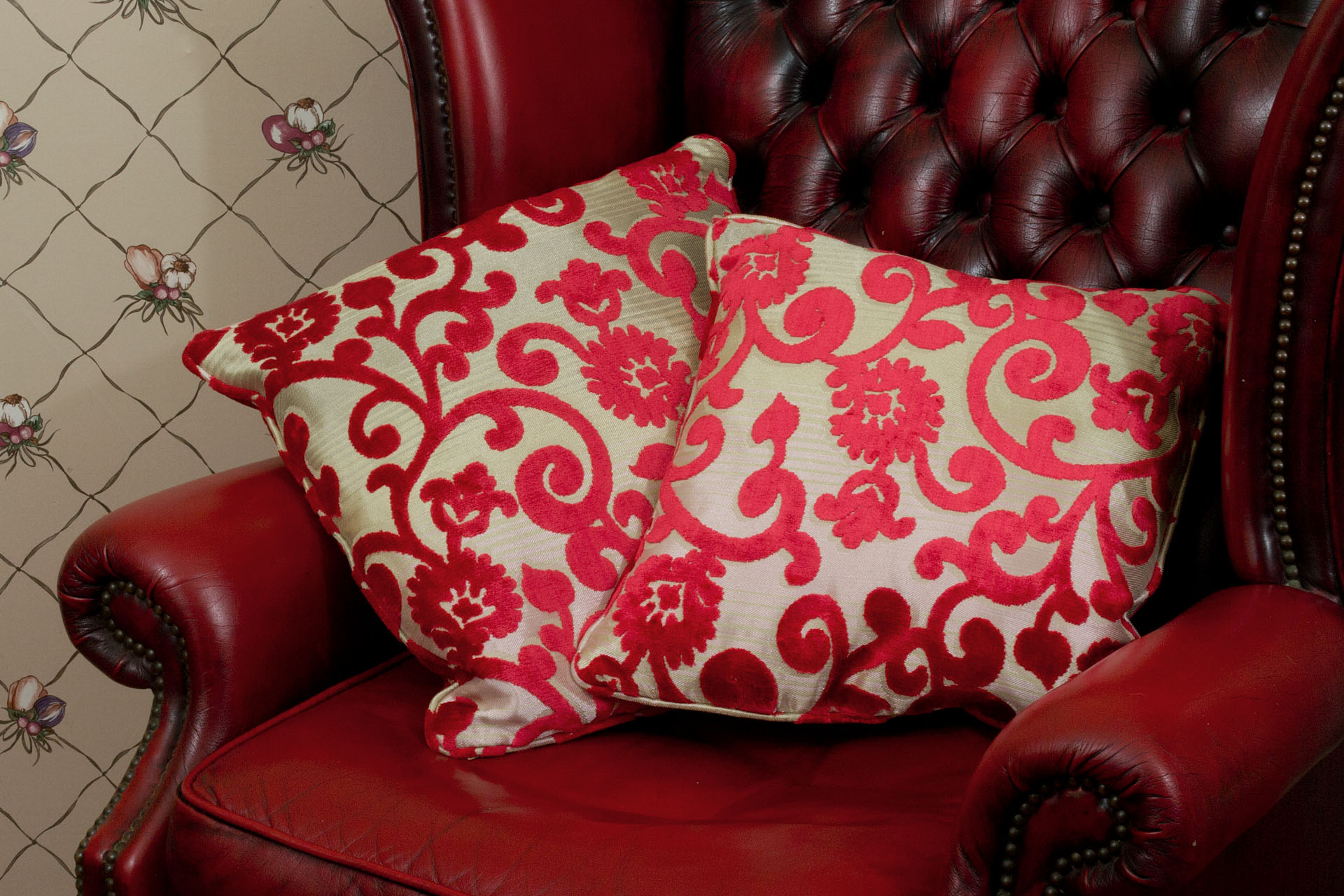
Scatter cushions in an armchair

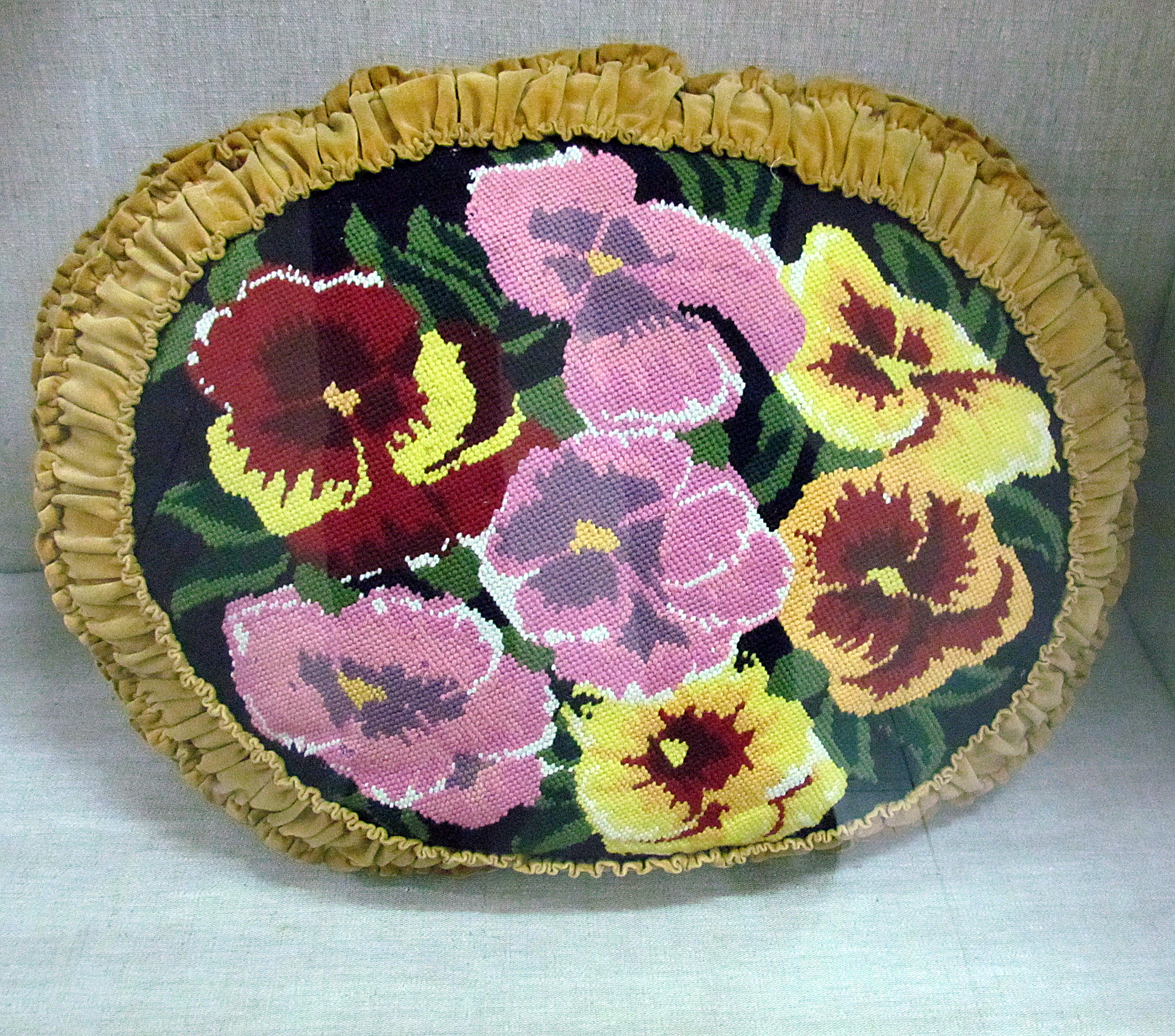
Cushion from Museum of Yugoslavia

A cushion is a soft bag of some ornamental material, usually stuffed with wool, hair, feathers, polyester staple fiber, non-woven material, cotton, or even paper torn into fragments. It may be used for sitting or kneeling upon, or to soften the hardness or angularity of a chair or couch. Decorative cushions often have a patterned cover material, and are used as decoration for furniture.

A cushion is also referred to as a bolster, hassock, headrest, a tush, and a sham.

Cushions and rugs can be used temporarily outside to soften a hard ground. They can be placed on sunloungers and used to prevent annoyances from moist grass and biting insects. Some dialects of English use this word to refer to throw pillows as well.

The cushion is a very ancient article of furniture; the inventories of the contents of palaces and great houses in the early Middle Ages constantly made mention of them. Cushions were then often of great size, covered with leather, and firm enough to serve as a seat, but the steady tendency of all furniture has been to grow smaller with time. Today, the cushion is considered an upholstery item.

== Etymology ==
The word cushion comes from Middle English cushin, from Anglo-French cussin, quissin, from Vulgar Latin *coxinus, and from Latin coxa, hip. The first known use of the word cushion was in the 14th century. Cushions are known for being comfortable and soft.

== History ==
The first pillow in history was used by Gautama Buddha 2,500 years ago. Such pillows are called zafu (“za” means seat, and “fu” means reed pillow). These are pillows stuffed with this aquatic plant. Zabuton is a sitting pillow that is usually used in a traditional Japanese setting. Zabuton is a borrowed word from Japanese, which is also sometimes used in Western culture to describe a zanik, a flat mat onto which a zafu is placed. Zabuton is usually used when sitting in the seiza or agura pose, and it can also be used when sitting on a chair. Zabuton is used during meditation, such as zazen.

Depending on the type of use, there were floor pillows, pillows for chairs, and for sofas. Pillows were used as seats in France and Spain, and during the time of Saint-Simon, we see that at the Spanish court they were still considered a highly honorable substitute for a chair. In France, the right to kneel on a pillow in church behind the king was zealously guarded and strictly regulated, as we learn again from the works of Saint-Simon. Such pillows were called “carro” or “square.” When seats were rough and hard, pillows were perhaps a necessity. The tradition of using pillows as the sole seating place is still encountered in the Maghreb countries and in the traditional Middle East.

In the 1960s, poufy pillows filled with polystyrene beads appeared, which became a symbol of the hippie era. In the early 1980s, nursing or maternity pillows appeared as large U-shaped or boomerang-shaped cushions designed to support the back or belly of a pregnant woman. Later, it is used to rock the baby into a comfortable position for breastfeeding. Today a pillow can be a luxurious cushion, for example, at a wedding the maid of honor hands over the wedding rings on a small embroidered silk pillow; at an inauguration, a child hands scissors on a pillow to officials who will cut the ribbon.

== See also ==
- Bean bag chair
- Buffer
- Cushioning
- Pillow
- Sachet
- Sofa
- Zabuton
- Zafu
