= Zaisu =

Japanese chair which has no legs

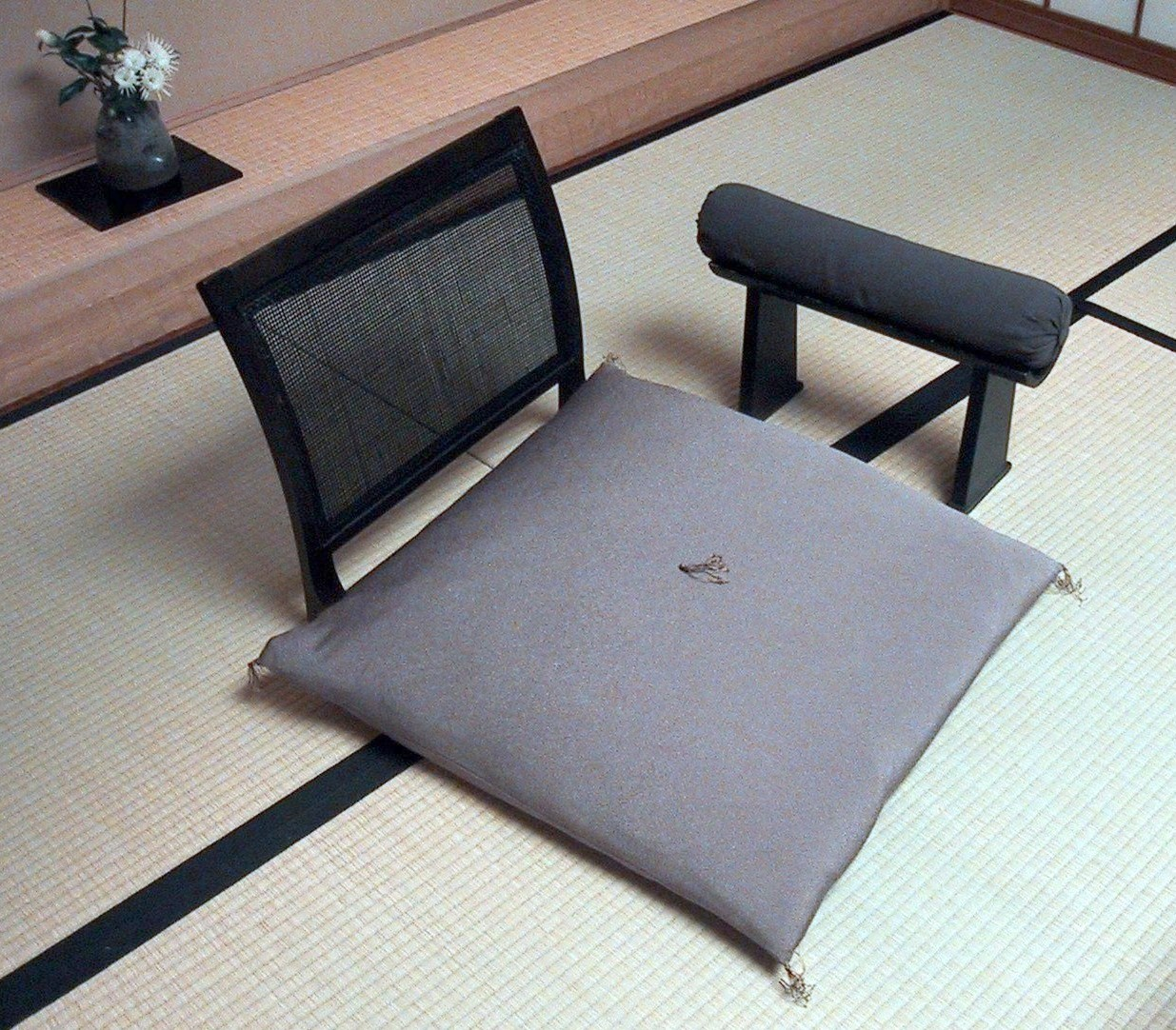
A zaisu, pictured here with zabuton and kyōsoku

A zaisu (Japanese: 座椅子) is a Japanese chair with a back and no legs. They are often found in traditional rooms with tatami mats, and are often used for relaxing under heated kotatsu tables. Zaisu come in many styles, and can either have a cushion built in or be used with a zabuton. For an even more relaxed seating arrangement, one may also use a Japanese style armrest called a kyōsoku (脇息).

== Use ==
Traditionally, the correct sitting style in Japan is seiza, kneeling with the weight on top of the lower legs, which are folded underneath the body. However this can become painful after long periods of time or for people who are not used to it, so many prefer the zaisu, where the back is supported and legs can be positioned more comfortably.

Zaisu are very common in Japan, particularly in houses with traditional Japanese-style rooms (washitsu) where low tables and sitting on a floor of tatami mats are commonplace. They are used for relaxing on a cold night under a heated kotatsu table.
