= Zafu =

Cushion for sitting often associated with meditation

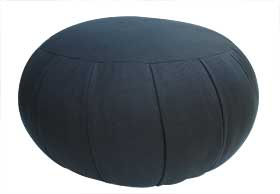
A typical kapok-filled zafu

A zafu (Japanese: 座蒲, pronounced [d͡zaɸɯ]) or putuan (Chinese: 蒲團, pronounced [pʰǔ.tʰwǎn]) is a round cushion. Although also a utilitarian accessory, it is best known for its use in zazen Zen meditation.

== Name ==
Although zafu is often translated as "sewn seat" in American English, the meaning of the Japanese kanji, 座蒲, is different. Za (座) means "seat", and fu (蒲) means reedmace (cattail, Typha spp.). A zafu is a seat stuffed with the fluffy, soft, downy fibres of the disintegrating reedmace seed heads. The Japanese zafu originates in China, where these meditation seats were originally filled with reedmace down.

The words zabuton, zafuton and futon are closely linked. The word zazen meaning "seated meditation" or "sitting meditation" is also closely linked. In western usage, zafu refers to a meditation cushion, and zabuton refers to the cushioned mat upon which a zafu is placed.

== Construction ==
Typical zafus are about 35 centimetres (14 in) in diameter, and often about 20 centimetres (8 in) high when fluffed. Contemporary zafus are sewn from three pieces of heavy cloth, usually colored black: two round swatches of equal size for the top and the bottom of the cushion, and a long rectangle that is sewn into gathers in between. They are typically filled with either kapok (a fluffy plant fibre, similar to Typha) or buckwheat hulls. Zen Buddhist practitioners traditionally sit on a zafu when engaged in sitting meditation. The cushion raises the hips, making the entire range of cross-legged sitting positions more stable for the meditator.

== Use in zazen ==
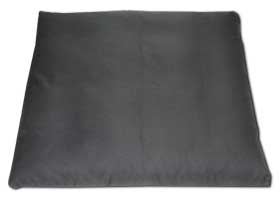
A typical kapok-filled zabuton

Before and after practicing zazen, Zen practitioners perform a gassho bow to the zafu, to fellow practitioners, and to the teacher. In many practice places, there is a prescribed form for respectfully handling zafu while walking in the meditation hall, or zendo.

A zabuton (Japanese: 座布団, [d͡zabɯtoɴ]) is a rectangular cushion, about 76 centimetres (30 in) by 71 centimetres (28 in), that is often used under a zafu cushion to provide comfort and support when engaged in zazen. The outer cover is typically made of a heavy duty fabric and has a zipper along one side so that it can be easily removed and washed. Inside the cover, the batting is enclosed in a natural cotton casing.

== See also ==
- Meditative postures
