= Meditative postures =

Body positions used in meditation

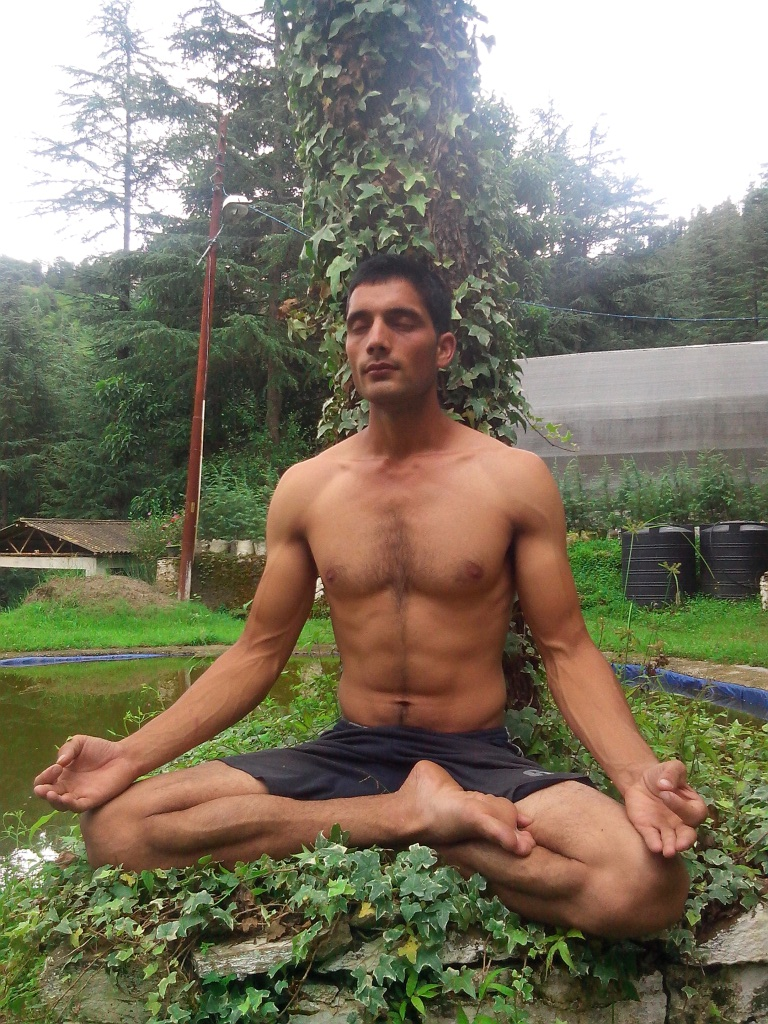
Siddhasana is an ancient meditation seat.

Meditative postures or meditation seats are the body positions or asanas, usually sitting but also sometimes standing or reclining, used to facilitate meditation. Best known in the Buddhist and Hindu traditions are the lotus and kneeling positions; other options include sitting on a chair, with the spine upright.

Meditation is sometimes practiced while walking, such as kinhin, doing simple repetitive tasks, as in Zen samu, or work which encourages mindfulness.

== Postures in the Yoga Sutras ==
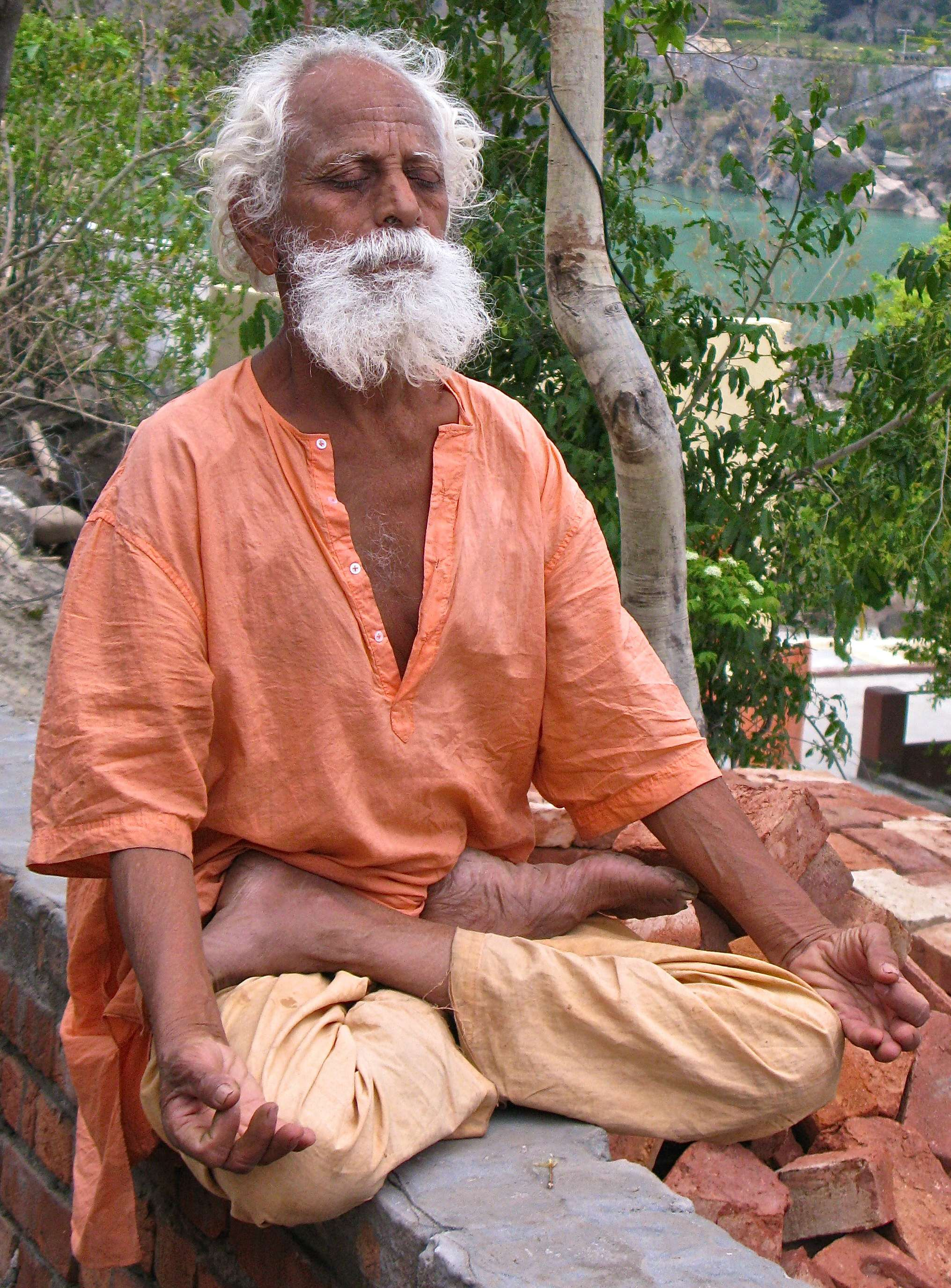
Padmasana or Lotus pose is among the twelve meditation asanas named in the Bhasya commentary accompanying the Yoga Sutras of Patanjali.

The Yoga Sutras of Patanjali describe yoga as having eight limbs, one being asana, the meditation seat. The sutras do not name any asanas, merely specifying the characteristics of a good asana, stating:

स्थिरसुखमासनम् ॥४६॥
sthira sukham āsanam
Your [meditation] seat should be steady and comfortable. Yoga Sutras 2:46

The Sutras are embedded in the Bhasya commentary, which scholars including Philipp Maas now believe are by the same author; it names 12 seated meditation asanas, possibly all cross-legged, including Padmasana, Virasana, Bhadrasana (now called Baddha Konasana), and Svastikasana.

== Sitting on the ground ==
Sitting positions, often cross-legged, provide a stable base for meditation, and have been used for the purpose in Buddhism and Hinduism for many centuries. These include Padmasana (full lotus), Ardha Padmasana (half lotus), Siddhasana or Muktasana (also called Burmese posture, sitting with the knees on the ground and the feet tucked in close to the body), and Sukhasana (any easy cross-legged position). Other possibilities are the kneeling postures Virasana (sitting between the heels) and Vajrasana or Seiza (sitting on the heels). Another sitting posture, Baddha Konasana (Cobbler's Pose), is suitable for people who can sit with the feet together and both knees on the ground; B. K. S. Iyengar states that to meditate in this position, the palms should be held in prayer position over the chest, which demands some practice for balance. Seymour Ginsburg, describing Gurdjieff meditation, suggests that such compact positions help the meditator to "include the entire experience of ourself in our attention."

The lotus position in particular can be extremely uncomfortable for Westerners who have not practised sitting cross-legged since early childhood. They may, in the words of the yoga and meditation teacher Anne Cushman, be practising "self-torture ... apparently believing that bruising your inner thigh with your ankle is crucial to spiritual awakening." The pose can cause beginners knee pain and injury. Baddha Konasana is a safer alternative, provided the knees are not pushed down.

Cushman notes that since meditation is not a posture, no particular posture is required. All the same, she writes, a formal method is helpful, and the asana chosen needs to be stable and comfortable, as the Yoga Sutras state: on the one side, few people would wish to hold strenuous postures like Downward Dog for half an hour or more; on the other side, a restful posture like Savasana (Corpse Pose) might be comfortable but would more likely lead to sleep than meditation. The cross-legged postures are simple and stable, restful for the muscles, but active enough to keep the practitioner awake. The spinal column needs to be erect and in balance; this poise lets the muscles of the back relax, and this in turn allows the attention to be focussed on the breath. These conditions can be met by a variety of postures with or without support, whether a cross-legged posture such as Muktasana, a kneeling posture, or sitting on a chair with the back vertical and the feet on the ground. The traditional support for sitting meditation is a zafu cushion; this elevates the hips above the knees, allowing practitioners with stiff hips to have the spine straight and upright.

Beyond traditional cushions, modern mindfulness practice makes use of other seats like chairs and kneeling meditation benches. A comfortable chair is often recommended for people with back pain or difficulty getting up, while a meditation bench can help beginners optimize spinal alignment. A 2018 pilot study scientifically compared the physical stability offered by a zafu, a chair, and a meditation bench. It found that the only statistically significant difference was in side-to-side sway, where the zafu provided the most stability. For other measures, including front-to-back sway and small, rapid postural tremors, no significant differences were found among the three seats. The researchers noted that the zafu's superior performance in providing stability is "in keeping with the oriental tradition" and consistent with research into Zen sitting postures. The principles of using a zafu to maintain a fixed posture have been applied in other fields, such as in designing chairs for microscopic surgery and for improving children's classroom posture. However, the study also highlighted that practical considerations like comfort are crucial for beginners, noting that some participants reported ankle pain while using the meditation bench, a type of low seat. The study concluded with a general recommendation that "beginners could start practicing meditation in chairs or meditation benches, although a transition to the zafu is recommended for a medium term".

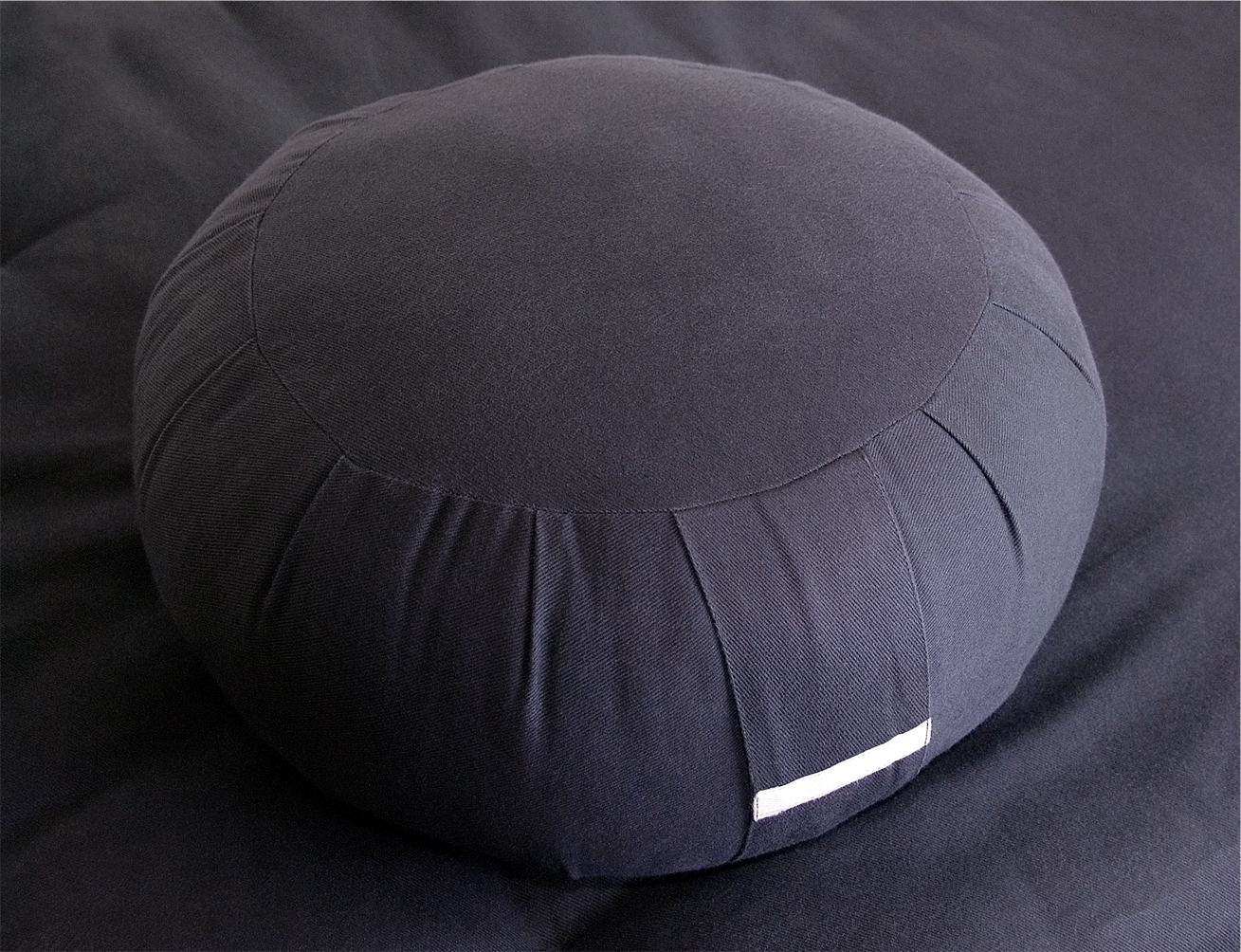
A zafu meditation cushion, often used in Buddhist practice

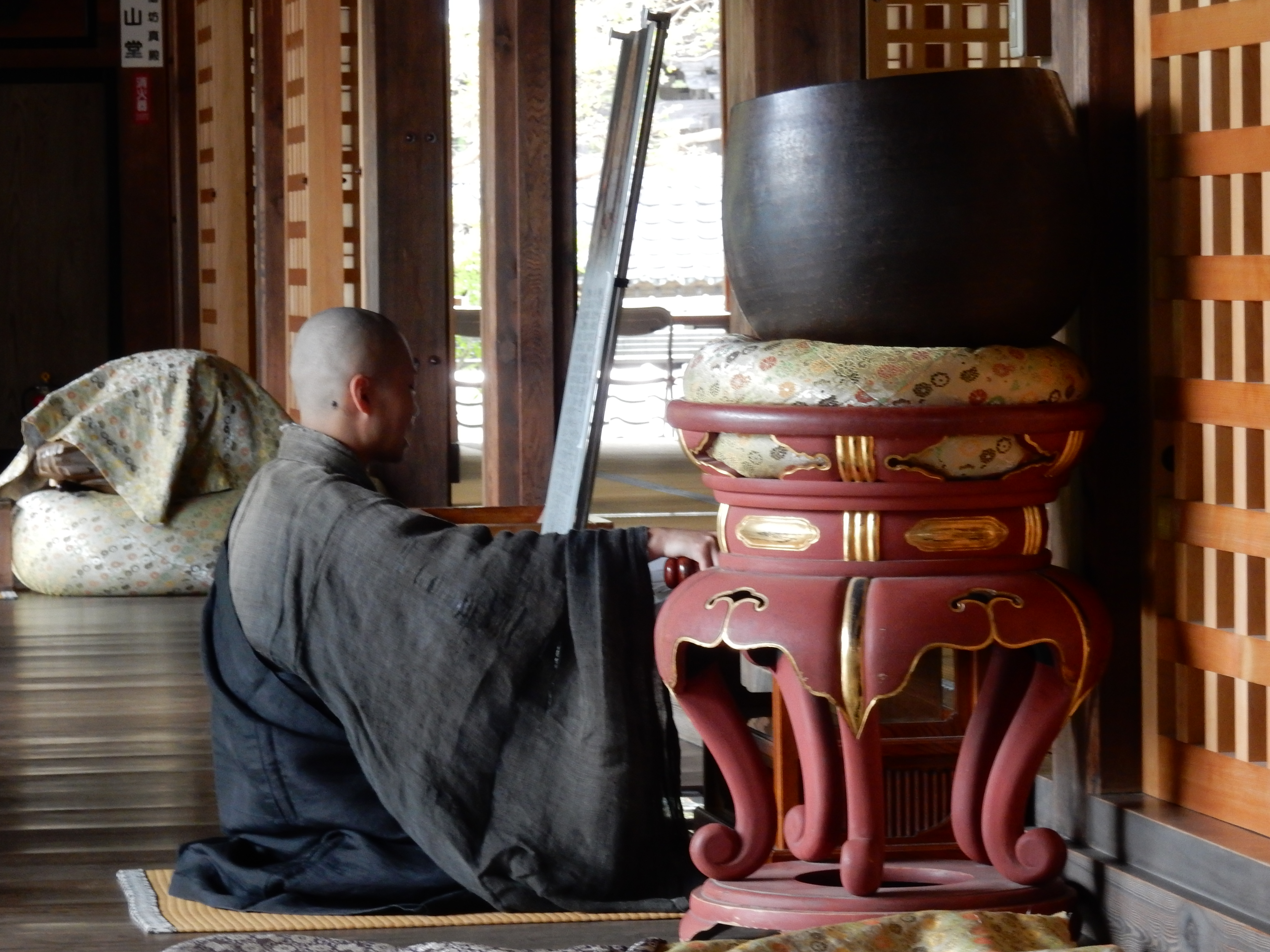
Buddhist monk seated in Seiza. Hōkō-ji temple, Japan

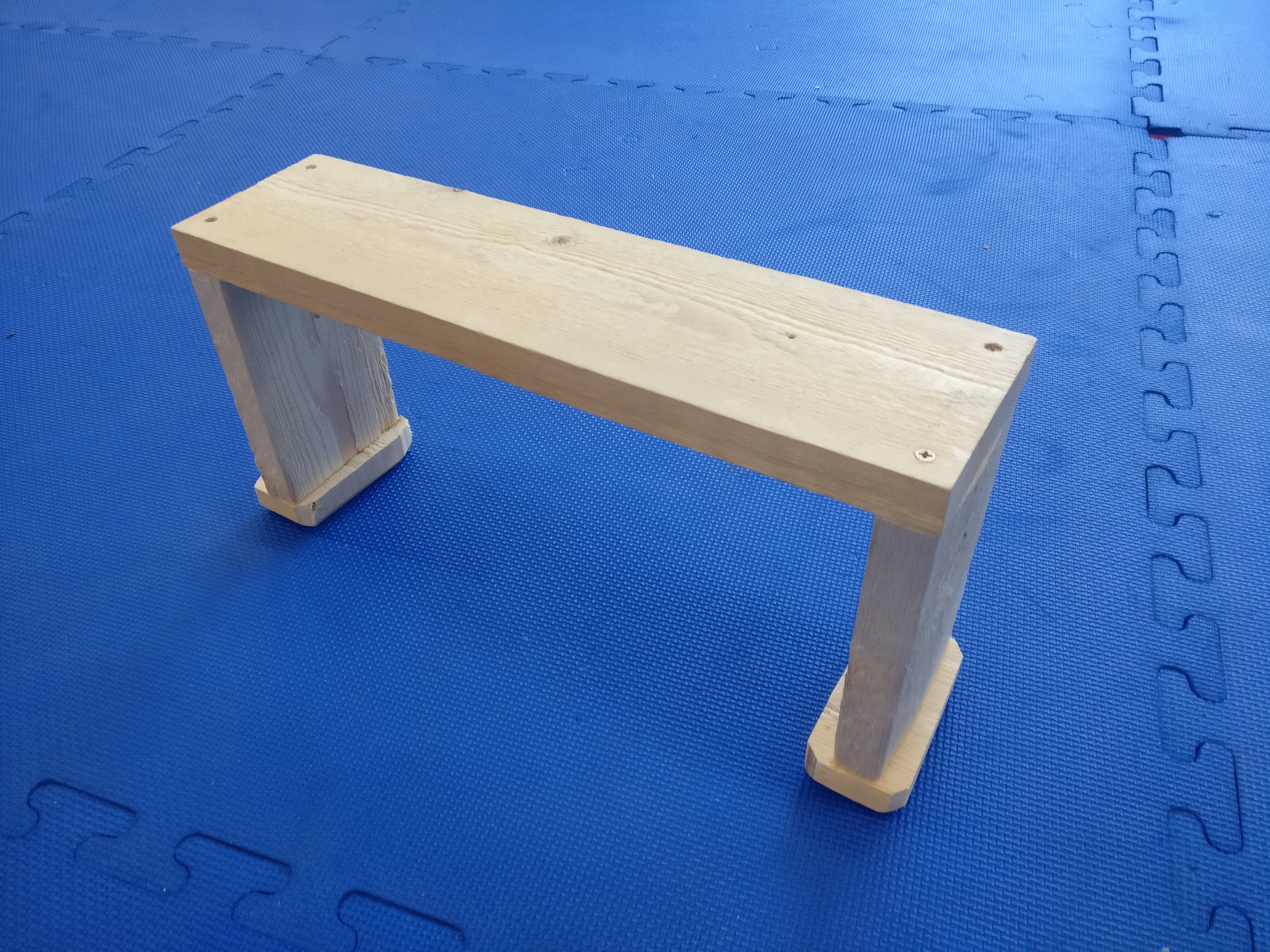
A simple modern meditation stool, used to assist in sitting with the back upright and the legs crossed

== Other postures ==
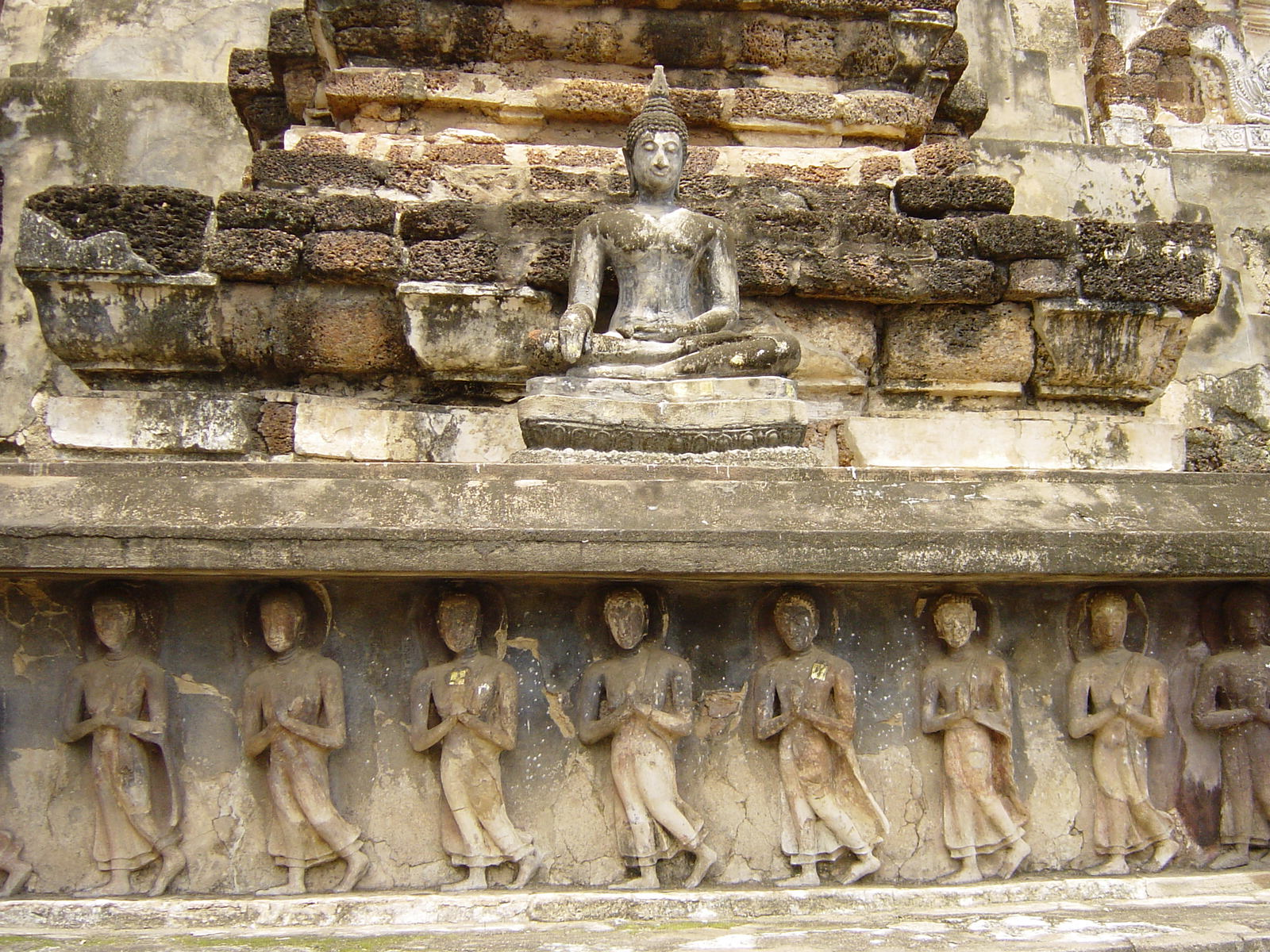
Bas-relief in Sukhothai, Thailand depicting monks during walking meditation.

In various traditions people meditate in other postures. People who find sitting cross-legged uncomfortable can sit upright on a straight-backed chair, flat-footed and without back support, with the hands resting on the thighs, in what is sometimes called the Egyptian position.

Orthodox Christians may practice the meditation of hesychasm sitting on a stool, as was recommended by Saint Gregory of Sinai.

Theravada and Zen Buddhists sometimes vary their sitting meditation by meditating while walking, often very slowly so as to be mindful of each movement.

Standing meditation or zhan zhuang is practised in the Chinese martial art training system Yiquan.

== See also ==
- List of asanas
- Mindful Yoga
- Yogapattasana
