= Zabuton =

Japanese cushion

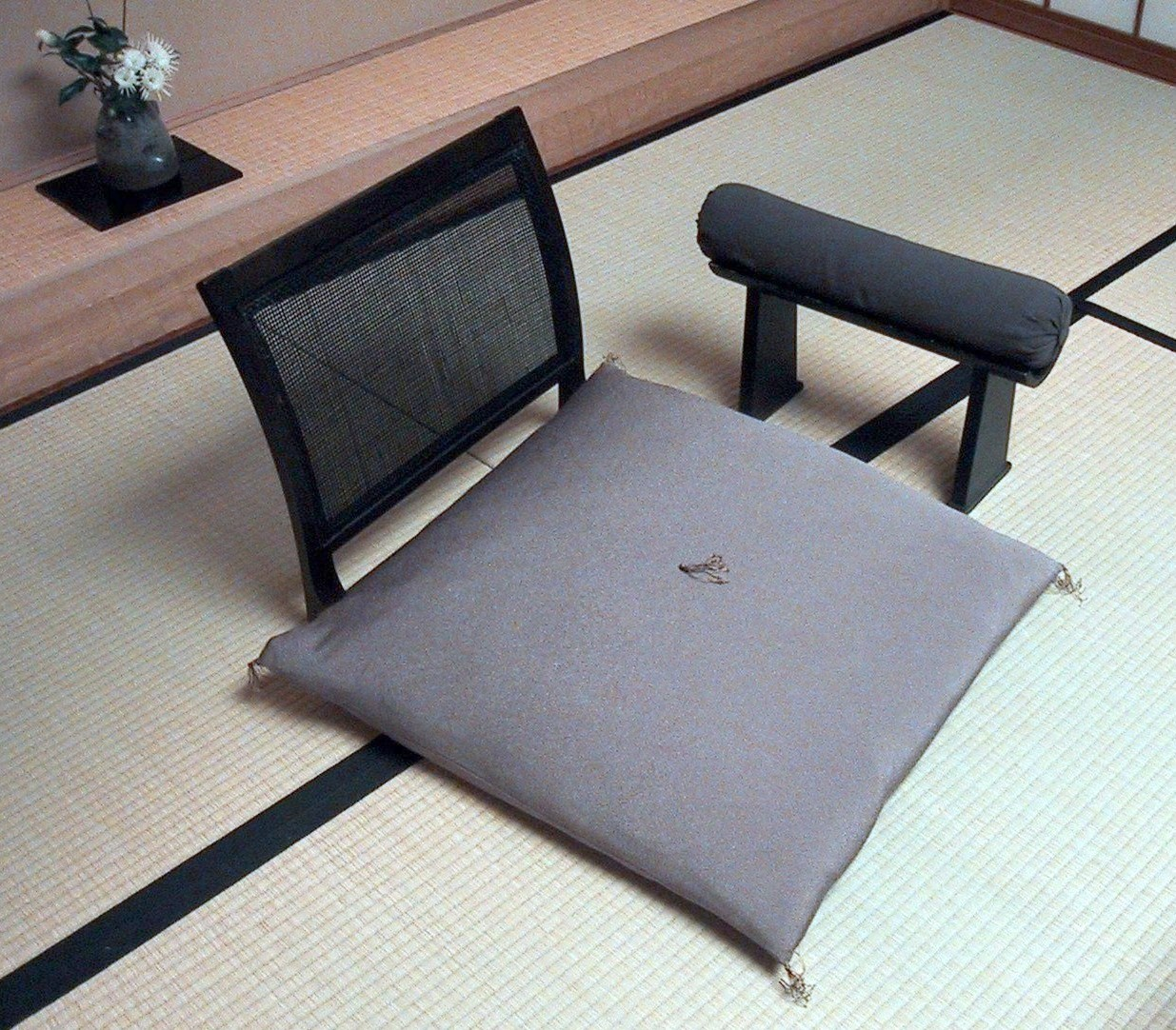
Traditional Japanese chair with a zabuton and a separate armrest

A zabuton (kanji: 座布団, hiragana: ざぶとん, lit. 'sitting futon', pronounced [dzabɯꜜtoɴ]) is a cushion for sitting that is commonly used in traditional Japanese settings. Zabuton is a Japanese loanword that is also sometimes used in Western culture to describe the zaniku, a flat mat that a zafu is placed on.

The zabuton is generally used while sitting in a seiza or agura position and may also be used when sitting on a chair. Zabuton are used during meditation such as zazen. In a more casual setting, the zabuton can be used in conjunction with a zaisu, a type of Japanese legless chair, with or without an accompanying kyōsoku (脇息), a Japanese-style armrest. Ordinarily, any place in Japan where seating is on the floor will be provided with zabuton for sitting comfort. The dimensions of a zabuton can vary, but are typically approximately 2 feet (0.61 m) to 3 feet (0.91 m) square and usually an inch or two thick. They are sometimes made with threaded embroidery and tassels on the four corners and at the center of the zabuton, and often with a removable outer cover that can be washed separately.

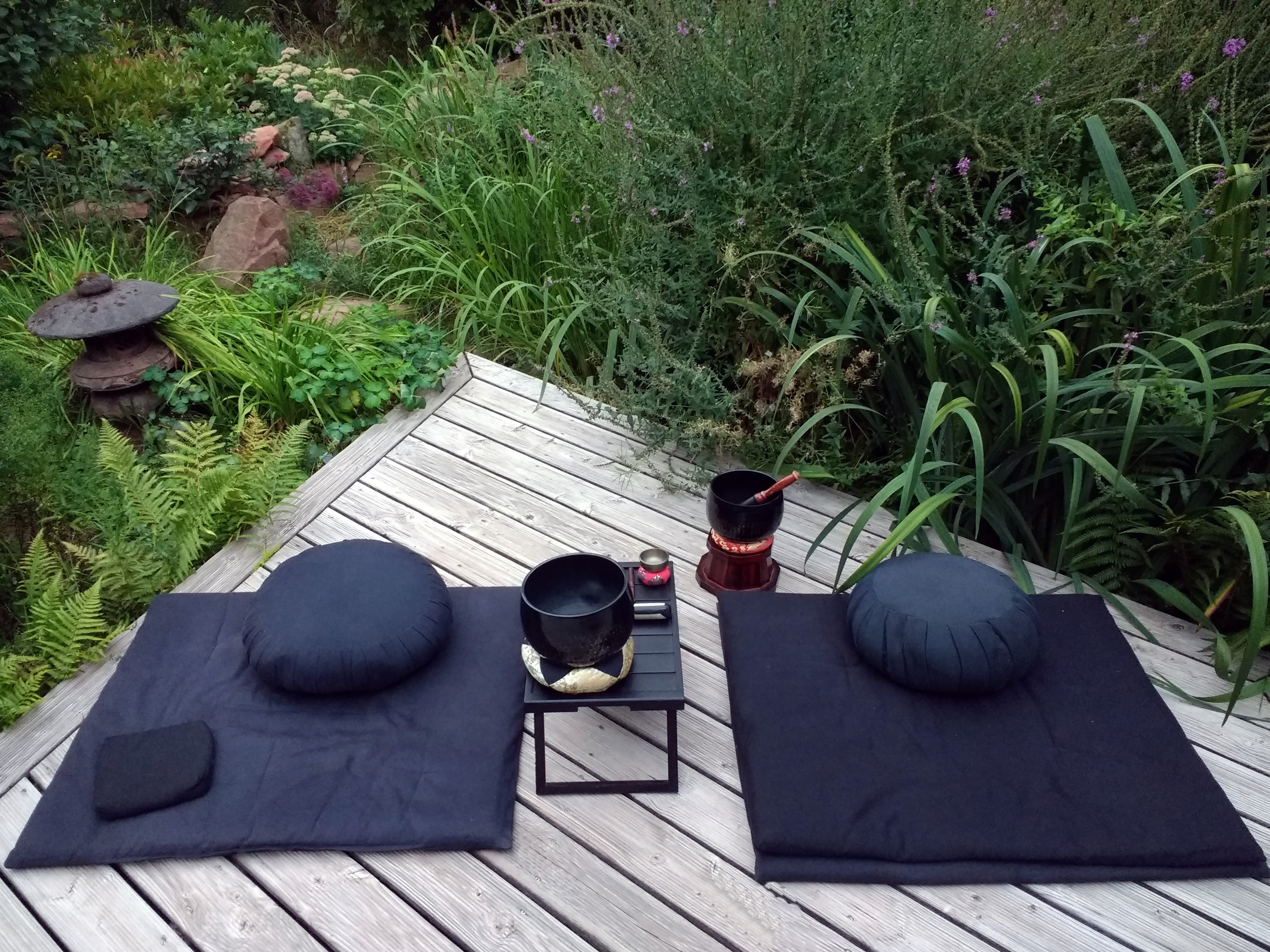
Zafu and Zabuton for sitting meditation (Zazen)

== History ==
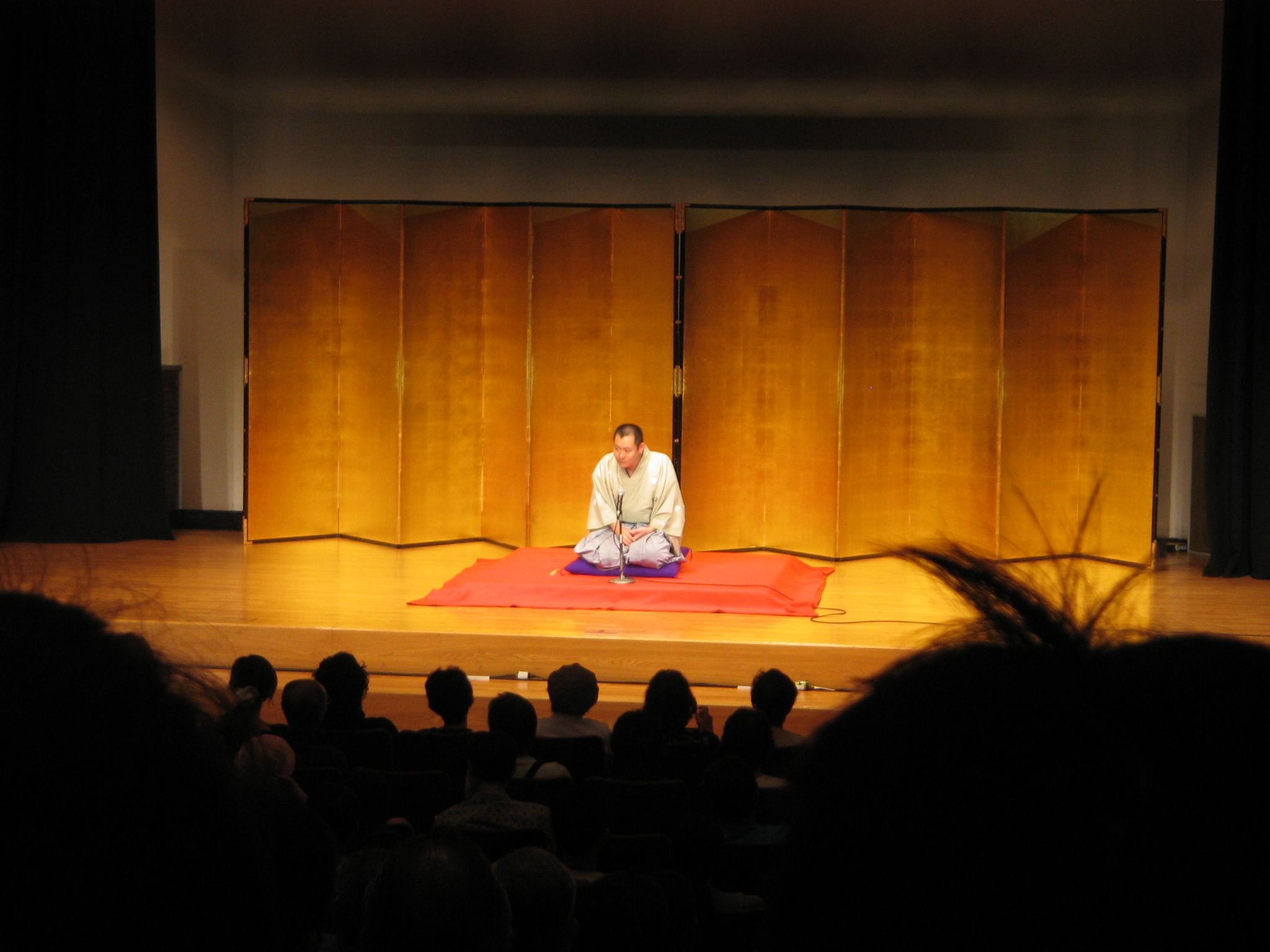
A zabuton used during a rakugo performance

Zabuton are typically packed with cotton for cushioning, with an outer cover made of fabric, usually also cotton. The outer cover is sometimes alternatively made of a variety of other materials such as silk, linen, leather, or washi. Zabuton were commonly made using meisen until the 1960s when meisen production ceased.

The zabuton originates from an earlier type of cushion called a shitone (Japanese: 褥), used in early Japan by the aristocratic class. A shitone is roughly the same size and shape as a zabuton, but consists of layers of straw matting covered with cloth as opposed to the cotton-filled zabuton. One traditional method of making a zabuton involves layered cotton stuffing laid on top of a square piece of fabric, folded in half with two sides stitched closed. The bundle is then rolled and then turned inside out so that the stuffing is inside the fabric, rather than stuffing the fabric into an opening in the cloth.

Prior to the introduction of zabuton, enza (Japanese: 円座, lit. 'round seats') were commonly used as cushioning on wooden floors. These were circular, plaited grass cushions that were gradually replaced in everyday usage by the shitone and zabuton during the Edo period (1600–1868) after cotton was introduced to Japan.

== Cultural usage ==
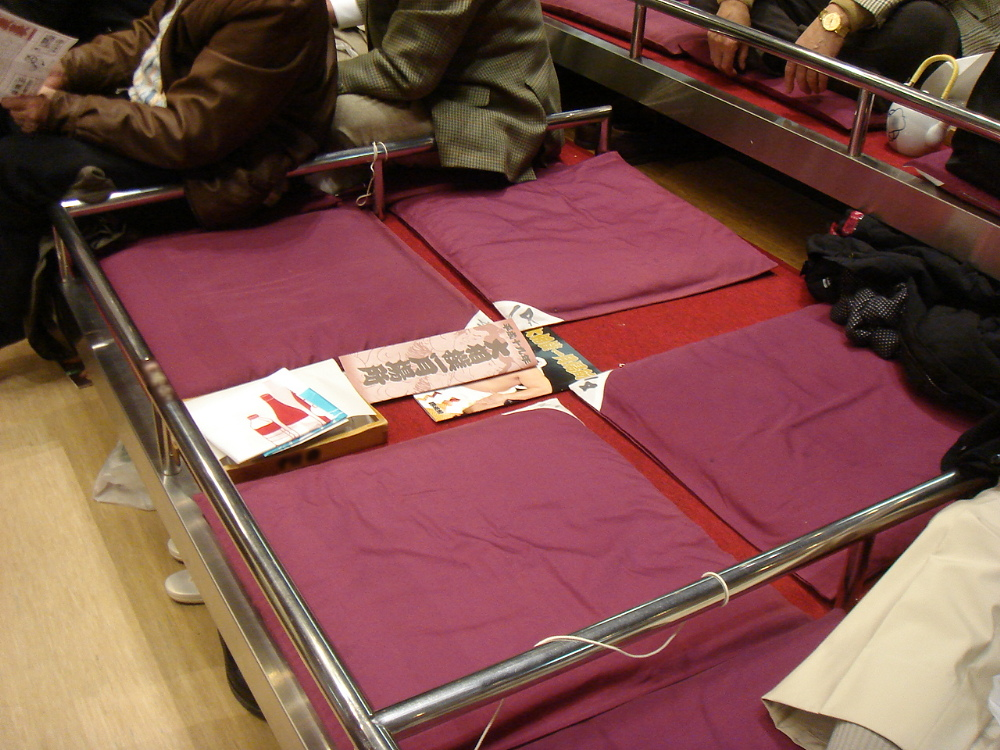
A sumo box seat

Japanese culture has societal norms and etiquette around zabuton, including the proper way to accept a zabuton and the correct way to sit or rise from one, and how to bow when seated on one. The placement of a person's zabuton in a room can indicate that person's position in a social hierarchy or a position of honor.

In Zen meditation, practitioners sit on a zafu, which is typically placed on top of a zabuton. The zabuton serves to cushion the knees and ankles while the zafu supports and cushions the rest of the body. This combination of zabuton and zafu is used to support the body during long periods of meditation, especially for those who are unaccustomed to being in the seiza position for long periods of time.

In sumo, members of the audience throw zabuton toward the ring after a yokozuna is defeated by a lower-ranked wrestler, as a way of heckling the defeated wrestler in a practice called Zabuton-wo-nageru (Japanese: 座布団を投げる, lit. 'throwing zabuton cushions'). Throwing zabuton in this fashion has risks, including the potential for causing personal injury and damage to property.

In yose, notably on the long-running television show Shōten, comedians receive zabuton as a form of scoring, which are also taken away as punishment for bad jokes. The first comedian on Shōten to receive ten zabuton is declared the winner. Zabuton are used in rakugo by both the performer and the audience. Before adopting Western-style chairs in the 1930s, Japanese movie theatres used zabuton for patron seating.
