= Throw pillow =

Small, decorative soft furnishing item

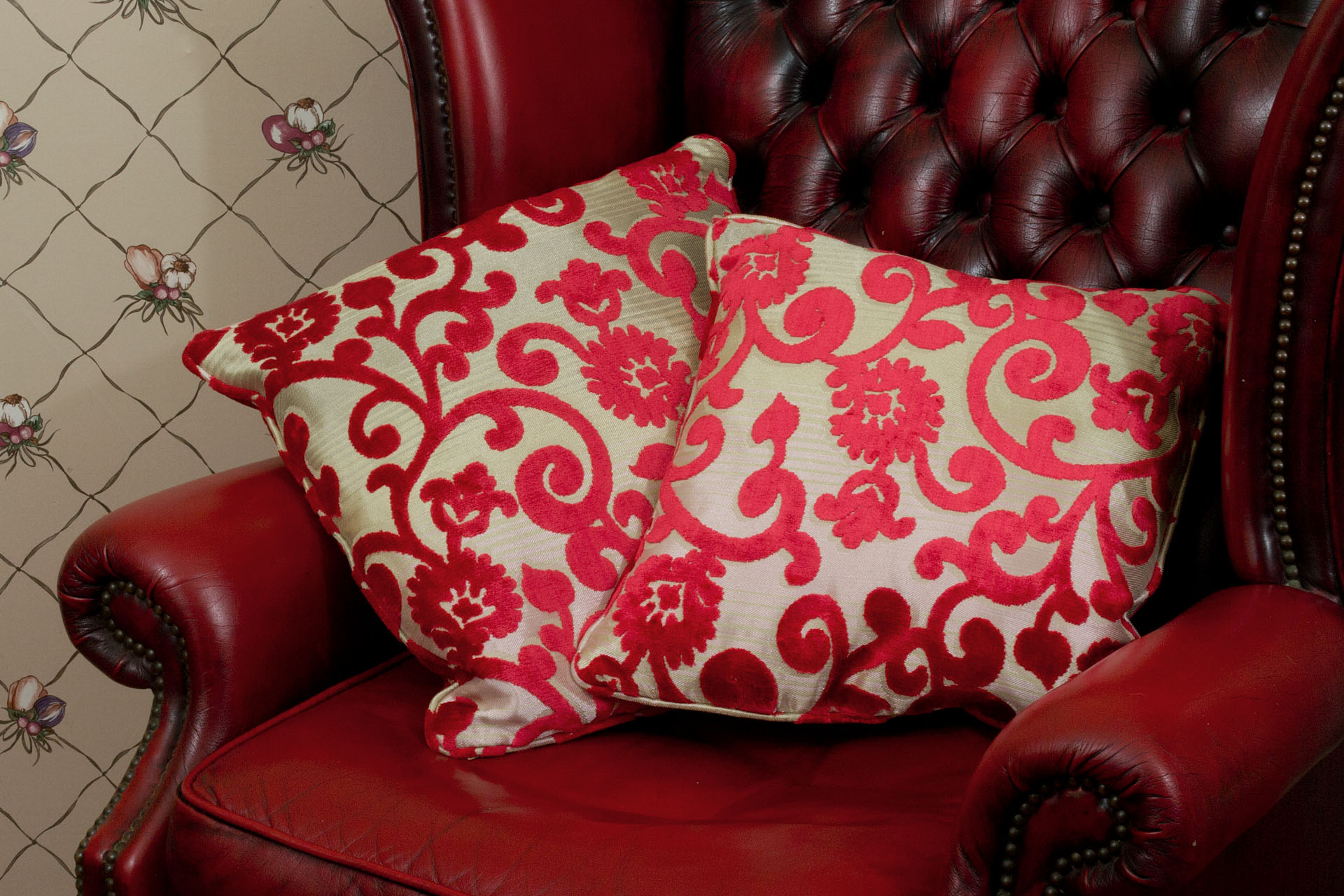
Square throw pillows (scatter cushions).

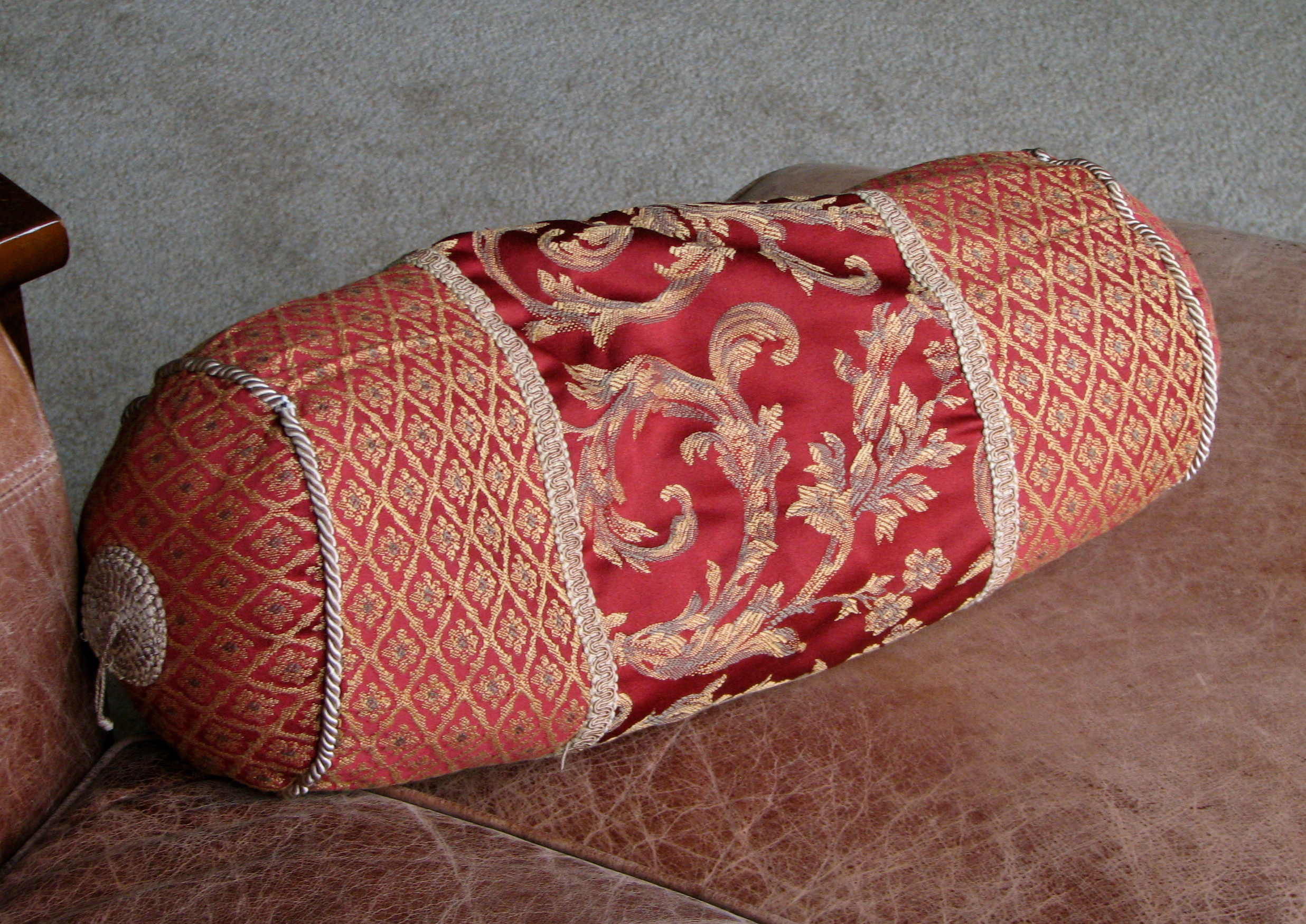
A typical throw pillow.

A throw pillow, or toss pillow, is a small, decorative soft furnishing item made from a wide range of textiles including cotton, linen, silk, leather, microfibre, suede, chenille, and velvet. Throw pillows are commonly used in interior design and come in various shapes, sizes, and decorative elements such as tassels and piped edges. The most common throw pillow designs are square and range from 16 to 24 inches. In the UK, a throw pillow is more commonly referred to as a scatter cushion.
