= Kapok fibre =

Plant fibre from the seed pods of some trees in the Malvaceae family

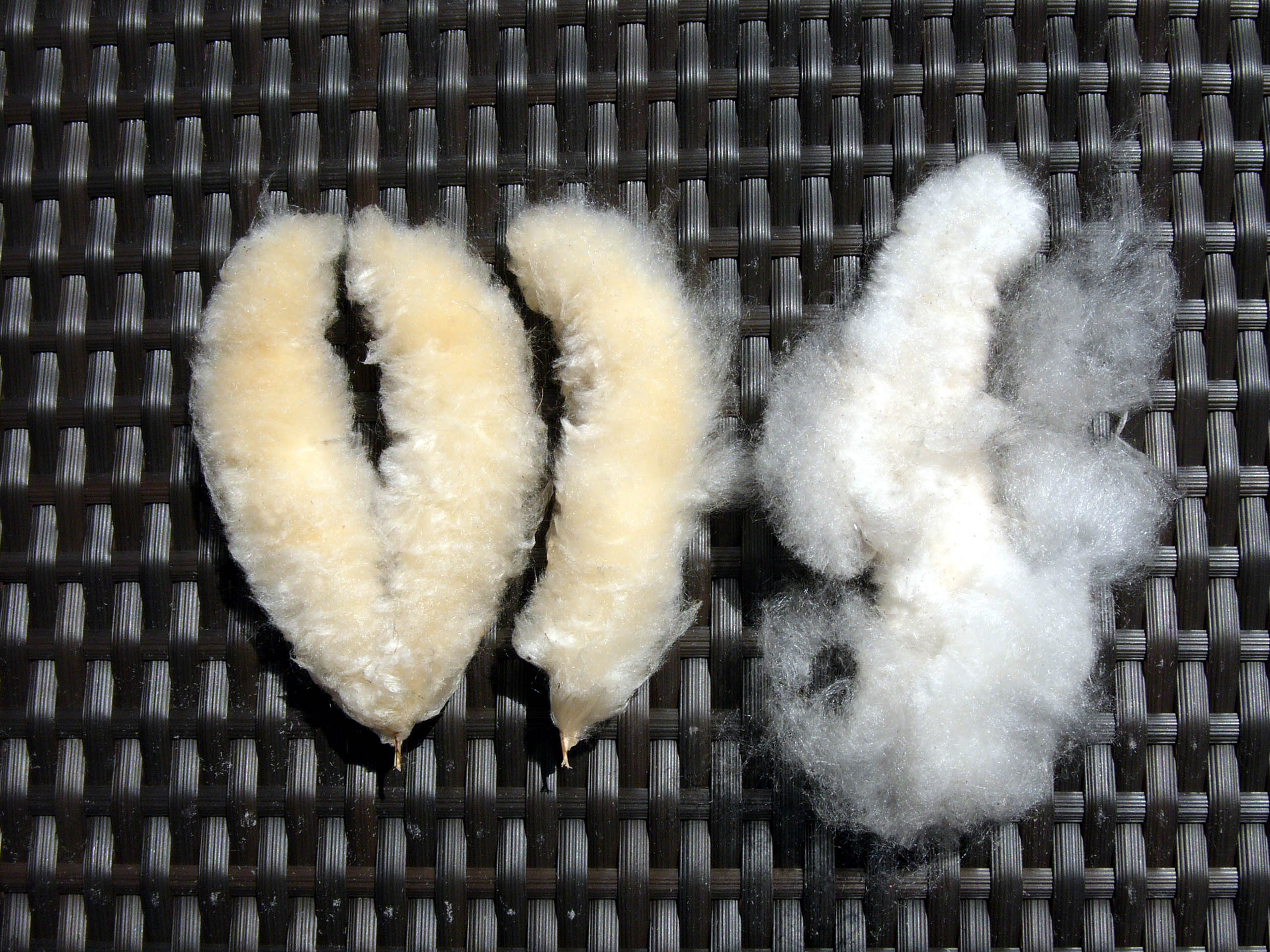
Kapok fibres

Kapok, or Kapok fibre, also known as ceiba and Java cotton, is the fine fibre from the fruit of the kapok tree Ceiba pentandra in the bombax family Bombacaceae.

== Description ==
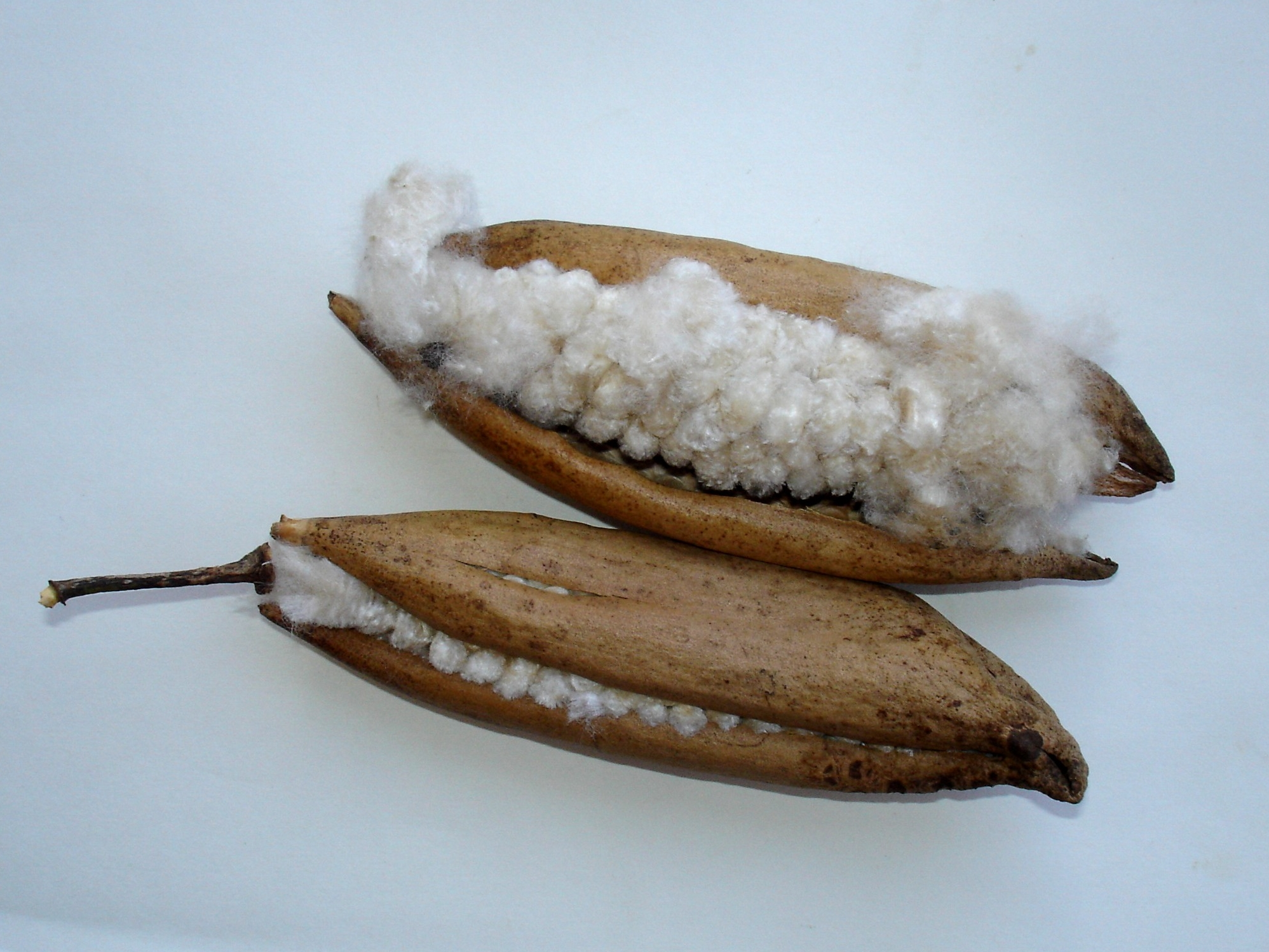
Kapok pods

Kapok is a fibrous material classified along with cotton, as plant hairs or seed fibres, unicellular fibres that develop on the inside of the fruit bags.

The kapok fibres are 10 to 35 mm (3/8 to 1 3/8 in) in length and are brittle due to lignification, and only spinnable when blended with other fibres, usually cotton. The fibres are water-repellent (hydrophobic) and have good thermal insulation properties. Colour may be white, pale gray, or yellowish to brown. The fibres are easily biodegradable, but not subject to much insect infestation.

The microscopic structure of kapok is significantly different from cotton. It has a hollow tube structure consisting of about 35% cellulose and nanocellulose, 22% xylan and 21.5% lignin in the dry fibre, as well as pectin and wax. The fibre is hydrophobic due to a fairly high fat content and is not wetted by water, but is absorptive of oil at a level of 40 g/g or 40 oz/oz of fibre from an oil suspension in water. A kapok fibre is a thin-walled hollow tube with a diameter of about 15 to 35 μm (0.59 to 1.38 mils) and wall thickness about 1 to 2 μm (0.039 to 0.079 mils), filled with up to 80% air by volume, giving it a density of about 1/8 that of cotton fibre.

The fibres are not known to cause allergic reactions and are comfortable to wear.

== Production ==
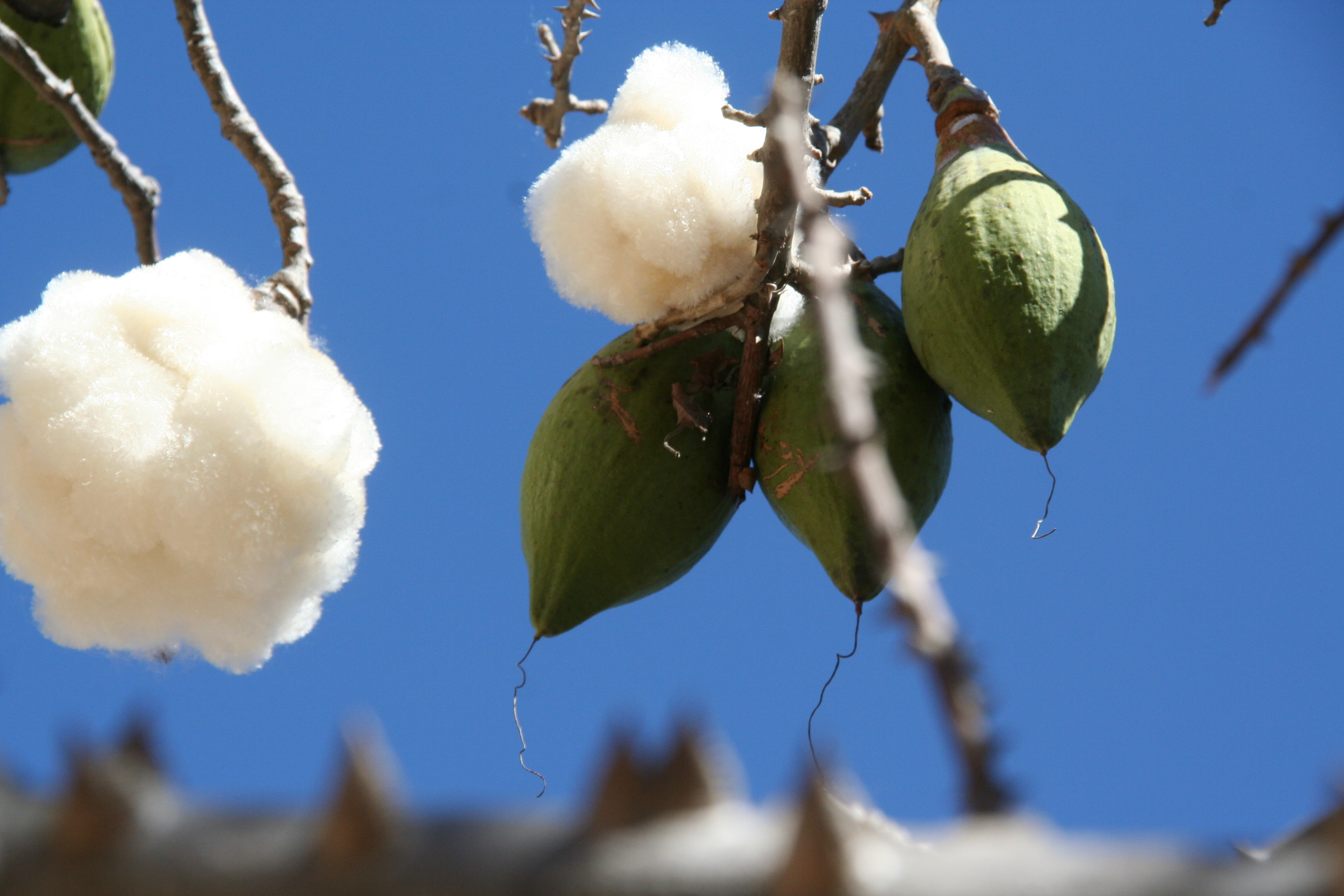
Kapok bolls in opened pods, still on the tree in Mexico.

Kapok is grown and exported from Nigeria, Mozambique, and Tanzania in Africa, Sri Lanka, Indonesia, Thailand, and the Philippines in Asia, and Ecuador in South America.

The product is transported in bales of about 100 kg (220 lb), but at low compression to prevent excessive compaction. Kapok can spontaneously combust, and is rated as a flammable solid.

== Uses ==
Kapok fibers can be used as fill for pillows, quilts and other bedding, upholstery, and soft toys. It is also good thermal and acoustic insulation.

Kapok was used as a filling for life jackets because of its low density, due to the air-filled lumen and low wetting. After extended immersion in water, the buoyancy is only slightly reduced.

By-products, such as shoots, oil, leaves and fruit, are used as food, for medicinal preparations, particularly in traditional medicine, and as animal feed.
