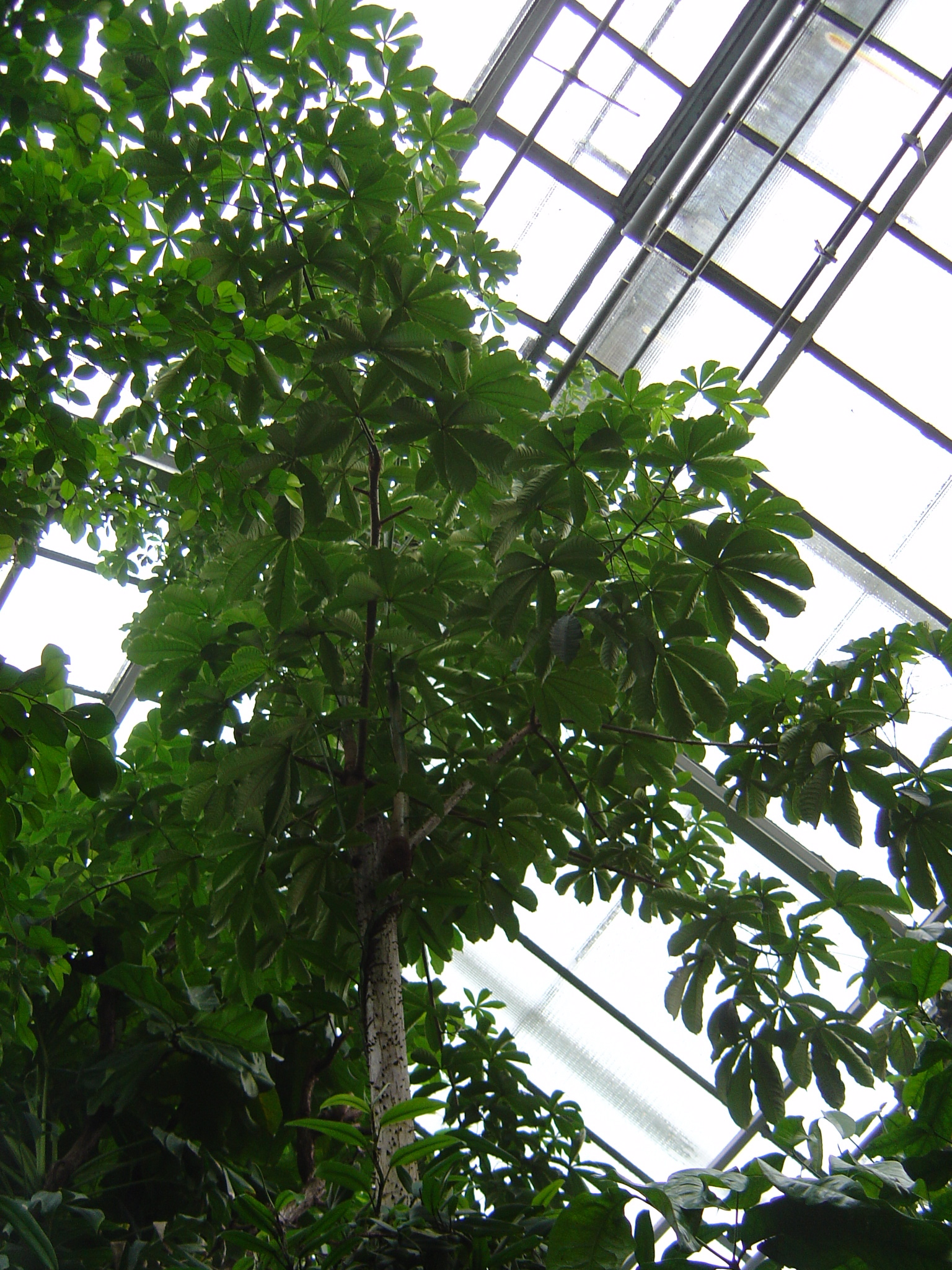
- Greenhouse-grown specimen in Münster, Germany

Conservation status
- Least Concern (IUCN 3.1)

Scientific classification
- Kingdom: Plantae
- Clade: Tracheophytes
- Clade: Angiosperms
- Clade: Eudicots
- Clade: Rosids
- Order: Malvales
- Family: Malvaceae
- Genus: Bombax
- Species: B. buonopozense

Binomial name
- Bombax buonopozense P.Beauv. (1816)

Subspecies
- Bombax buonopozense subsp. buonopozense; Bombax buonopozense subsp. reflexum (Sprague) A.Robyns

Synonyms
- Gossampinus buonopozensis (P.Beauv.) Bakh. (1924)

= Bombax buonopozense =

Species of tree

Bombax buonopozense, commonly known as the Gold Coast bombax or red-flowered silk cotton tree, is a tree in the mallow family. It is also known in the Dagbani language as Vabga (plural Vabsi).

It is native primarily in West Africa, where it is found in rainforests from Sierra Leone in the northwest, east to Uganda and south to Angola, typically at elevations of 900 to 1200 metres. A large tree, it often reaches heights of 40 metres (130 feet) with buttress roots up to 6 metres (20 feet) in diameter. The bark of younger trees is covered with spines and large, deep pink-to-red flowers emerge while the tree is leafless.

Various parts of the plant are used for medicinal purposes, as food, as a source of clothing fibre, as a building material, and as a dye. The fruits are eaten by animals such as the water chevrotain.

== Description ==
Bombax buonopozense is a large tropical pioneer tree that grows to 40 metres (130 feet) in height with large buttress roots that can spread 6 metres (20 feet). The bark is covered in large, conical spines, especially when young, but shedding them with age to some degree. The branches are arranged in whorls. The leaves are compound and have 5 to 9 leaflets and 15 to 25 secondary veins. They are set on long petioles that typically measure between 22 and 14 cm. The individual leaflets have entire margins and are also quite large, measuring from 8 to 23 cm in length by 3 to 7.5 cm in width. The undersides of the leaflets may be either glabrous (i.e. hairless) or puberulous (i.e. very finely haired). The buds are conical.

The conspicuous flowers emerge while the tree is leafless and are either solitary or arranged in small axillary cymes. The truncate calyx, that is the whorl of sepals, is 1 to 1.6 cm high and is cupuliform, or cup-shaped. It is also deciduous, meaning that it does not persist on the fruit. The petals are deep pink or red in colour and are 5.5 to 9.5 cm in length by 2.5 to 3.7 cm in width. The numerous stamens are arranged in bundles with two whorls. A curiosity of these flowers is that they fill with rainwater, and provide a home for aquatic creatures. The fruits are oblong and fairly large, being 8 to 18 cm in length by 3.5 to 6 cm in diameter. They are glabrous, either rigged or angular, and loculicidal, meaning that they open spontaneously at maturity along the capsule wall in between the sections of the locule. They contain many seeds that are 5 to 6 mm in length, all of which have a woolly indument, that is a cotton-like fibre covering.

== Subspecies ==
Two subspecies are accepted:

- Bombax buonopozense subsp. buonopozense (synonyms Bombax angulicarpum Ulbr., Bombax buesgenii Ulbr., Bombax buonopozense var. cristata A.Chev., Bombax flammeum Ulbr., Gossampinus angulicarpa (Ulbr.) Bakh., Gossampinus buesgenii (Ulbr.) Bakh., and Gossampinus flammea (Ulbr.) Bakh.) – Sierra Leone to Uganda and Angola
- Bombax buonopozense subsp. reflexum (Sprague) A.Robyns (synonyms Bombax buonopozense var. velutinum Robyns, Bombax reflexum Sprague, and Gossampinus reflexa (Sprague) Bakh.) – Cameroon and Central African Republic to Angola

== Uses ==
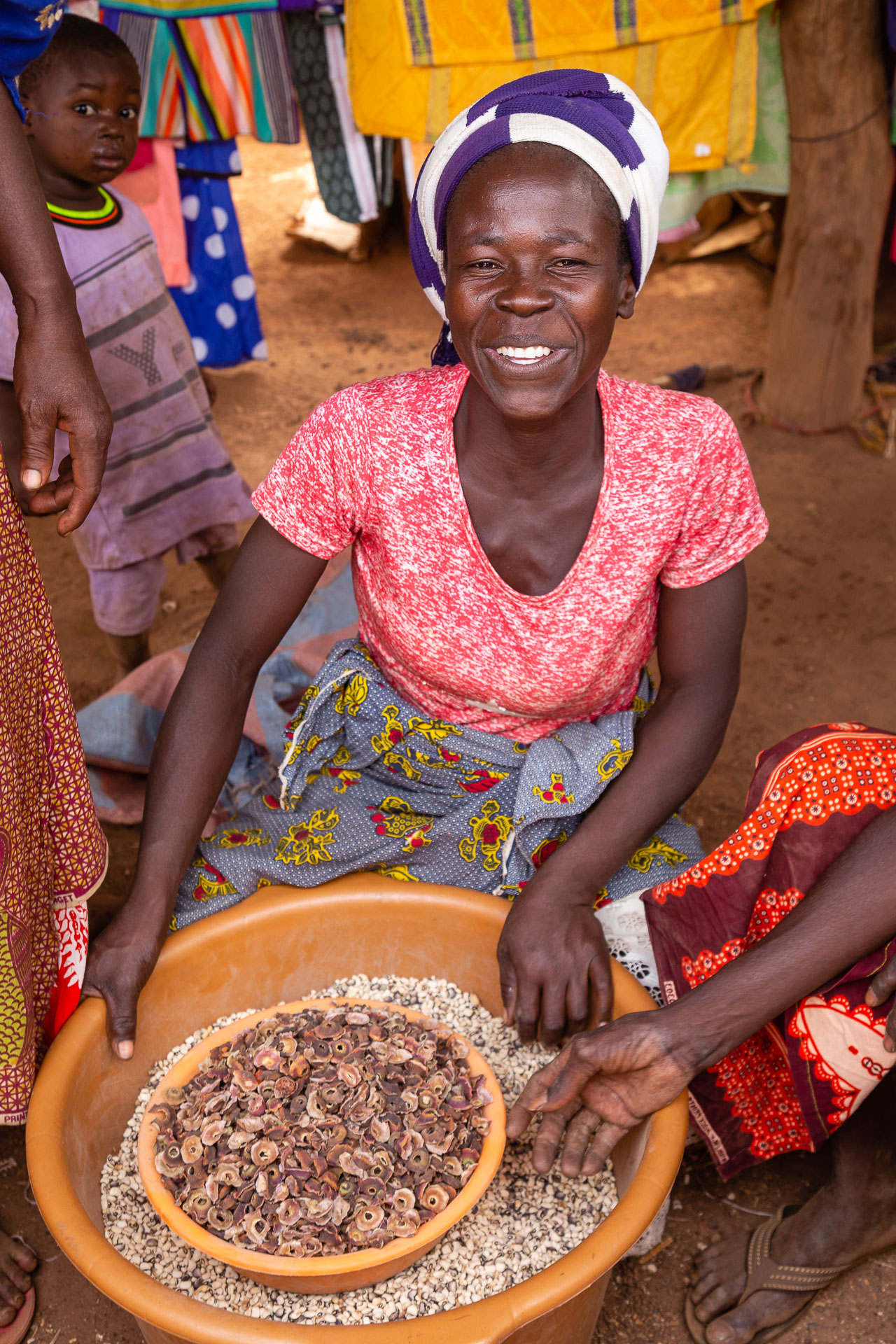
A Konkomba woman sells dried calyces of Bombax buonopozense in Gbintiri, Ghana.

Many parts of the plant are utilised for medicinal and traditional purposes. In Ghana, where it is native, the leaves are common as fodder for domestic livestock. The bark is burnt to produce a smoke that is believed to drive away evil spirits called alizini in Dagbani. The abundant thorns present on the bark are burnt and the resulting charcoal is mixed with butter to treat swelling. Dried gum produced from the tree is used as an incense. Various parts of the plant have also been used as contraceptives or abortifacients.

The wood is quite light, which limits its uses to canoes and other implements. A dye can be made from the tannins within the bark, while the cotton-like fibre that covers the seeds is gathered and used as a cotton substitute. It cannot be spun, however, so its use is limited to a stuffing for pillows and clothing. Both the flowers and the young fruits are used in food. Various ethnic groups of northern Ghana such as the Mamprusi and Konkomba people dry and grind the flowers' calyces and use them in a soup (comparable to the use of calyces of the Sahelian red-flowered kapok tree, Bombax costatum).
