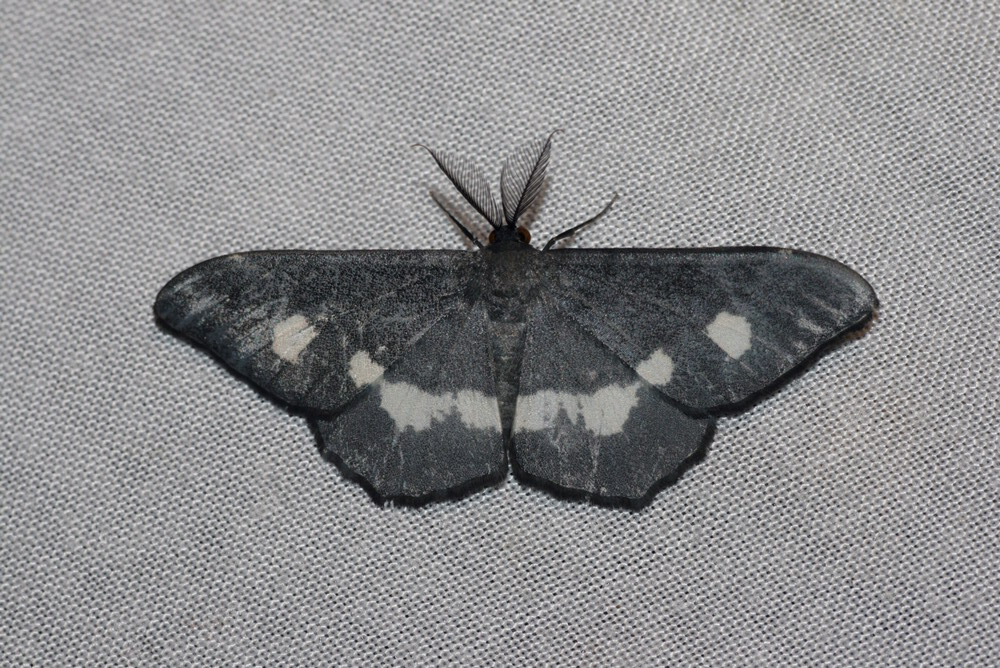
- Hyposidra picaria

Scientific classification
- Kingdom: Animalia
- Phylum: Arthropoda
- Class: Insecta
- Order: Lepidoptera
- Family: Geometridae
- Tribe: Boarmiini
- Genus: Hyposidra; Guenée, 1857

Type species
- Hyposidra janiaria Guenée, 1857

= Hyposidra =

Genus of moths

Hyposidra is a genus of moths in the family Geometridae first described by Achille Guenée in 1857.

== Description ==
Palpi hairy and reaching beyond the frons. Antennae of male usually bipectinate (comb like on both sides) with long branches to three-fourths length. Hind tibia rarely dilated and fringed with hair. Forewings of male with fovea. The costa arched towards apex, which is much produced. Vein 3 from just before angle of cell. The discocellulars angled below vein 5. Veins 7 to 9 stalked, from before upper angle and curved. Veins 10 and 11 usually stalked. Female with costa evenly arched. The outer margin excised below apex. Vein 3 from angle of cell and vein 5 obsolescent. Vein 10 and 11 coincident. Hindwings with vein 3 from angle of cell.

== Species ==
Some species of this genus are:

- Hyposidra altiviolescens (Holloway, 1993) — Borneo
- Hyposidra apicifulva (Warren, 1907) — New Guinea
- Hyposidra apioleuca (Prout, 1916) — Peninsular Malaysia, Sumatra & Borneo
- Hyposidra aquilaria (Walker, [1863]) — China to Borneo
- Hyposidra castaneorufa (Rothschild 1915) — New Guinea
- Hyposidra incomptaria (Walker, 1866) — Malaysia to Solomons
- Hyposidra infixaria (Walker, 1860) — Himalaya to Taiwan and Sundaland
- Hyposidra janiaria (Guenée, 1857) — Java to Australia
- Hyposidra leucomela (Walker, 1866) — Philippines
- Hyposidra nigricosta (Warren, 1896) — Indonesia/Moluccas
- Hyposidra picaria (Walker, 1866) — Sundaland
- Hyposidra plagosa (Rothschild, 1915) — New Guinea
- Hyposidra rufosarcuata (Holloway, 1993) — Sumatra & Borneo
- Hyposidra talaca (Walker, 1860) — India to Solomons
- Hyposidra violescens (Hampson, 1895) — Himalaya to Borneo

== Former species ==
- Hyposidra muscula Bastelberger, 1911
