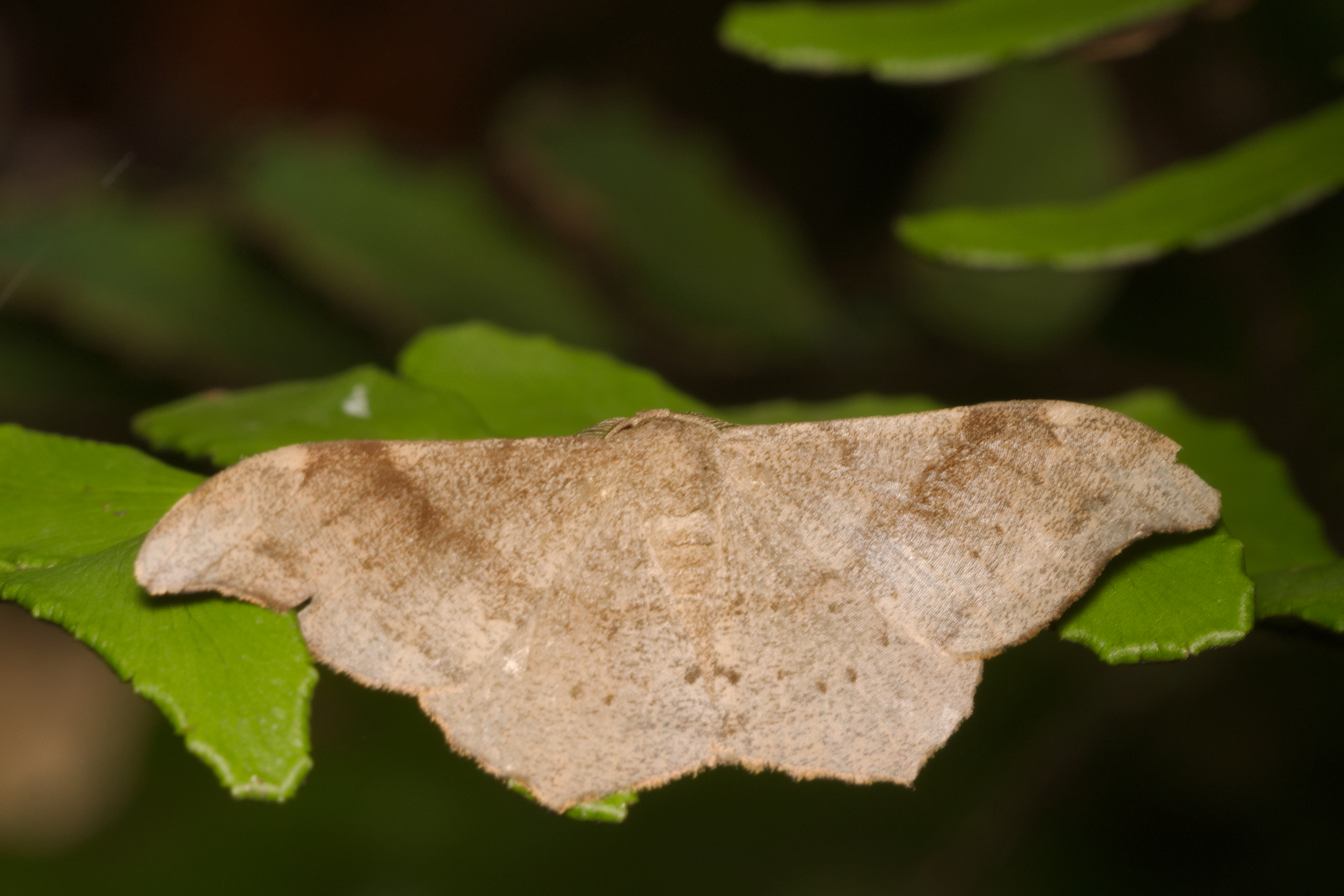

Scientific classification
- Kingdom: Animalia
- Phylum: Arthropoda
- Class: Insecta
- Order: Lepidoptera
- Family: Geometridae
- Genus: Hyposidra
- Species: H. talaca

Binomial name
- Hyposidra talaca (Walker, 1860)

Synonyms
- Lagyra talaca Walker, 1860; Lagyra bombycaria Walker, 1866; Chizala deceptatura Walker, 1860; Chizala decipiens Walker, 1860; Lagyra flaccida Lucas, 1894; Hyposidra grisea Warren, 1902; Hyposidra khasiana Warren, 1894; Lagyra myciterna Druce, 1888; Lagyra rigusaria Walker, 1863; Hyposidra vampyraria Snellen, 1880; Hyposidra schistacea Warren, 1896; Lagyra successaria Walker, 1860; Lagyra humiferata Walker, 1863

= Hyposidra talaca =

Black looper

Species of moth

Hyposidra talaca, the black looper or black inch worm, is a moth of the family Geometridae. The species was first described by Francis Walker in 1860. It is found from India to Indochina, Sundaland, Sulawesi, the Philippines, Sri Lanka, the Solomon Islands, Thailand, Taiwan, New Guinea and Australia, where it has been recorded from Queensland. It is a major defoliating pest in tea plantations.

== Description ==
The wingspan is about 30 mm. Female with outer margin of hindwings hardly crenulate. Male with outer margin of neither wing excised. Antennae pectinated. Hindwings with outer margin angled at vein 4. Body dark olive fuscous, more or less irrorated and suffused with grey. Both wings faint traces of medial and crenulate postmedial lines. The cilia dark. Forewings with traces of antemedial line and more or less distinct sub-apical patch in male. Underside with crenulate postmedial line to both wings.

Larva is a looper, with body pinkish olive green, irrorated with black, and with dark patches on 4th and 6th somites. Later instars are uniform brown.

The larvae feed on the foliage of a wide range of plants, including Anacardium, Bombax, Terminalia, Chromolaena, Gynura, Mikania, Cupressus, Aleurites, Aporosa, Bischofia, Breynia, Glochidion, Hevea, Manihot, Ficus, Morus, Psidium, Polygonum, Rubus, Cinchona, Coffea, Mussaenda, Citrus, Euodia, Schleichera, Theobroma, Perilla frutescens, Camellia and Tectona species.

Eggs and caterpillars are largely susceptible for many parasitized hymenopterans, and birds.

== Subspecies ==
- Hyposidra talaca talaca
- Hyposidra talaca schistacea Warren, 1896
- Hyposidra talaca successaria (Walker, 1860)
