= Ziridava baliensis =

Scientific classification
- Kingdom: Animalia
- Phylum: Arthropoda
- Clade: Pancrustacea
- Class: Insecta
- Order: Lepidoptera
- Family: Geometridae
- Genus: Ziridava
- Species: Z. baliensis

Binomial name
- Ziridava baliensis Prout, 1958

Synonyms
- Ziridava xylinaria baliensis Prout, 1958; Ziridava florensis Prout, 1958

Species of moth

Ziridava baliensis is a moth in the family Geometridae. It is found on Bali and Flores.
