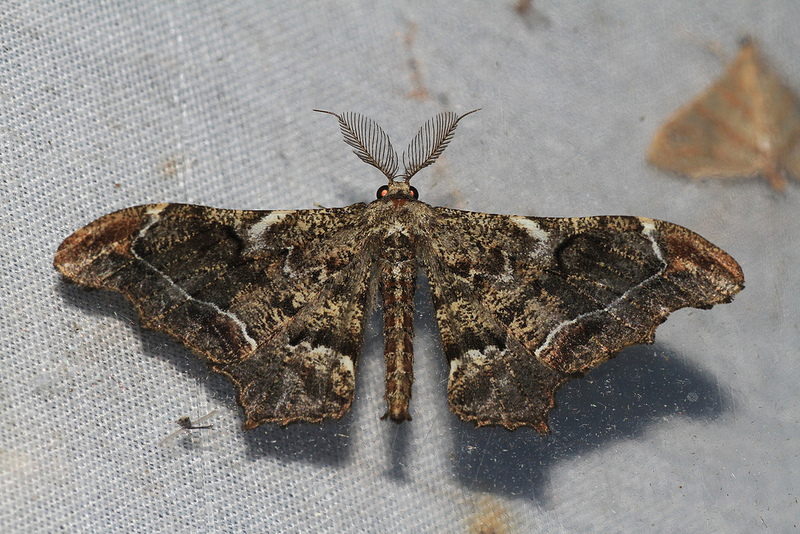
- Borneo, Trusmadi lower montane dipterocarp forest

Scientific classification
- Kingdom: Animalia
- Phylum: Arthropoda
- Class: Insecta
- Order: Lepidoptera
- Family: Geometridae
- Genus: Hyposidra
- Species: H. violescens

Binomial name
- Hyposidra violescens Hampson, 1895

= Hyposidra violescens =

Species of moth

Hyposidra violescens is a geometer moth in the Ennominae subfamily. It is found in Northwestern Himalaya, Northern Vietnam, Northern Thailand, Peninsular Malaysia, Sumatra, and Borneo. The species is infrequent in lowlands and lower montane forests.
