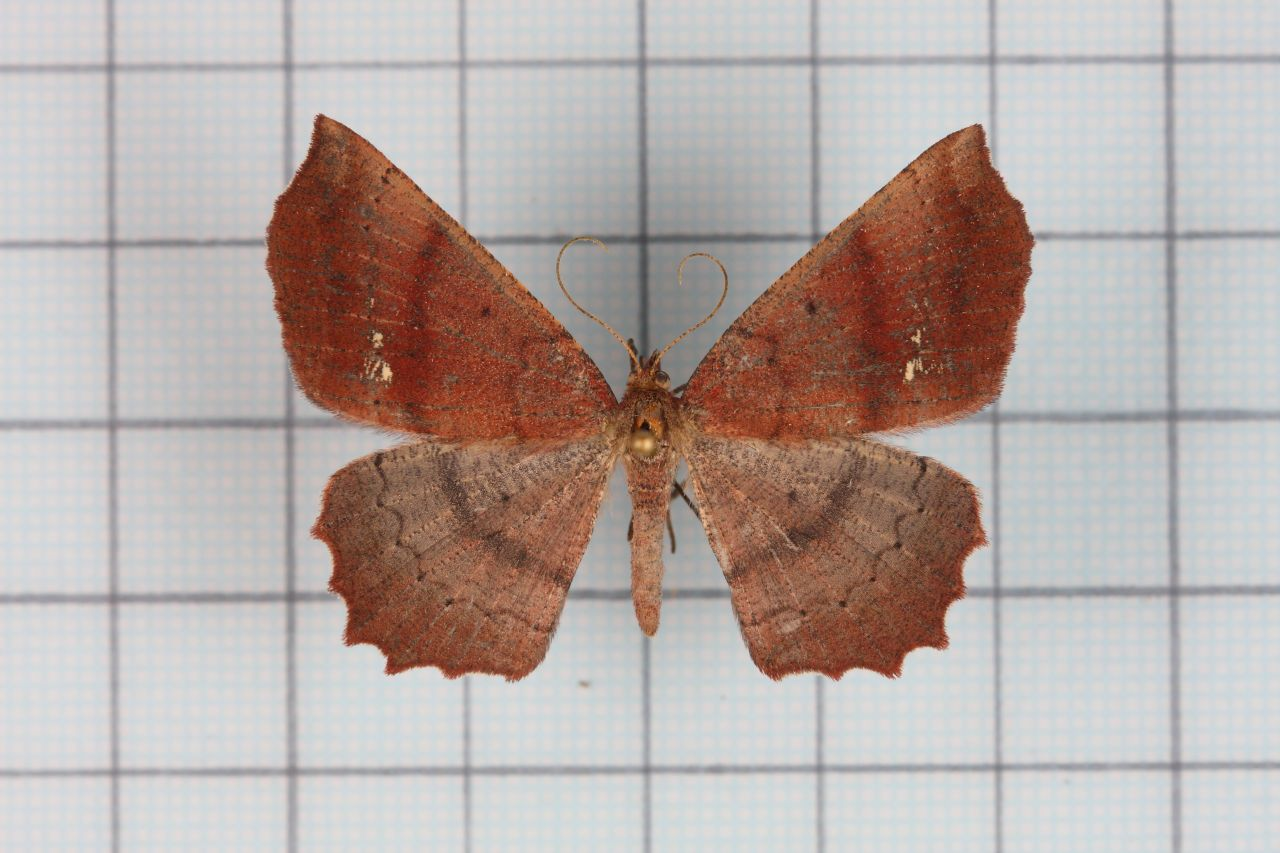

Scientific classification
- Kingdom: Animalia
- Phylum: Arthropoda
- Class: Insecta
- Order: Lepidoptera
- Family: Geometridae
- Subfamily: Ennominae
- Genus: Xerodes; Guenée, 1857

Synonyms
- Gyadroma C. Swinhoe, 1894; Zethenia Motschoulsky, 1861; Zygoctenia Warren, 1895

= Xerodes =

Genus of moths

Xerodes is a genus of moths in the family Geometridae first described by Achille Guenée in 1857.

== Species ==
- Xerodes albisparsa (Warren, 1896)
- Xerodes albonotaria (Bremer, 1864)
- Xerodes cinerosa (Warren, 1895)
- Xerodes contiguaria (Leech, 1897)
- Xerodes crenulata (Wileman, 1915)
- Xerodes inaccepta (Prout, 1910)
- Xerodes lignicolor (Warren, 1897)
- Xerodes pilosa Holloway, 1994
- Xerodes rufescentaria (Motschoulsky, 1861)
- Xerodes sordidata (Inoue, 1987)
- Xerodes ypsaria Guenée, 1857

== Distribution ==
China.
