= Ziridava gemmata =

Scientific classification
- Domain: Eukaryota
- Kingdom: Animalia
- Phylum: Arthropoda
- Class: Insecta
- Order: Lepidoptera
- Family: Geometridae
- Genus: Ziridava
- Species: Z. gemmata

Binomial name
- Ziridava gemmata (Warren, 1899)

Synonyms
- Prorocorys gemmata Warren, 1899; Prorocorys admirabilis Warren, 1903

Species of moth

Ziridava gemmata is a moth in the family Geometridae. It is found on the Solomon Islands and the Bismarck Archipelago.
