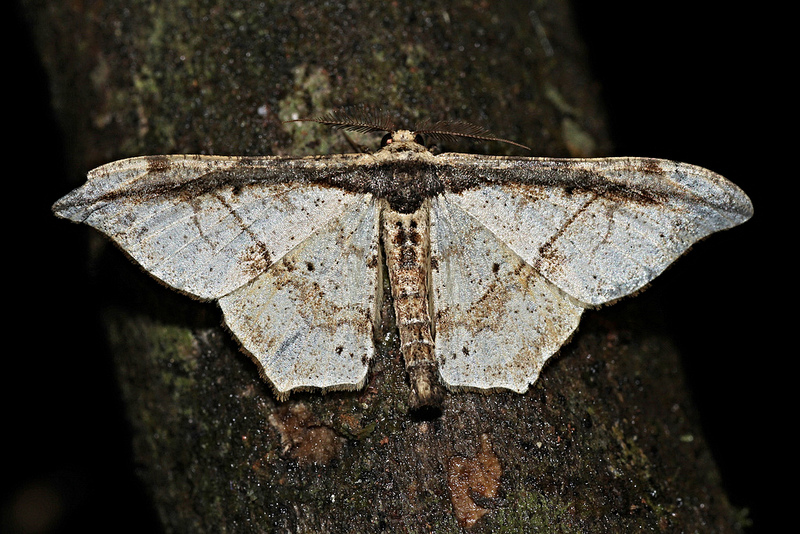
- Borneo, Trusmadi lower montane dipterocarp forest

Scientific classification
- Kingdom: Animalia
- Phylum: Arthropoda
- Clade: Pancrustacea
- Class: Insecta
- Order: Lepidoptera
- Family: Geometridae
- Genus: Hyposidra
- Species: H. infixaria

Binomial name
- Hyposidra infixaria (Walker, 1860)

Synonyms
- Lagyra infixaria Walker, 1860; Macaria aquilaria Walker, [1863]; Chaerodes umbrosa Swinhoe, 1890; Hyposidra virgata Wileman, 1910

= Hyposidra infixaria =

Species of moth

Hyposidra infixaria is a geometer moth in the Ennominae subfamily. It is found in Northwestern Himalaya, Southern China, Taiwan and Sundaland, mainly in lowland forests. There is great variation in wing color, presence or absence of the subcostal line.

The larvae has been reared from Psidium guajava (Myrtaceae), Desmos (Annonaceae), Buchanania (Anacardiaceae) and Punica (Punicaceae).
