= Ziridava asterota =

Scientific classification
- Kingdom: Animalia
- Phylum: Arthropoda
- Clade: Pancrustacea
- Class: Insecta
- Order: Lepidoptera
- Family: Geometridae
- Genus: Ziridava
- Species: Z. asterota

Binomial name
- Ziridava asterota Prout, 1958

Species of moth

Ziridava asterota is a moth in the family Geometridae first described by Louis Beethoven Prout in 1958. It is found on Borneo.
