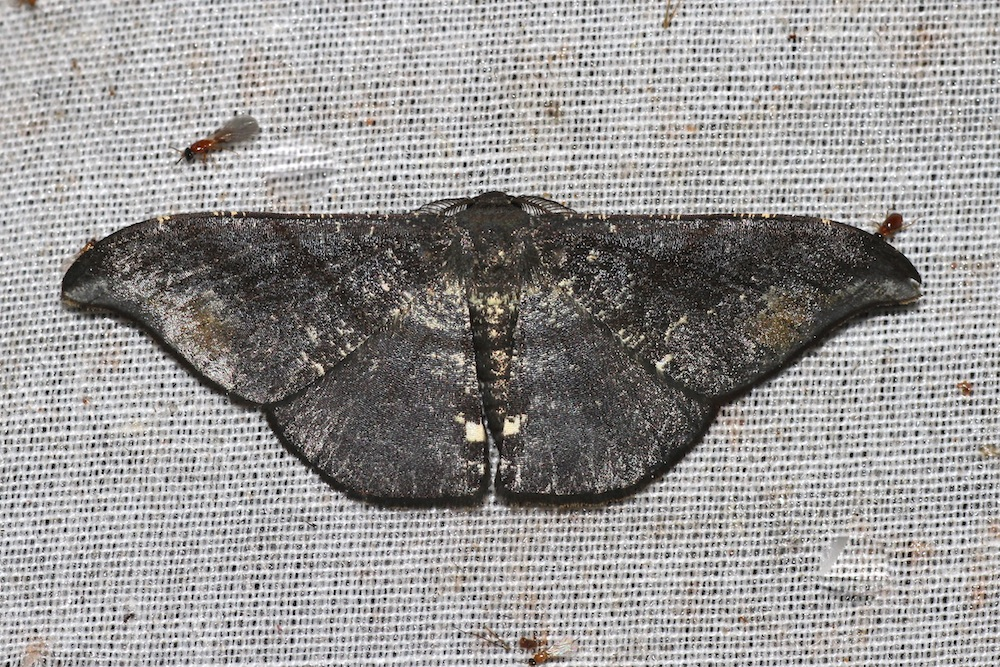
- Borneo, Trusmadi lower montane dipterocarp forest

Scientific classification
- Kingdom: Animalia
- Phylum: Arthropoda
- Class: Insecta
- Order: Lepidoptera
- Family: Geometridae
- Genus: Hyposidra
- Species: H. aquilaria

Binomial name
- Hyposidra aquilaria (Walker, 1862)

Synonyms
- Lagyra aquilaria Walker, 1862; Hyposidra albipunctata Warren, 1893; Hyposidra kala Swinhoe, 1893; Hyposidra davidaria Poujade, 1895

= Hyposidra aquilaria =

Species of moth

Hyposidra aquilaria is a geometer moth in the Ennominae subfamily. It is found in Northwestern Himalaya, Western, Southern and Eastern China, Peninsular Malaysia, Sumatra, and Borneo. It is a rare species of lowland forests.
