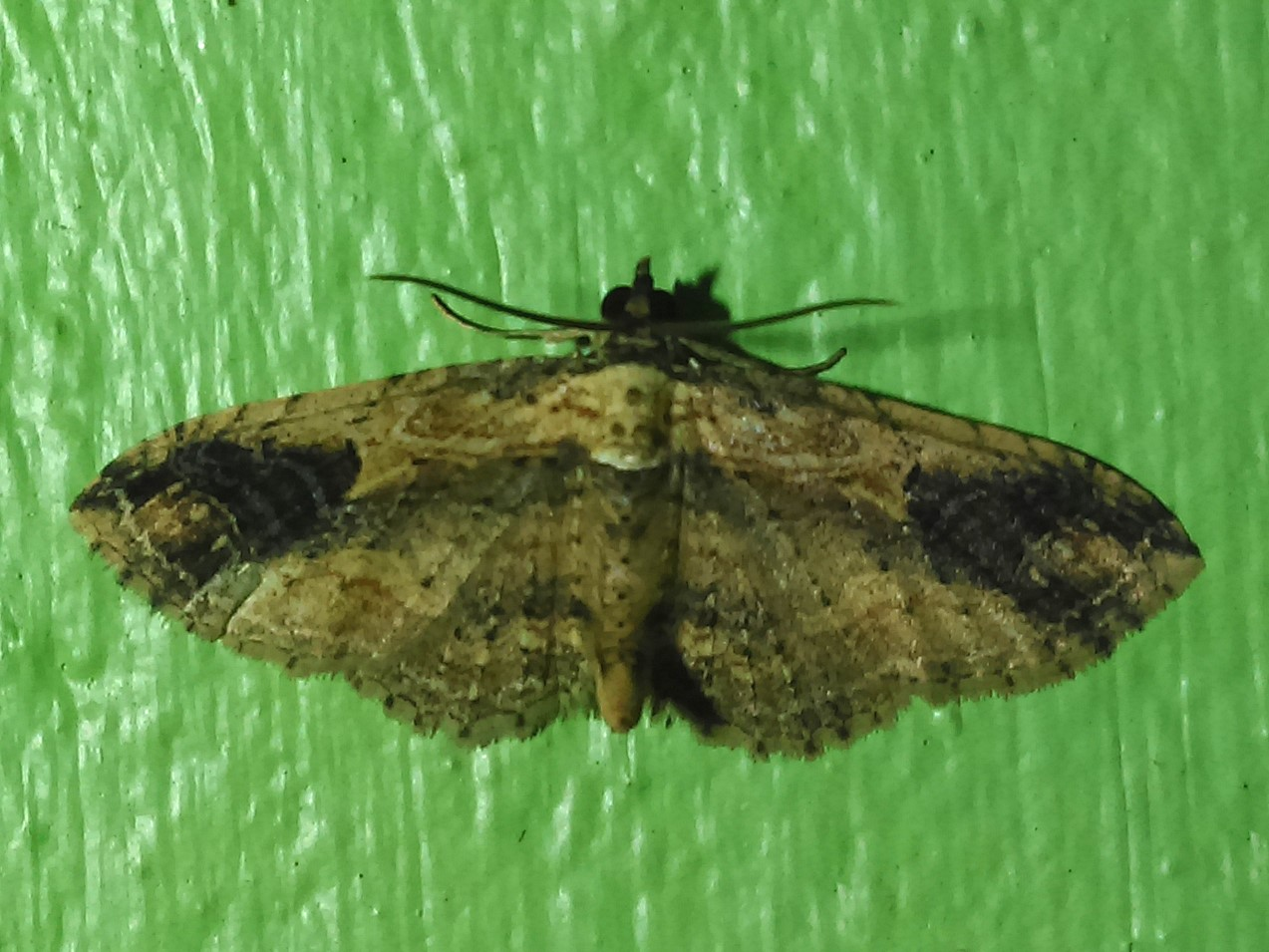

Scientific classification
- Kingdom: Animalia
- Phylum: Arthropoda
- Clade: Pancrustacea
- Class: Insecta
- Order: Lepidoptera
- Family: Geometridae
- Genus: Ziridava
- Species: Z. khasiensis

Binomial name
- Ziridava khasiensis Prout, 1958

= Ziridava khasiensis =

Species of moth

Ziridava khasiensis is a species of moth in the family Geometridae. It is found in the north-eastern Himalayas.
