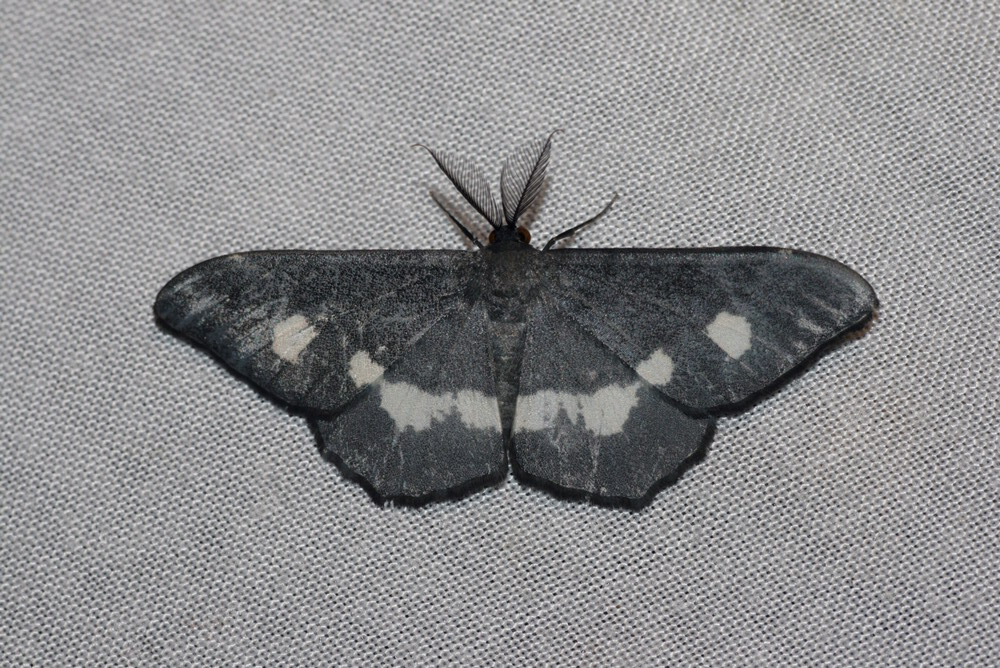
- Borneo, Crocker Range National Park lowland forest

Scientific classification
- Kingdom: Animalia
- Phylum: Arthropoda
- Clade: Pancrustacea
- Class: Insecta
- Order: Lepidoptera
- Family: Geometridae
- Genus: Hyposidra
- Species: H. picaria

Binomial name
- Hyposidra picaria Walker, 1866

Synonyms
- Lagyra picaria Walker, 1866; Hyposidra caesia Warren, 1897; Hyposidra ruptifascia Warren, 1901; Hyposidra lactiflua Prout, 1931

= Hyposidra picaria =

Species of moth

Hyposidra picaria is a geometer moth in the Ennominae subfamily first described by Francis Walker in 1866. It is found throughout Sundaland.

Larvae have been reared on Acacia mangium.
