= Ziridava dysorga =

Scientific classification
- Kingdom: Animalia
- Phylum: Arthropoda
- Clade: Pancrustacea
- Class: Insecta
- Order: Lepidoptera
- Family: Geometridae
- Genus: Ziridava
- Species: Z. dysorga

Binomial name
- Ziridava dysorga Prout, 1928

Species of moth

Ziridava dysorga is a moth in the family Geometridae. It is found on Samoa and the Cook Islands.
