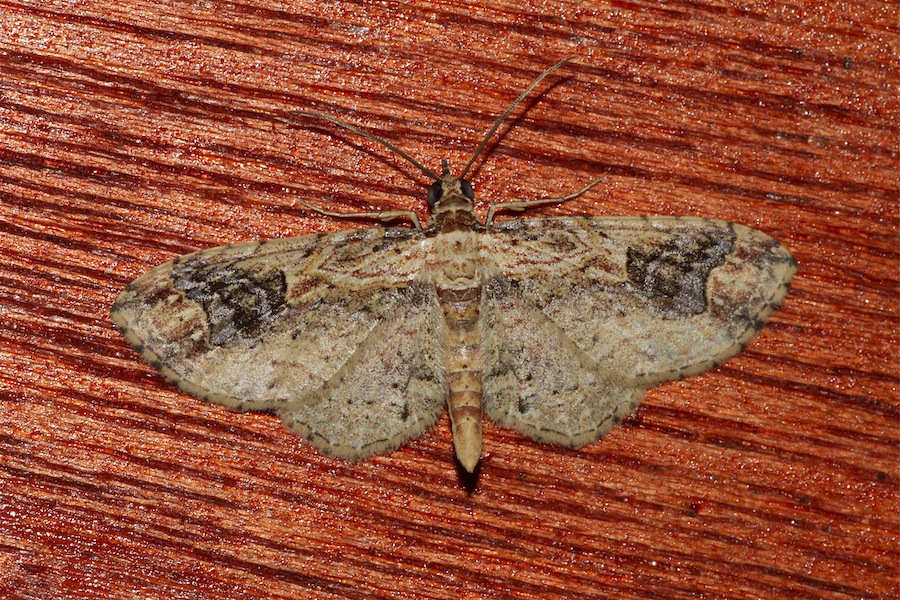

Scientific classification
- Kingdom: Animalia
- Phylum: Arthropoda
- Clade: Pancrustacea
- Class: Insecta
- Order: Lepidoptera
- Family: Geometridae
- Genus: Ziridava
- Species: Z. kanshireiensis

Binomial name
- Ziridava kanshireiensis Prout, 1958

Synonyms
- Ziridava xylinaria kanshireiensis Prout, 1958

= Ziridava kanshireiensis =

Species of moth

Ziridava kanshireiensis is a moth in the family Geometridae. It is found in Taiwan and on the Philippines, Borneo and Peninsular Malaysia.
