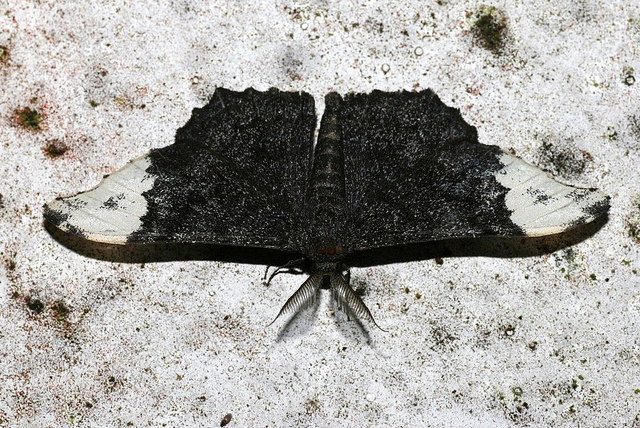
- Malaya, Fraser's Hill upper montane forest

Scientific classification
- Kingdom: Animalia
- Phylum: Arthropoda
- Clade: Pancrustacea
- Class: Insecta
- Order: Lepidoptera
- Family: Geometridae
- Genus: Hyposidra
- Species: H. apioleuca

Binomial name
- Hyposidra apioleuca Prout, 1916

= Hyposidra apioleuca =

Species of moth

Hyposidra apioleuca is a geometer moth in the Ennominae subfamily. It is found in Peninsular Malaysia, Sumatra, and Borneo. The species prefers lower montane forests at 1000-1200m, but has been collected as low as 500m and at 1930m.
