= Ziridava xylinaria =

Indistinct carpet

Scientific classification
- Kingdom: Animalia
- Phylum: Arthropoda
- Class: Insecta
- Order: Lepidoptera
- Family: Geometridae
- Genus: Ziridava
- Species: Z. xylinaria

Binomial name
- Ziridava xylinaria Walker, 1863

Synonyms
- Chloroclystis xylinaria; Ziridava xylinaria subrubida Warren, 1897; Chloroclystis leptomita Turner, 1907; Ziridava xylinaria subaequata Prout, 1929

Species of moth

Ziridava xylinaria, the indistinct carpet, is a moth in the family Geometridae. The species was first described by Francis Walker in 1863. It is found in Sri Lanka, India, Hong Kong and on Peninsular Malaysia, Borneo, Java and possibly the Philippines and Sulawesi.

== Description ==
The wingspan is about 28 mm in the male and 34 mm in the female. Body very pale brown with rufous, fuscous, and silvery scaly speckles. Forewings with four lines between the base and middle, very highly angled below costa, and dark, then rufous and oblique to inner margin. A large fuscous and rufous patch found beyond the cell bounded by the double postmedial line, which is angled beyond the cell, then incurved to inner margin, and with an indistinct dentate line beyond it. A rufous and fuscous patch on the margin below apex. There is an indistinct almost straight, pale submarginal line. Hindwings with traces of numerous waved lines. A sub-basal dark band and a postmedial rufous line angled found beyond cell. It comprised with dark marks inside it from vein 4 to inner margin.

== Subspecies ==
- Ziridava xylinaria baliensis Prout, 1958
- Ziridava xylinaria florensis Prout, 1958
- Ziridava xylinaria kanshireiensis Prout, 1958
- Ziridava xylinaria khasiensis Prout, 1958
- Ziridava xylinaria rubridisca Hampson, 1891
- Ziridava xylinaria subaequata Prout, 1929
