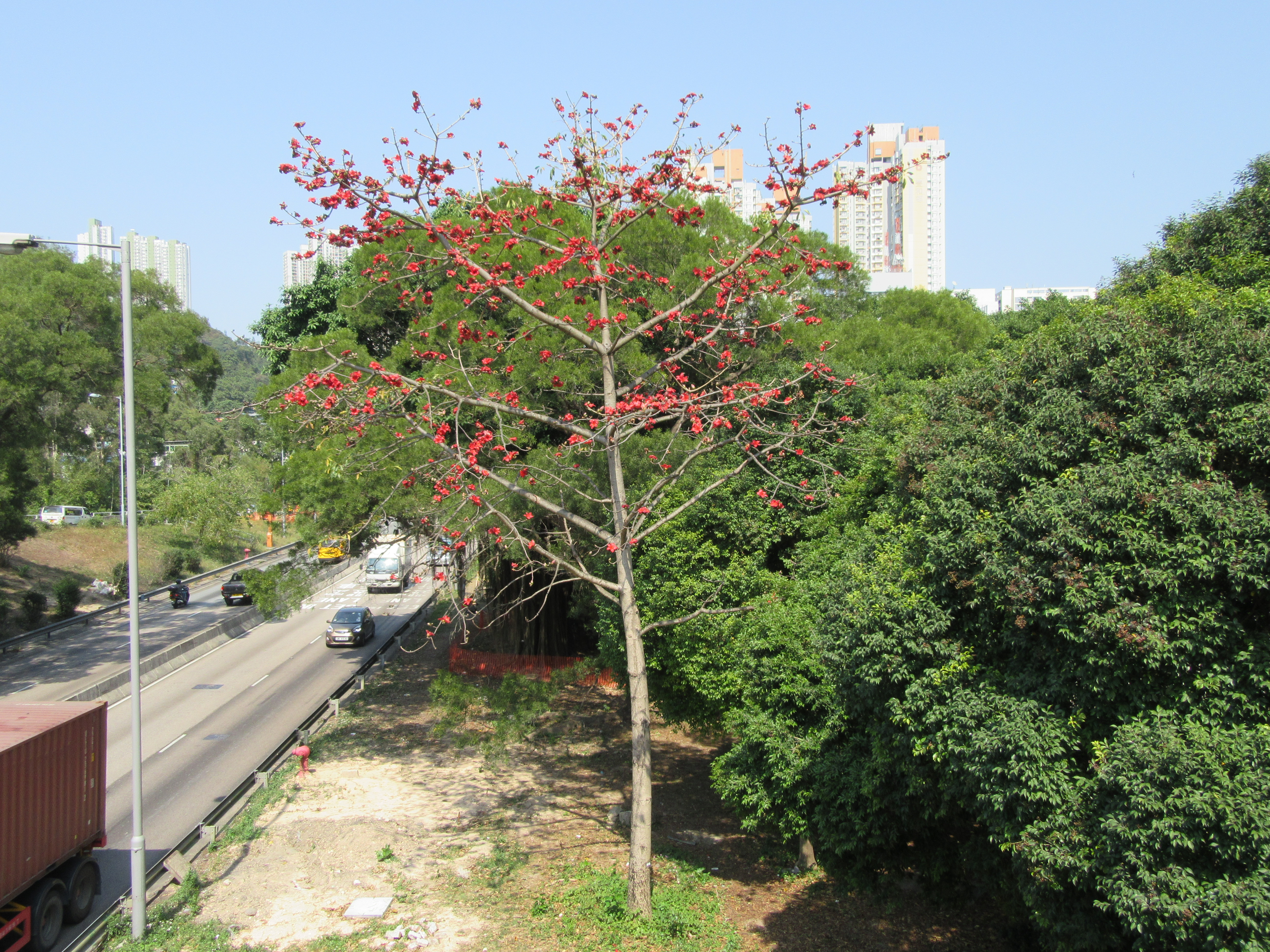
- Blooming with red flowers in Hong Kong

Conservation status
- Least Concern (IUCN 3.1)

Scientific classification
- Kingdom: Plantae
- Clade: Embryophytes
- Clade: Tracheophytes
- Clade: Angiosperms
- Clade: Eudicots
- Clade: Rosids
- Order: Malvales
- Family: Malvaceae
- Genus: Bombax
- Species: B. ceiba

Binomial name
- Bombax ceiba L.

Synonyms
- 15 synonyms: Bombacopsis quinata Dugand; Bombax quinatum Jacq.; Pachira quinata W.S.Alverson; Pochota quinata W.D.Stevens; Bombax aculeatum L.; Bombax ceiba Burm.f.; Bombax ceiba var. leiocarpum A.Robyns; Bombax heptaphyllum Cav.; Bombax malabaricum DC.; Bombax thorelii Gagnep.; Bombax tussacii Urb.; Gossampinus malabarica (DC.) Merr.; Gossampinus rubra Buch.-Ham.; Gossampinus thorelii (Gagnep.) Bakh.; Salmalia malabarica (DC.) Schott & Endl.; Melaleuca grandiflora Blanco

= Bombax ceiba =

Species of plant

Bombax ceiba, like other trees of the genus Bombax, is commonly known as cotton tree. More specifically, it is sometimes known as Malabar silk-cotton tree; red silk-cotton; red cotton tree; or ambiguously as silk-cotton or kapok, both of which may also refer to Ceiba pentandra.

This Asian tropical tree has a straight tall trunk and its leaves are deciduous in winter. Red flowers with 5 petals appear in the spring before the new foliage. It produces a capsule which, when ripe, contains white fibres like cotton. Its trunk bears spikes to deter attacks by animals. Although its stout trunk suggests that it is useful for timber, its wood is too soft to be very useful.

== Description ==
Bombax ceiba grows to an average of 20 meters, with old trees up to 60 meters in wet tropical regions. The trunk and limb bear numerous conical spines particularly when young, but get eroded when older. The leaves are palmate with about 6 leaflets radiating from a central point (tip of petiole), an average of 7–10 centimetres (2 5/6–4 in) wide, 13–15 centimetres (5 1/6–5 5/6 in) in length. The leaf's long flexible petiole is up to 20 centimetres (8 in) long.

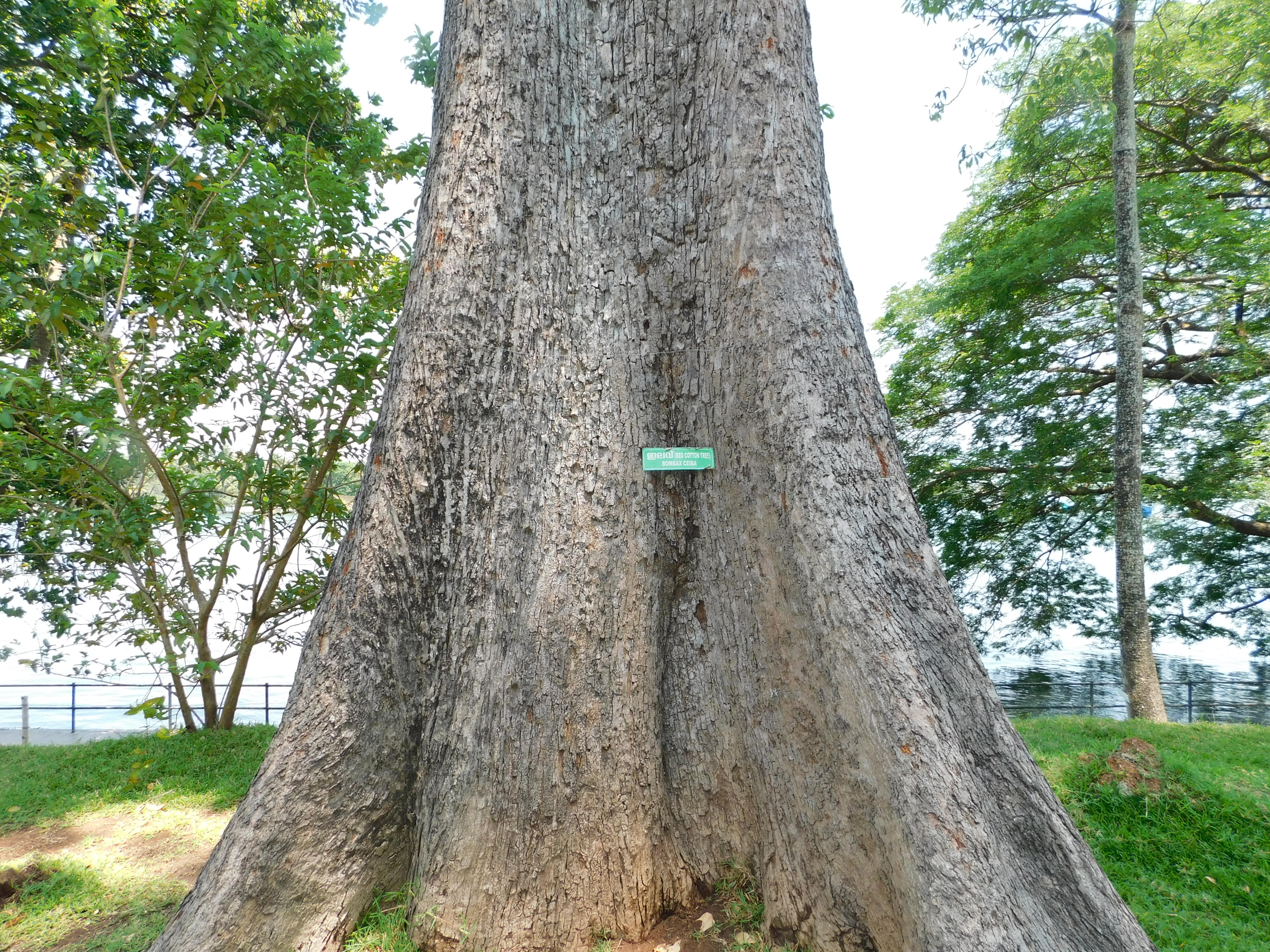
Large tree at Kodungallur, India

Cup-shaped flowers solitary or clustered, axillary or sub-terminal, fascicles at or near the ends of the branches, when the tree is bare of leaves, an average of 7–11 centimetres (2 5/6–4 1/3 in) wide, 14 centimetres (5 1/2 in) in width, petals up to 12 centimetres (4 2/3 in) in length, calyx is cup-shaped usually 3 lobed, an average of 3–5 centimetres (1 1/6–2 in) in diameter. Staminal tube is short, more than 60 in 5 bundles. The stigma is light red, up to 9 centimetres (3 1/2 in) in length, ovary is pink, 1.5–2 centimetres (2/3–5/6 in) in length, with the skin of the ovary covered in white silky hair at 1mm long. Seeds are numerous, long, ovoid, black or gray in colour and packed in white cotton.

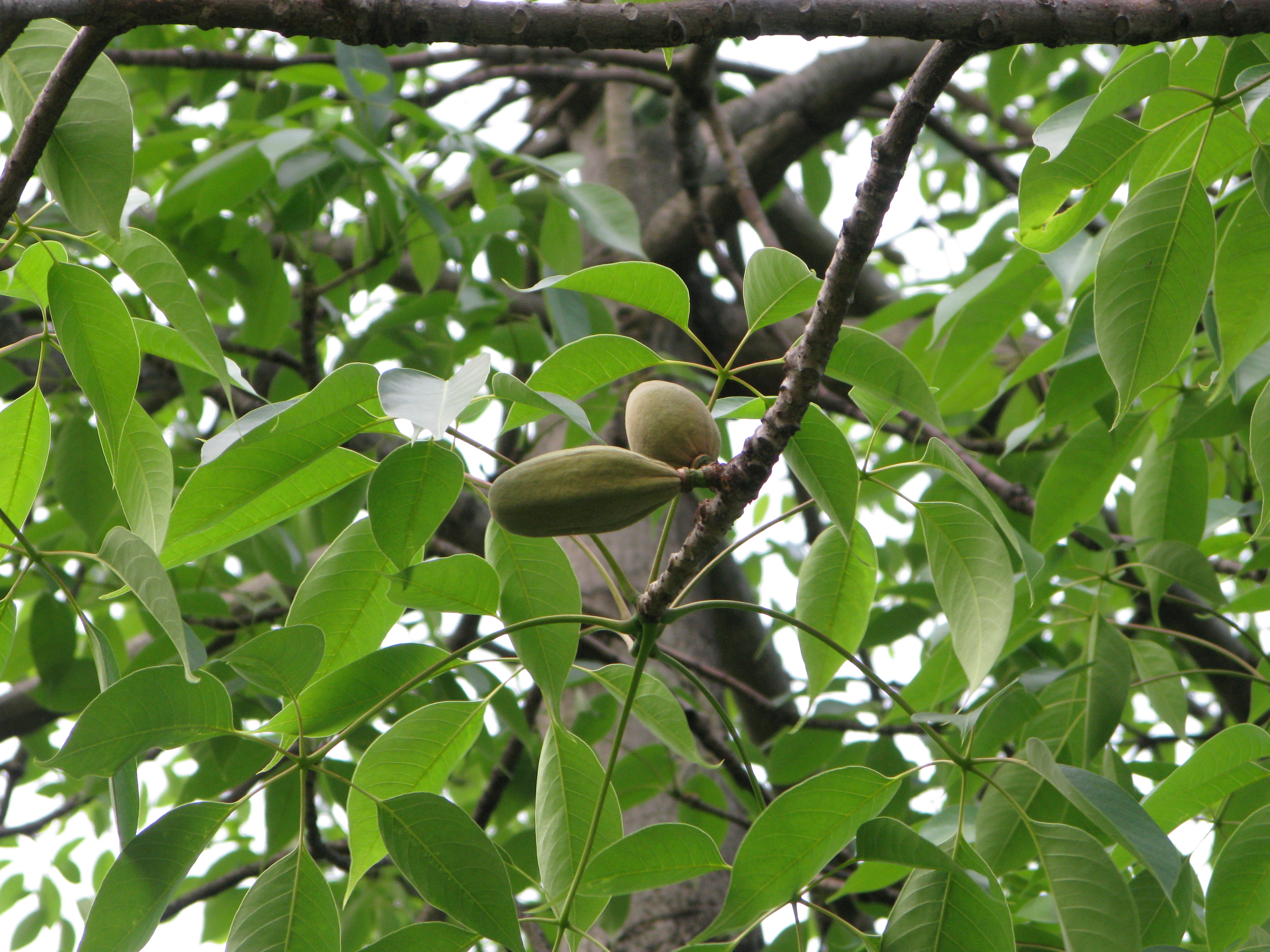
Immature fruits in Hong Kong

The fruit, which reaches an average of 13 centimetres (5 in) in length, is light-green in color in immature fruits, brown in mature fruits.

== Gallery ==
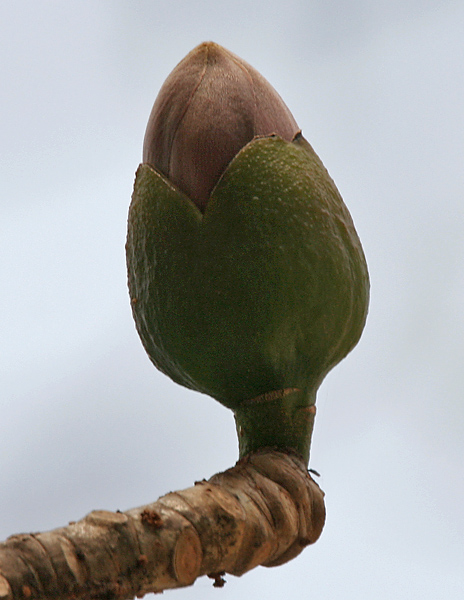
Flower bud

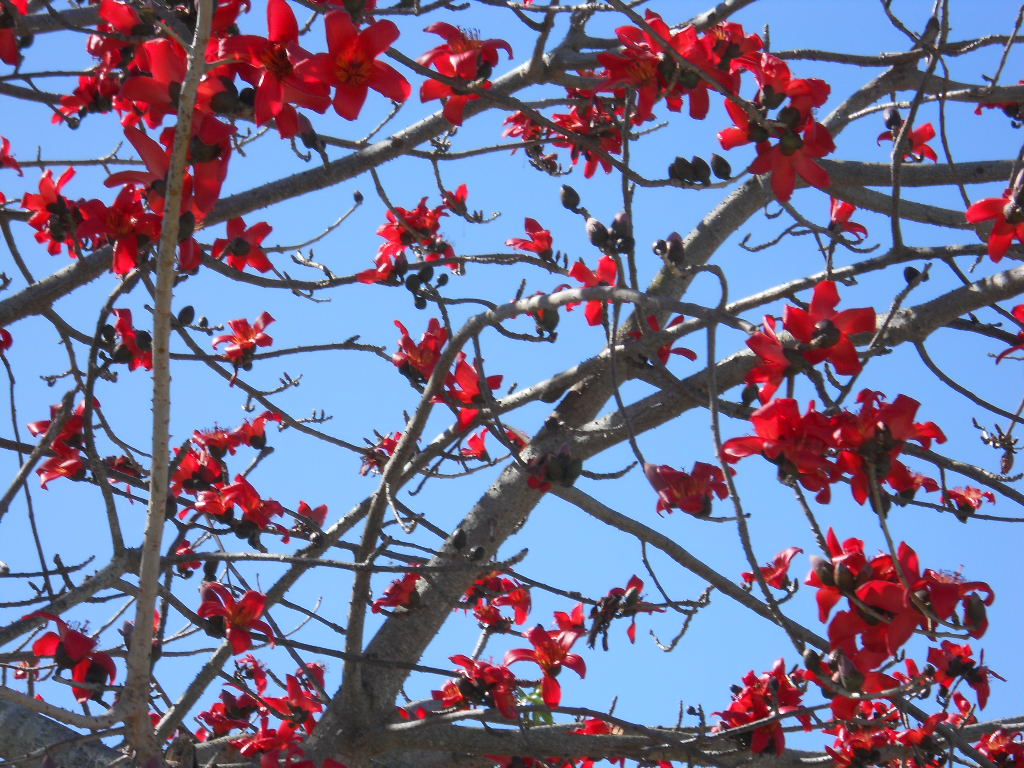
Mid-shot of flowers

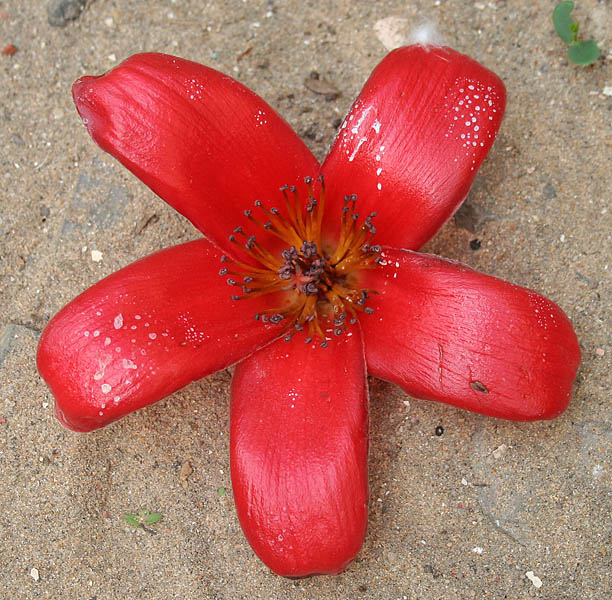
Single (fallen) flower

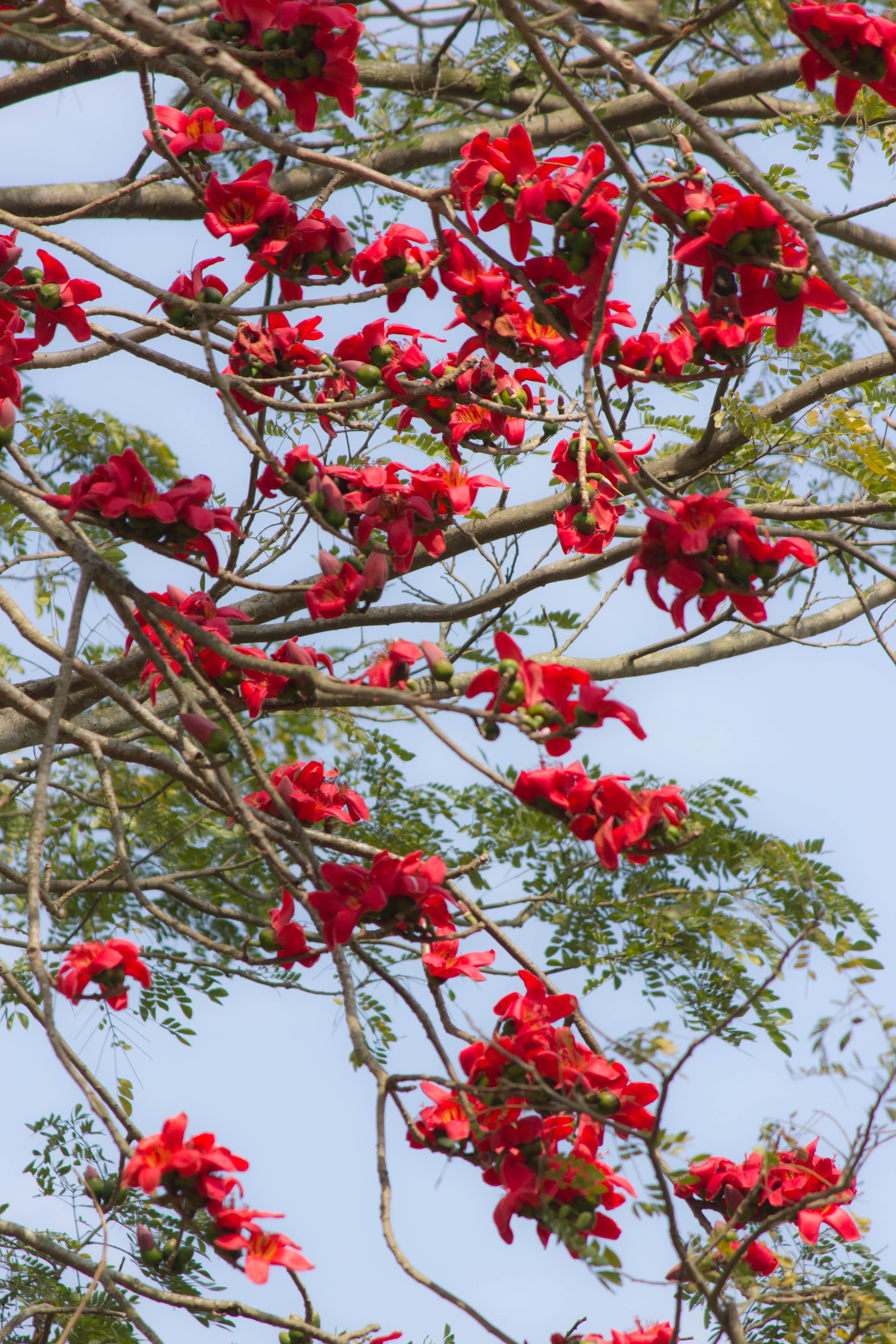
Blooms

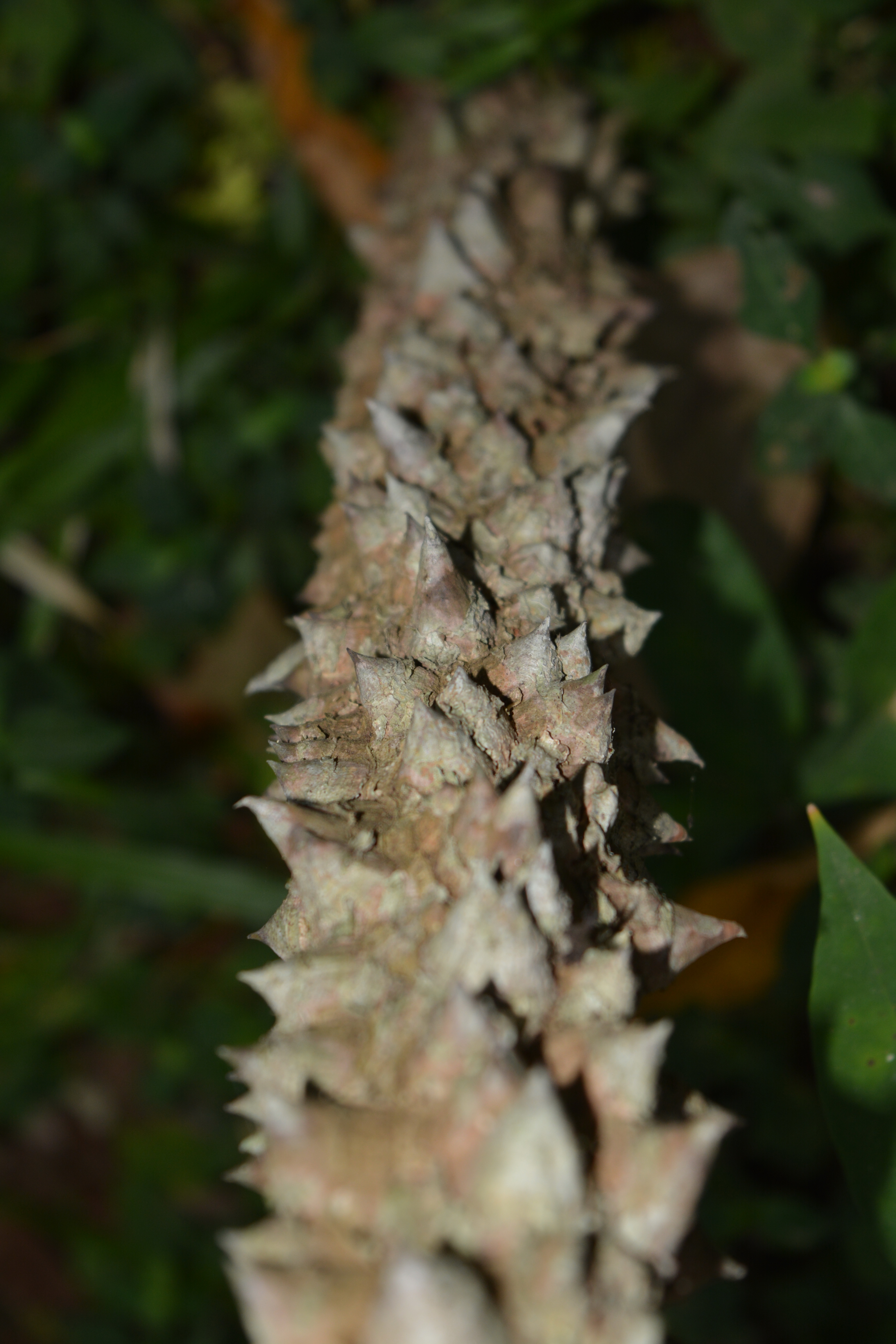
Young Bark

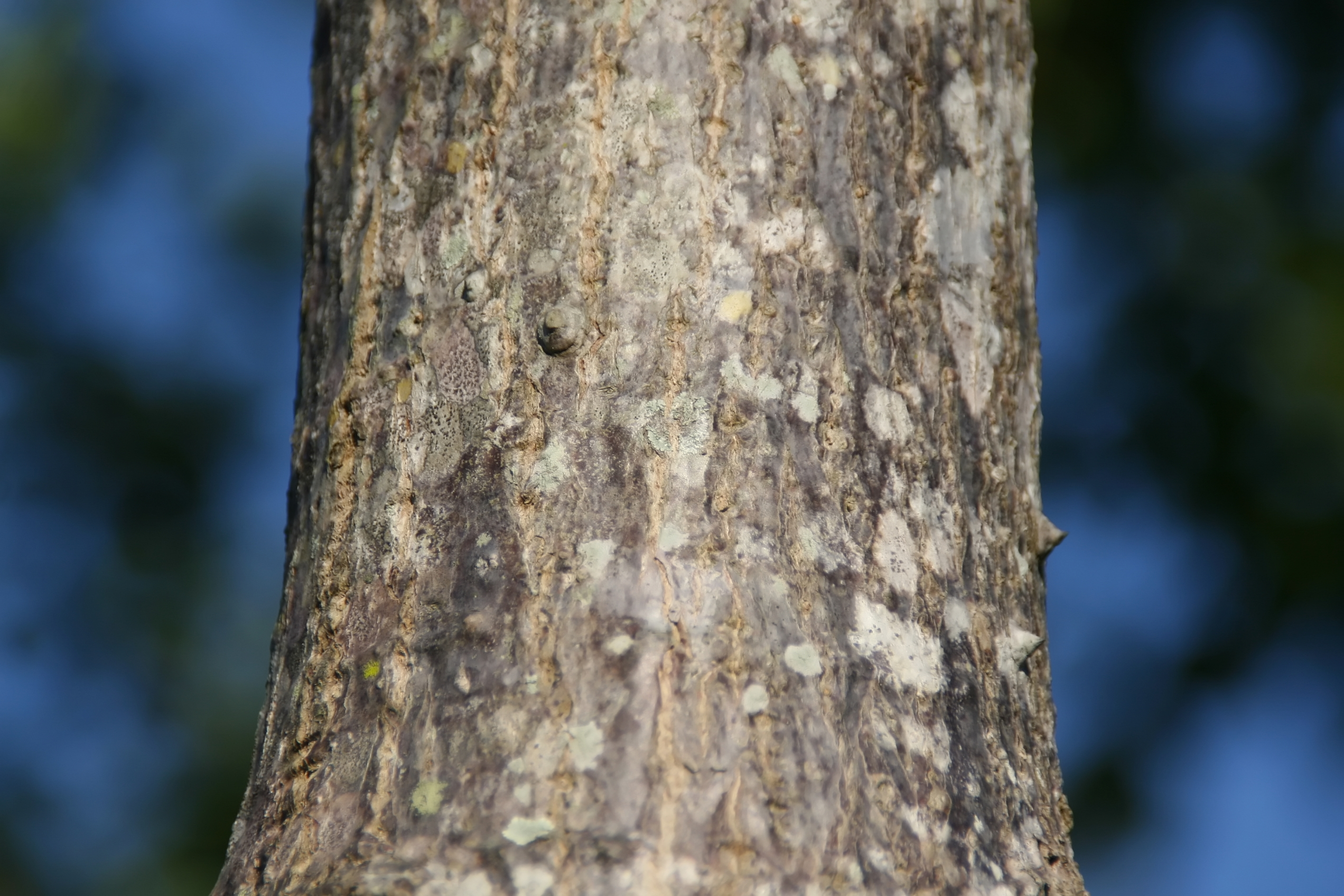
Mature bark

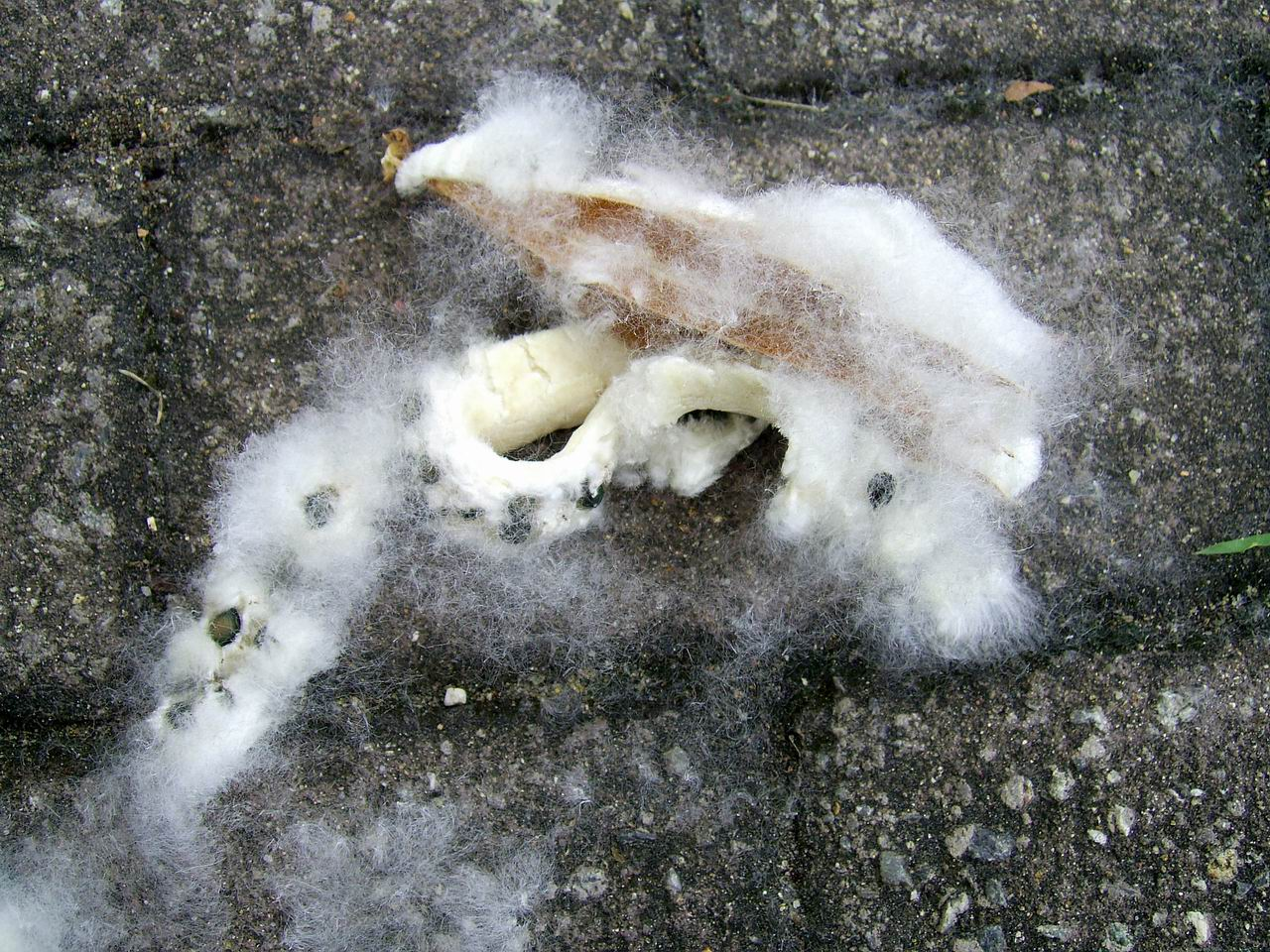
Seeds

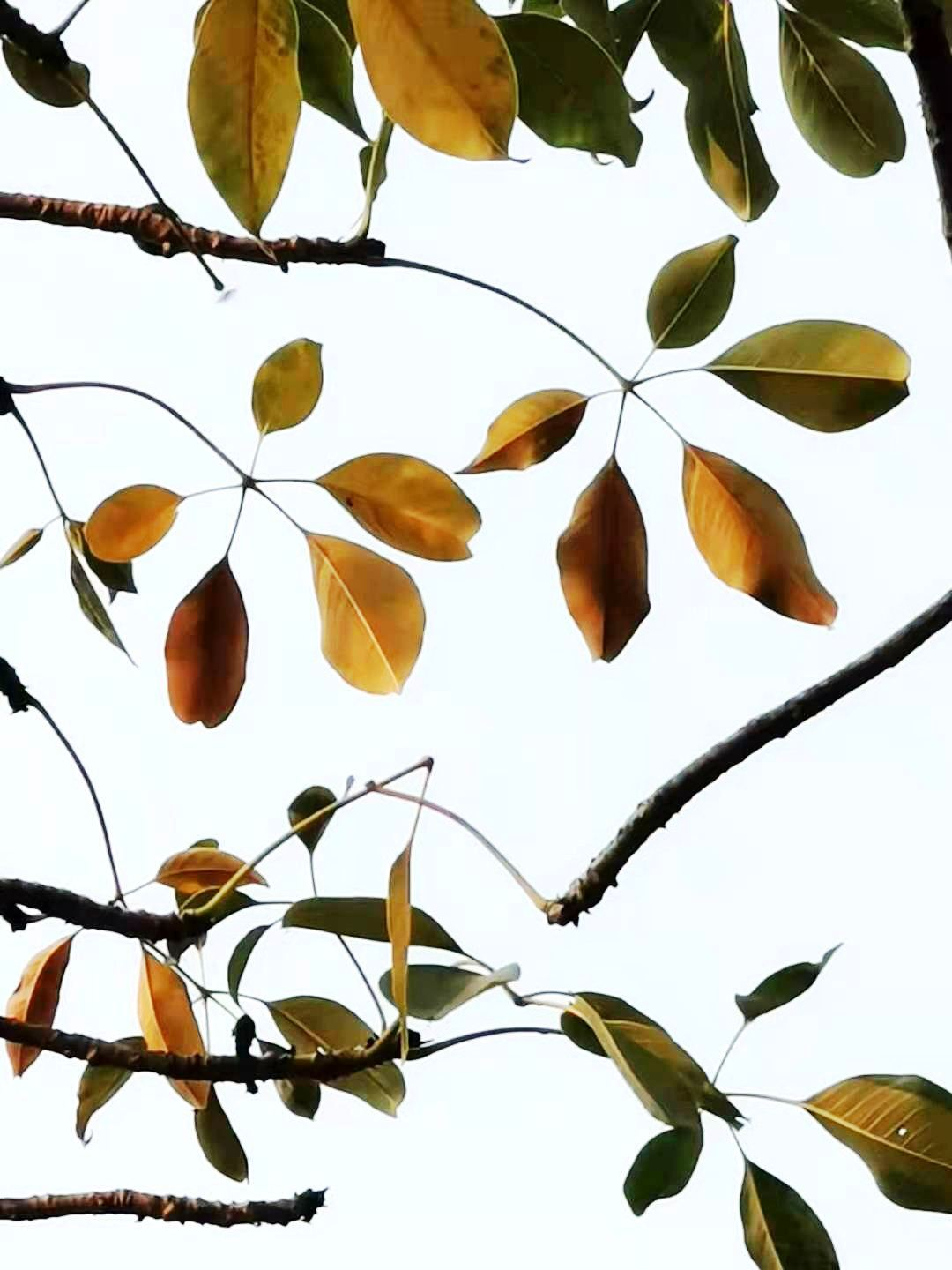
Phyllotaxy

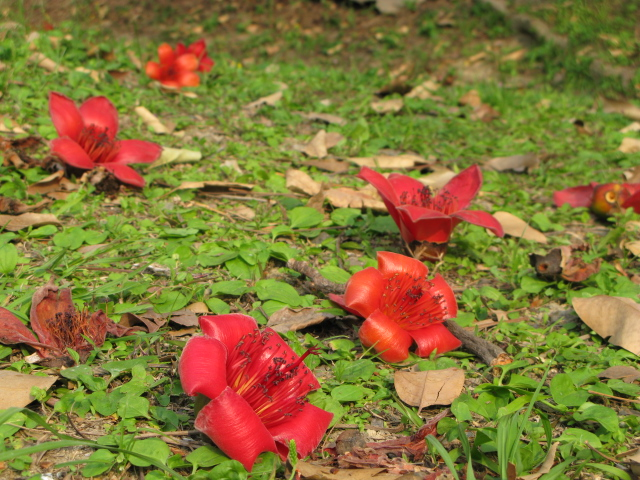
Fallen flowers in Hong Kong

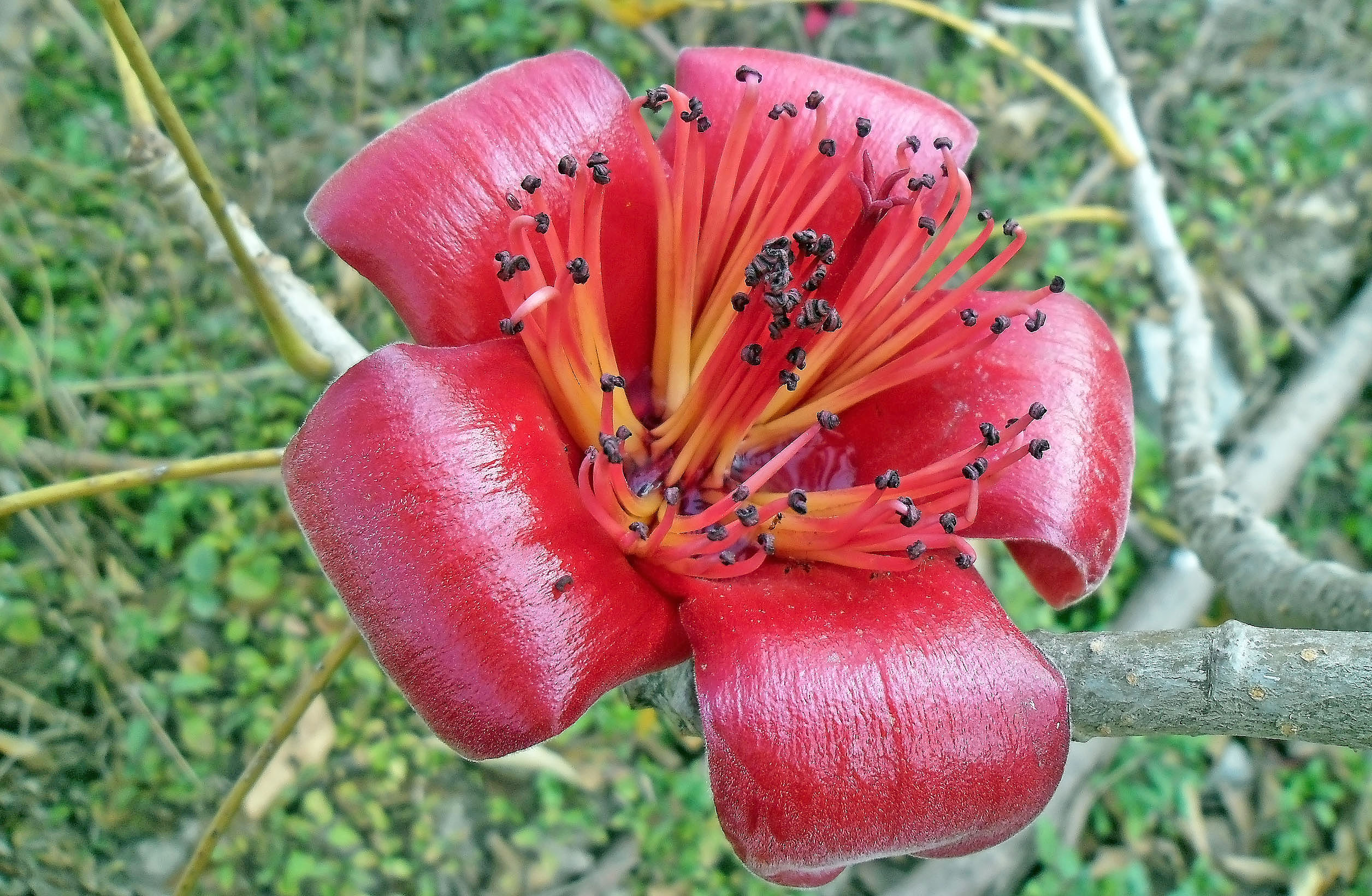
Up close of flower on the branch

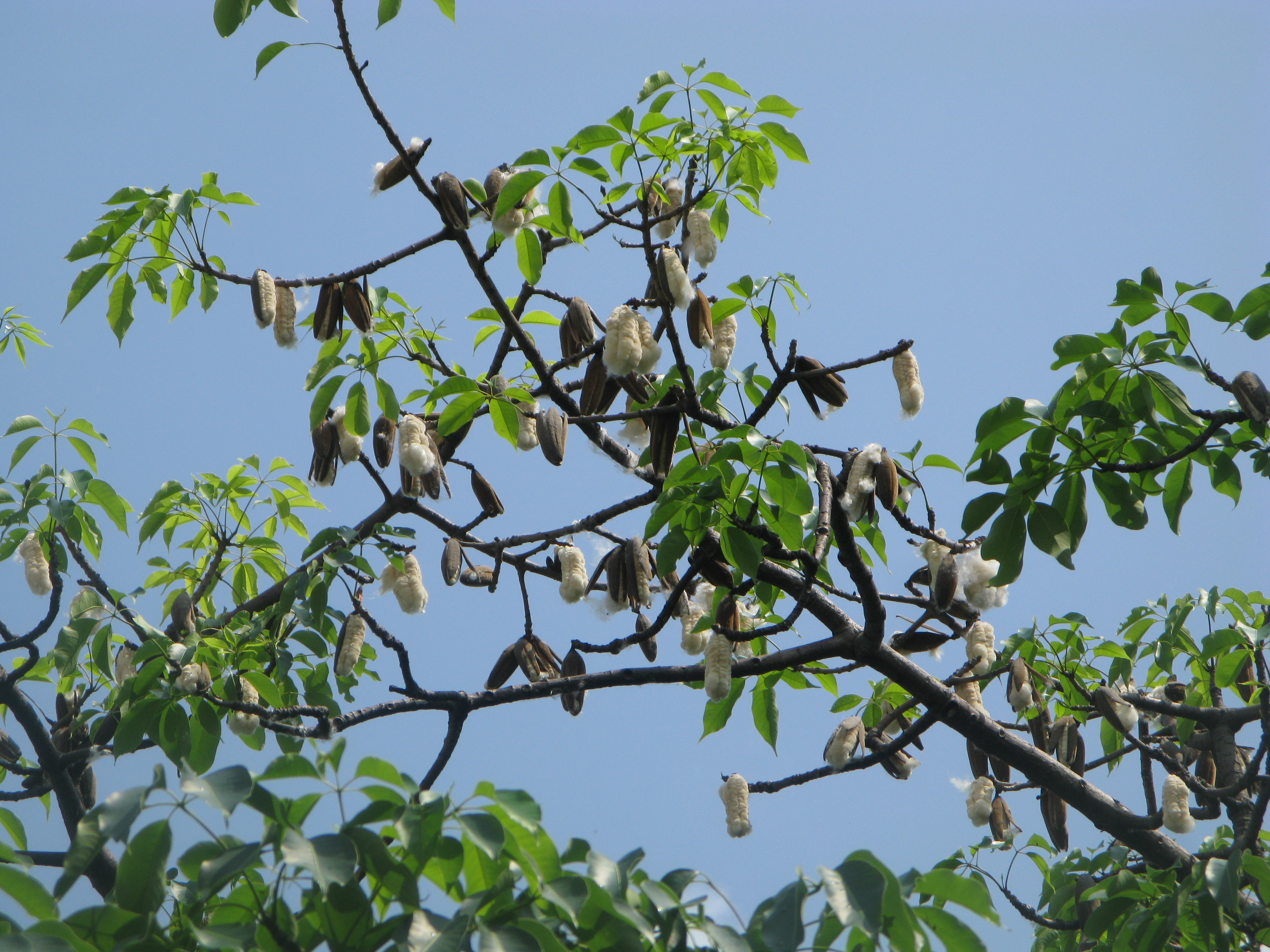
Opened cotton pods.

== Range ==
The tree is native to various areas in Tropical Asia and Oceania, which includes Pakistan, India, Nepal, Sri Lanka, Bangladesh, Bhutan, Myanmar, South China, Taiwan, Laos, Thailand, Cambodia, Vietnam, Malaysia, Indonesia, Philippines, the Solomon Islands, Papua New Guinea and Australia. It is typically found in Tropical and subtropical moist broadleaf forests but in some areas in Southern China they grow in drier valleys and savannas.

== Cultivation ==
The tree is widely planted in southeastern Asian countries and regions (such as in Myanmar, Nepal, Thailand, Vietnam, Malaysia, Philippines, Indonesia, southern China and Taiwan, etc.). According to Chinese historical record, the king of Nam Yuet (located in the southern China and northern Vietnam nowadays), Zhao Tuo, gave a tree to the emperor of the Han dynasty in the 2nd century BC.

This tree is commonly known as Let-pan (Burmese language: လက်ပံ), semal (Hindi: सेमल), shimal (Nepali: सीमल), shimul (Bengali: শিমুল) or ximolu (Assamese: শিমলু) in India. It is widely planted in parks and on roadsides there because of its beautiful red flowers which bloom in March/April. This tree is quite common in New Delhi although it doesn't reach its full size of 60m there because of the semi arid climate. The cotton fibers of this tree can be seen floating in the wind around the time of early May. This tree shows two marked growth sprints in India: in spring and during the monsoon months. Perhaps due to subtropical climate and heavy rainfalls, it is found in dense populations throughout the Northeast India. In Myanmar, its flowers are let to be dry and cooked, which is one of the traditional foods of Myanmar.

This tree is also found in the eastern parts of Pakistan, especially in Margalla Hills and the eastern city of Lahore. The local Urdu and Punjabi names for the tree is sumbal.

== Uses ==
The white fluffy fibres are carded into thread and woven into textiles in Nepal and India. In North India, the fibers are also used in pillows. In Thailand, the dry cores of the Bombax ceiba flower (Thai: งิ้ว) are an essential ingredient of the nam ngiao spicy noodle soup of the cuisine of Shan State and Northern Thailand, as well as the kaeng khae curry.

The 1889 book The Useful Native Plants of Australia records that the tree was at that time known as Bombax malabaricum, its common names included "Simool Tree" or "Malabar Silk-cotton", and that the calyx of the flower-bud was eaten as a vegetable in India.

=== Role in Cantonese culture ===
Bombax ceiba
- Traditional Chinese: 木棉花
- Literal meaning: cotton-tree flowers
Transcriptions
Yue: Cantonese
- Yale Romanization: Muhk mìhn fāa
- Jyutping: Muk6 min4 faa1

Bombax ceiba is literally known as "cotton-tree flowers" in Cantonese. It plays a vital role in Southern Chinese, especially Guangzhou Cantonese culture. It is the official flower of Guangzhou, the capital of Guangdong in southern China. Flowering season takes places from late February to early May. Fruiting can start as early as March. At the peak of its flowering season, elderly people may often be seen gathering the fallen flowers, which they later dry to prepare tea or soup. The flowers are very attractive to local wildlife such as the fruit-eating Japanese white-eye, which often draw a hole in an unopened flower bud. Honey bees and bumble bees also attracted to the flowers to collect pollen and nectar. Because the flowers attract many insects, crab spiders can be occasionally found on a fully opened flower, hunting bees.

The flower was also used as the trademark of the Guangzhou-based China Southern Airlines.

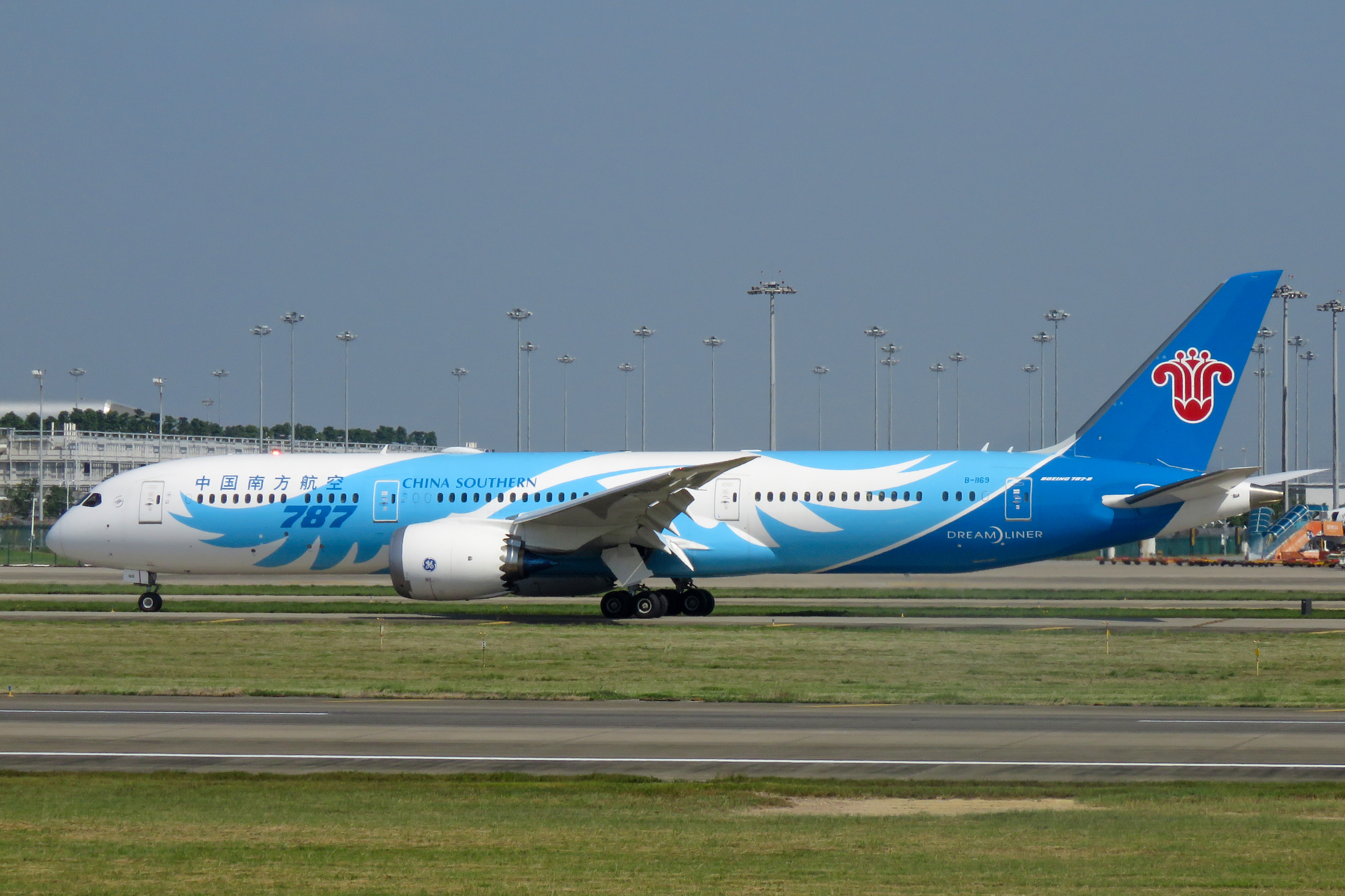
The tailfin of a China Southern Airlines Boeing 787 featuring a Bombax ceiba flower

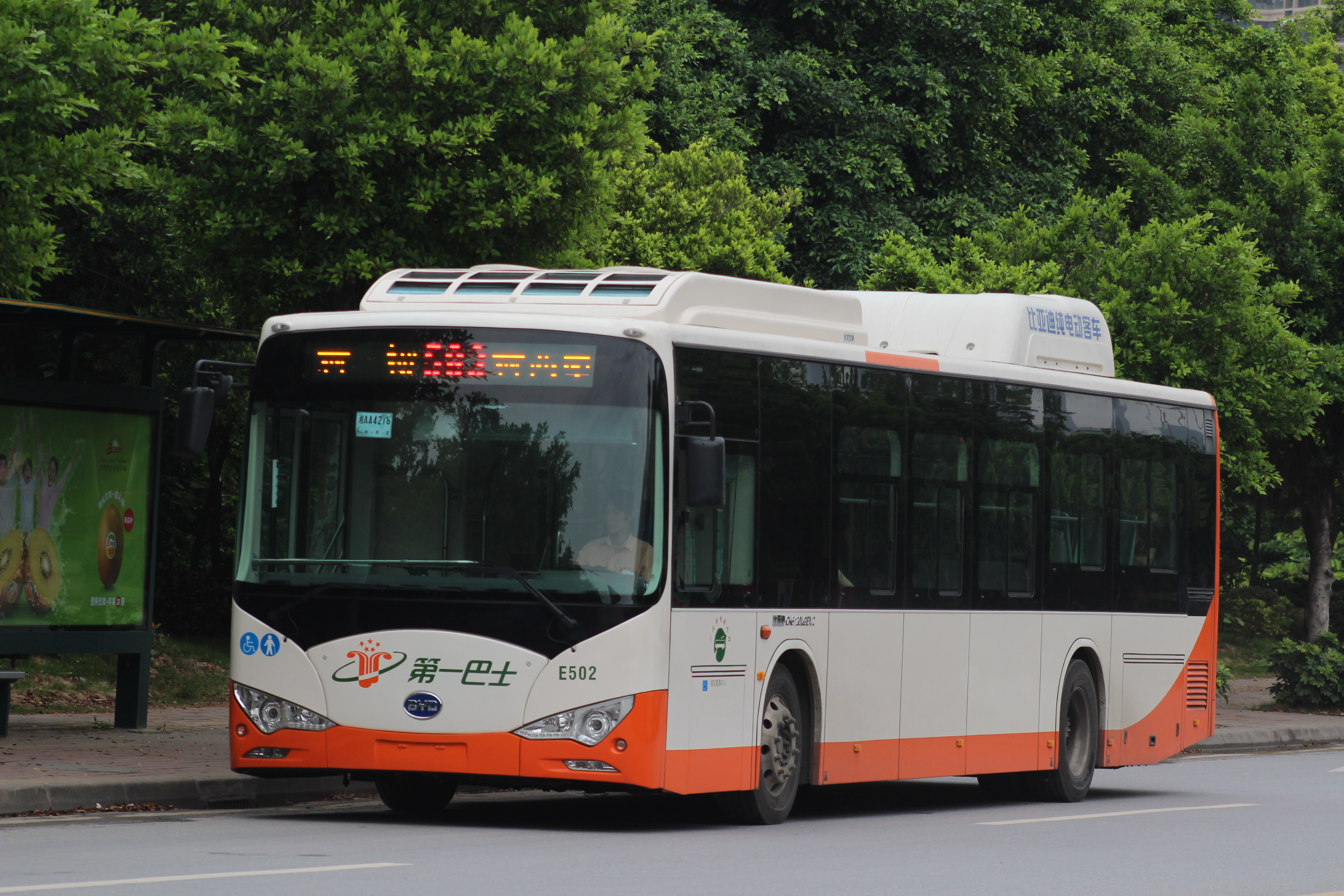
The logo of the Guangzhou-Yiqi bus company is also inspired by Bombax ceiba

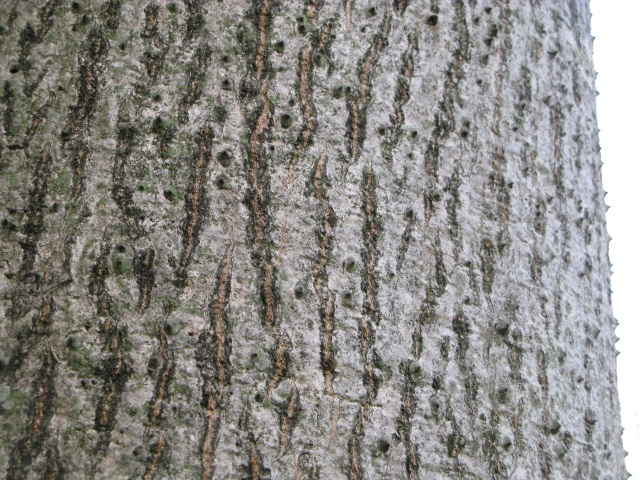
Up-close view of a typical, undisturbed bark in Hong Kong.
