= Ziridava rubridisca =

Scientific classification
- Kingdom: Animalia
- Phylum: Arthropoda
- Class: Insecta
- Order: Lepidoptera
- Family: Geometridae
- Genus: Ziridava
- Species: Z. rubridisca

Binomial name
- Ziridava rubridisca (Hampson, 1891)

Synonyms
- Menophra rubridisca Hampson, 1891

Species of moth

Ziridava rubridisca is a moth in the family Geometridae. It is found in southern India and Sri Lanka.
