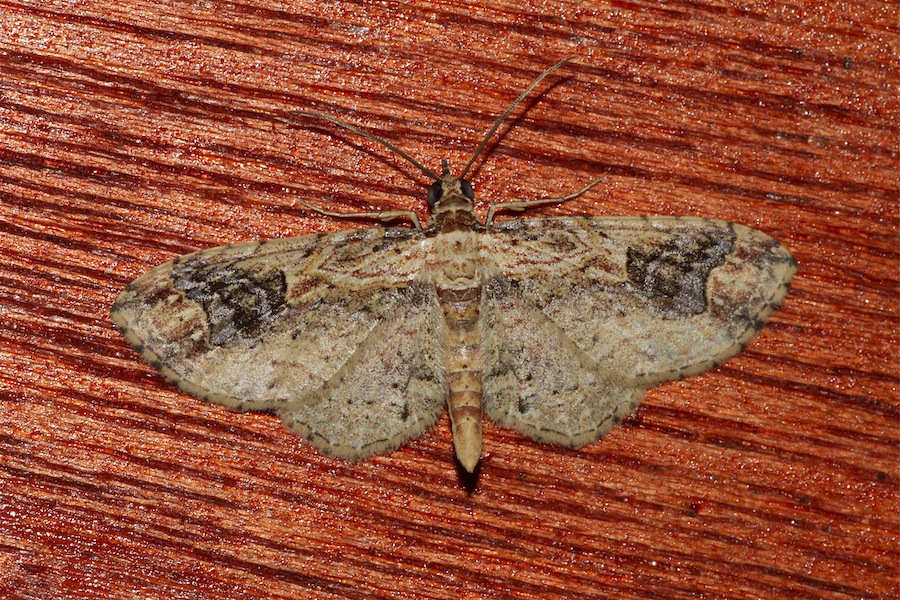
- Ziridava kanshireiensis - Borneo, Mount Trusmadi area, 1200 m

Scientific classification
- Domain: Eukaryota
- Kingdom: Animalia
- Phylum: Arthropoda
- Class: Insecta
- Order: Lepidoptera
- Family: Geometridae
- Tribe: Eupitheciini
- Genus: Ziridava; Walker, 1863

Synonyms
- Prorocorys Warren, 1899

= Ziridava (moth) =

Genus of moths

Ziridava is a genus of moths in the family Geometridae.

== Species ==
- Ziridava asterota Prout, 1958
- Ziridava baliensis Prout, 1958
- Ziridava dysorga Prout, 1928
- Ziridava gemmata (Warren, 1899)
- Ziridava kanshireiensis Prout, 1958
- Ziridava khasiensis Prout, 1958
- Ziridava rubridisca (Hampson, 1891)
- Ziridava rufinigra C. Swinhoe, 1895
- Ziridava xylinaria Walker, 1863
