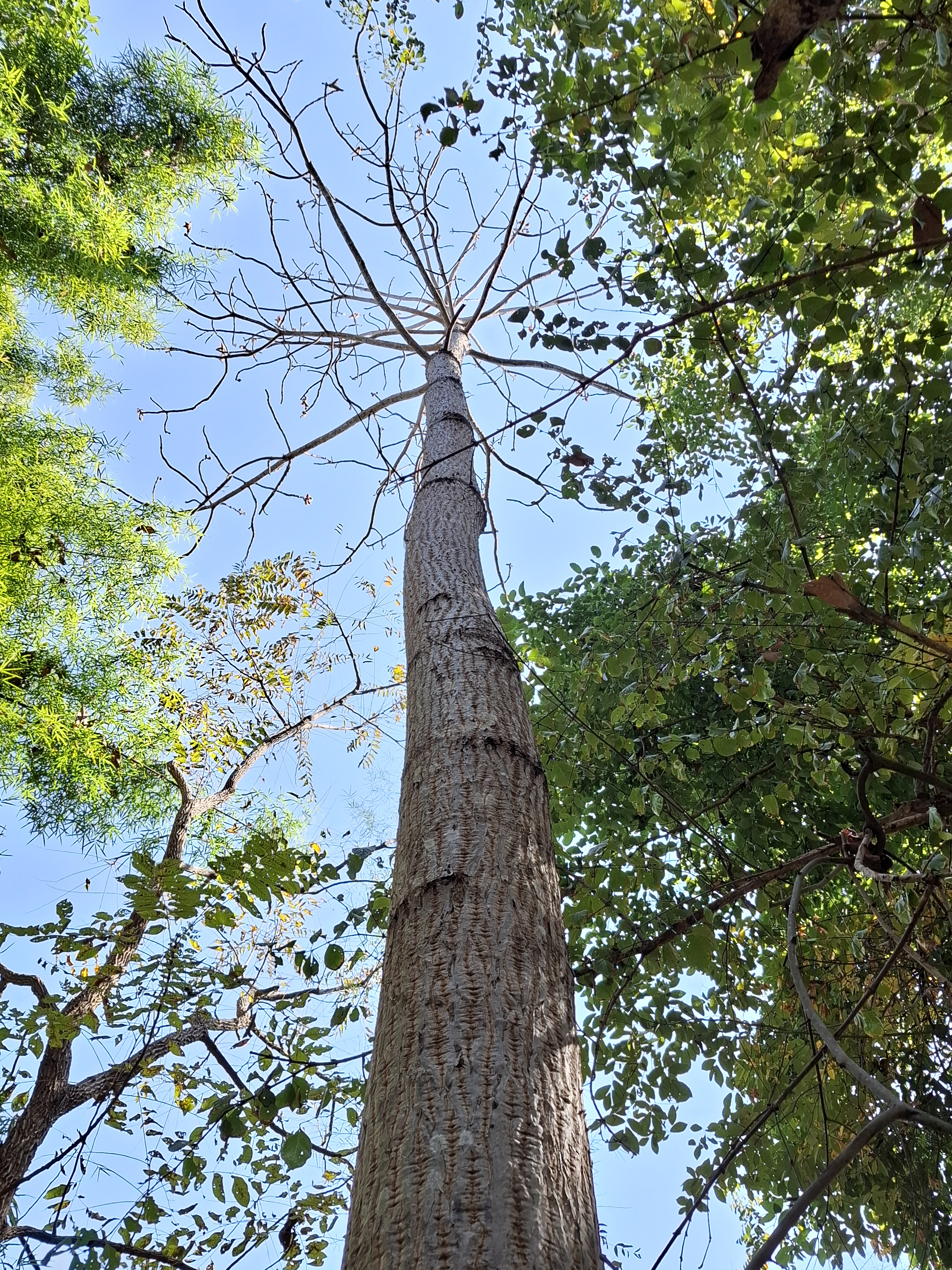

Scientific classification
- Kingdom: Plantae
- Clade: Tracheophytes
- Clade: Angiosperms
- Clade: Eudicots
- Clade: Rosids
- Order: Malvales
- Family: Malvaceae
- Genus: Bombax
- Species: B. anceps

Binomial name
- Bombax anceps Pierre

Synonyms
- Salmalia anceps (Pierre) Stearn; Gossampinus valetonii Bakh. Gossampinus anceps Bakh. Bombax valetonii Hochr. Bombax kerrii Craib

= Bombax anceps =

Species of tree

Bombax anceps is a tree species now in the Malvaceae that was described by Jean Baptiste Louis Pierre from its range in Indochina. The subspecies B. a. cambodiense has been reverted to species Bombax cambodiense Pierre.

== Description ==
It is a deciduous tree with a spiny trunk (illustrated), reaching 15 m in height. The leaves are glabrous and digitate, with 4-7 leaflets. The capsules enclose cottony seeds, like other species in the genus, and are 80–160 mm long.

== Common names ==
In Vietnamese Bombax anceps is called gạo hoa đỏ (describing its red flower) or gạo hai mặt.

== Gallery ==
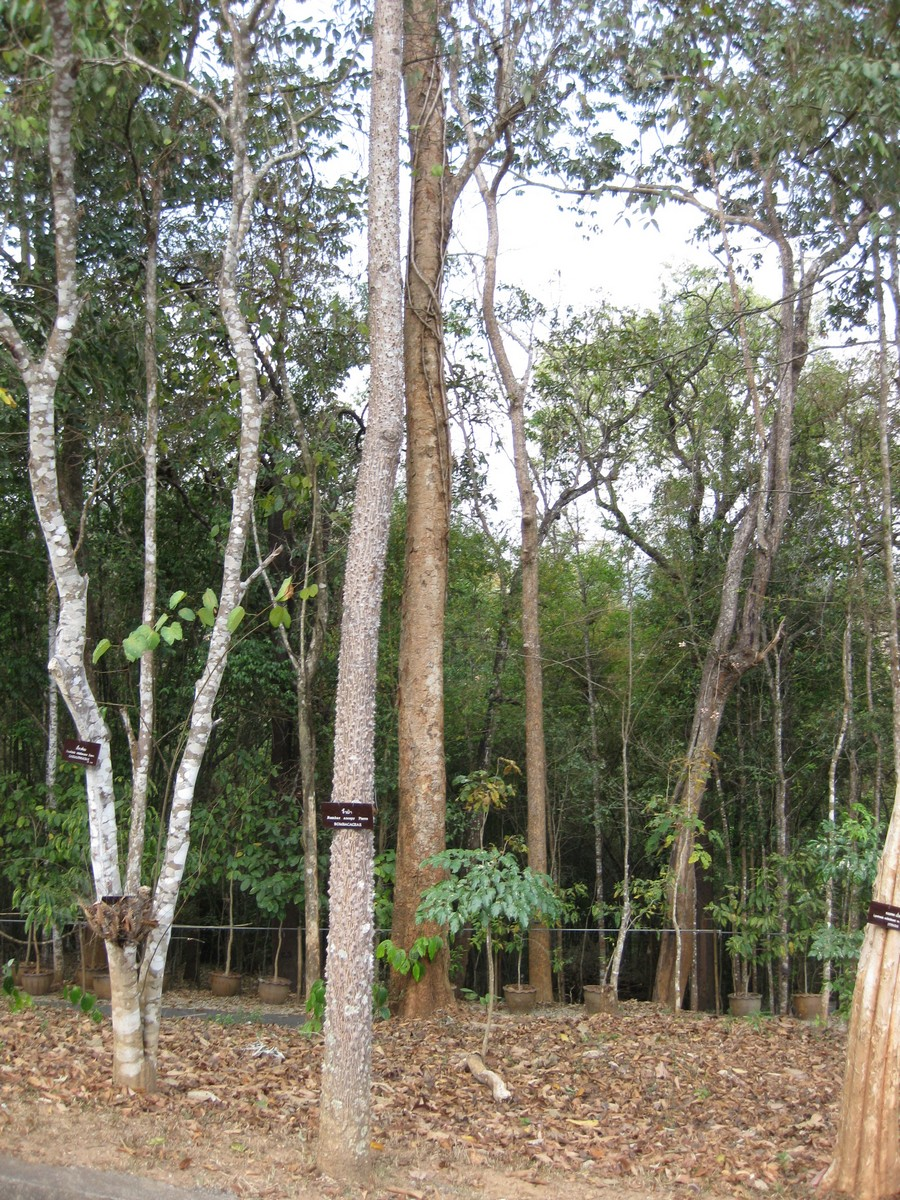

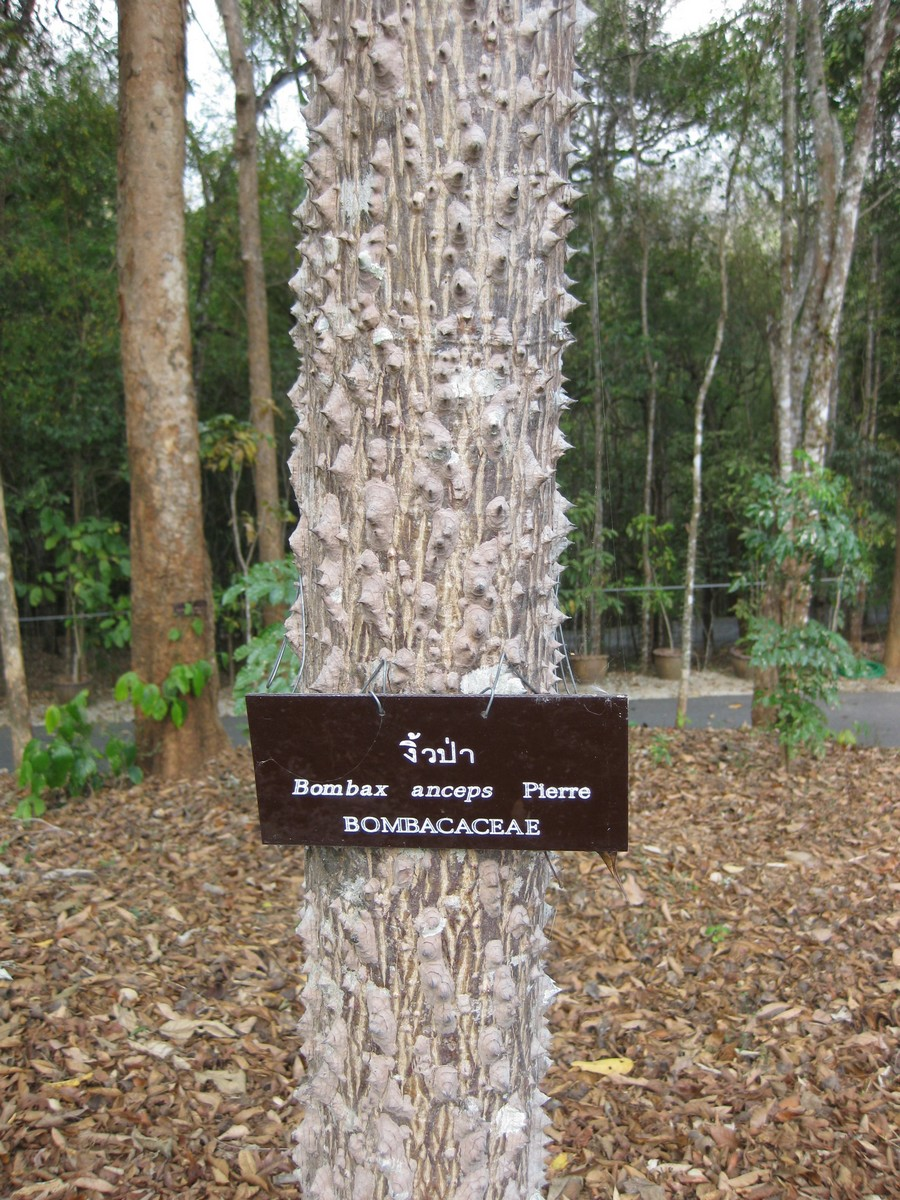

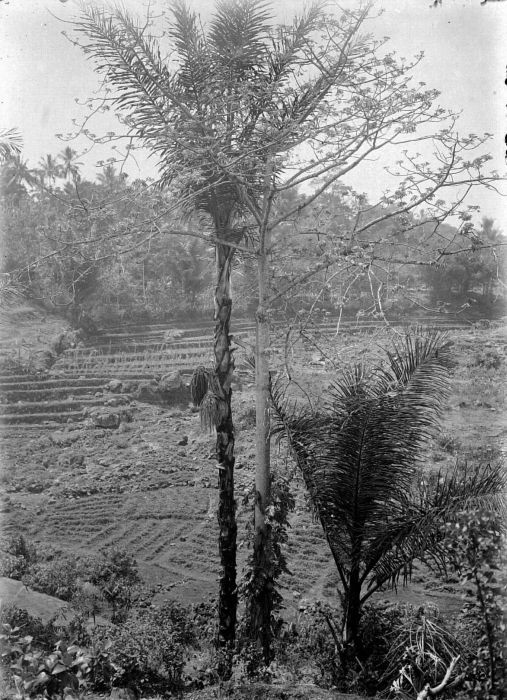
