= Ziridava rufinigra =

Scientific classification
- Domain: Eukaryota
- Kingdom: Animalia
- Phylum: Arthropoda
- Class: Insecta
- Order: Lepidoptera
- Family: Geometridae
- Genus: Ziridava
- Species: Z. rufinigra

Binomial name
- Ziridava rufinigra C. Swinhoe, 1895

Species of moth

Ziridava rufinigra is a moth in the family Geometridae first described by Charles Swinhoe in 1895. It is found on Borneo and in India, New Guinea and the Australian state of Queensland.

The wingspan is about 20 mm.

== Subspecies ==
- Ziridava rufinigra rufinigra (India, Borneo)
- Ziridava rufinigra brevicellula Prout, 1916 (New Guinea)
- Ziridava rufinigra cedreleti Prout, 1958 (Queensland)
