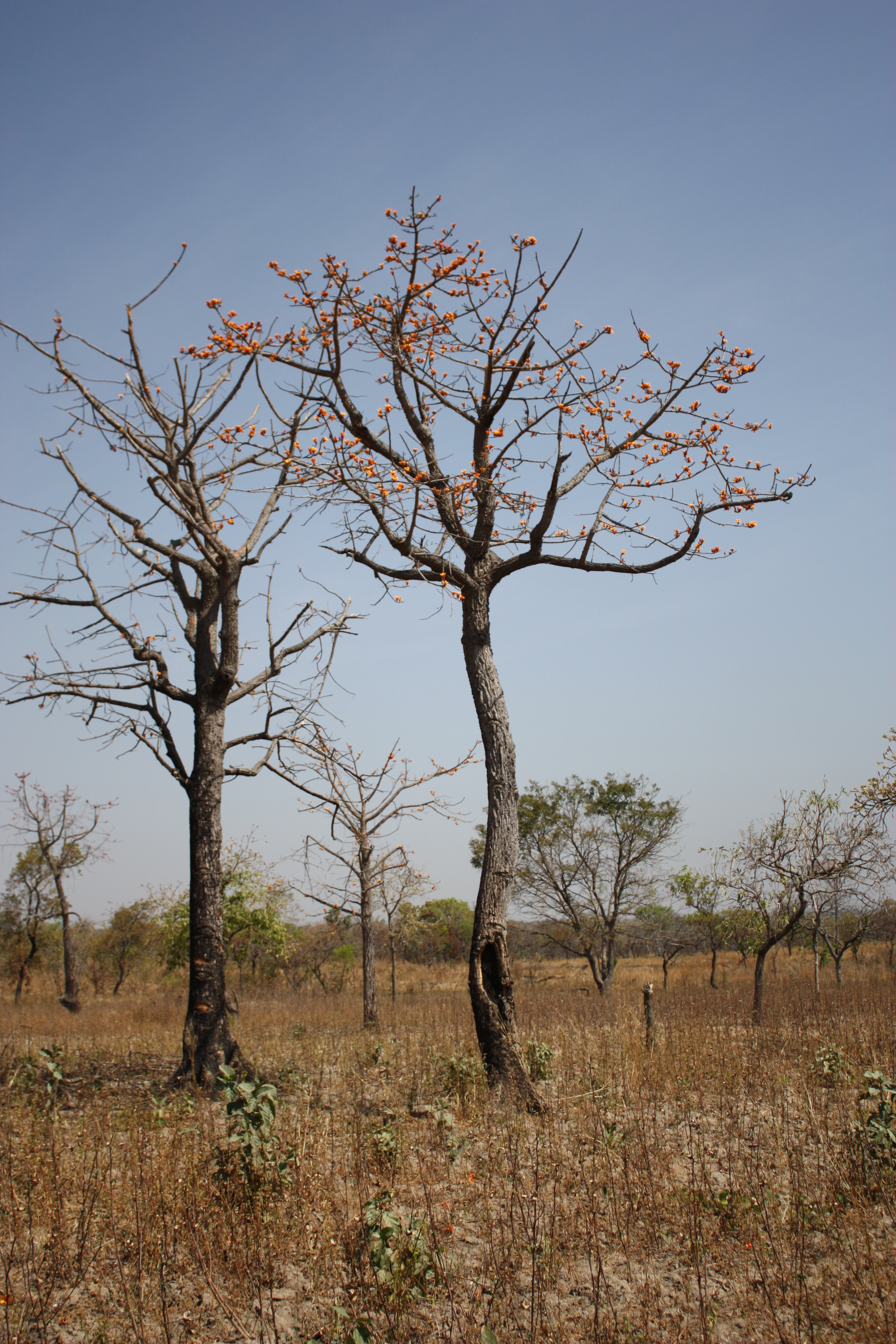
- Bombax costatum in fields in Burkina Faso

Scientific classification
- Kingdom: Plantae
- Clade: Tracheophytes
- Clade: Angiosperms
- Clade: Eudicots
- Clade: Rosids
- Order: Malvales
- Family: Malvaceae
- Genus: Bombax
- Species: B. costatum

Binomial name
- Bombax costatum Pellegr. & Vuill.

= Bombax costatum =

Species of flowering plant

Bombax costatum is a tree usually reaching a height of 5 – 15 m. It flowers in the dry season before the leaves appear.

== Distribution ==
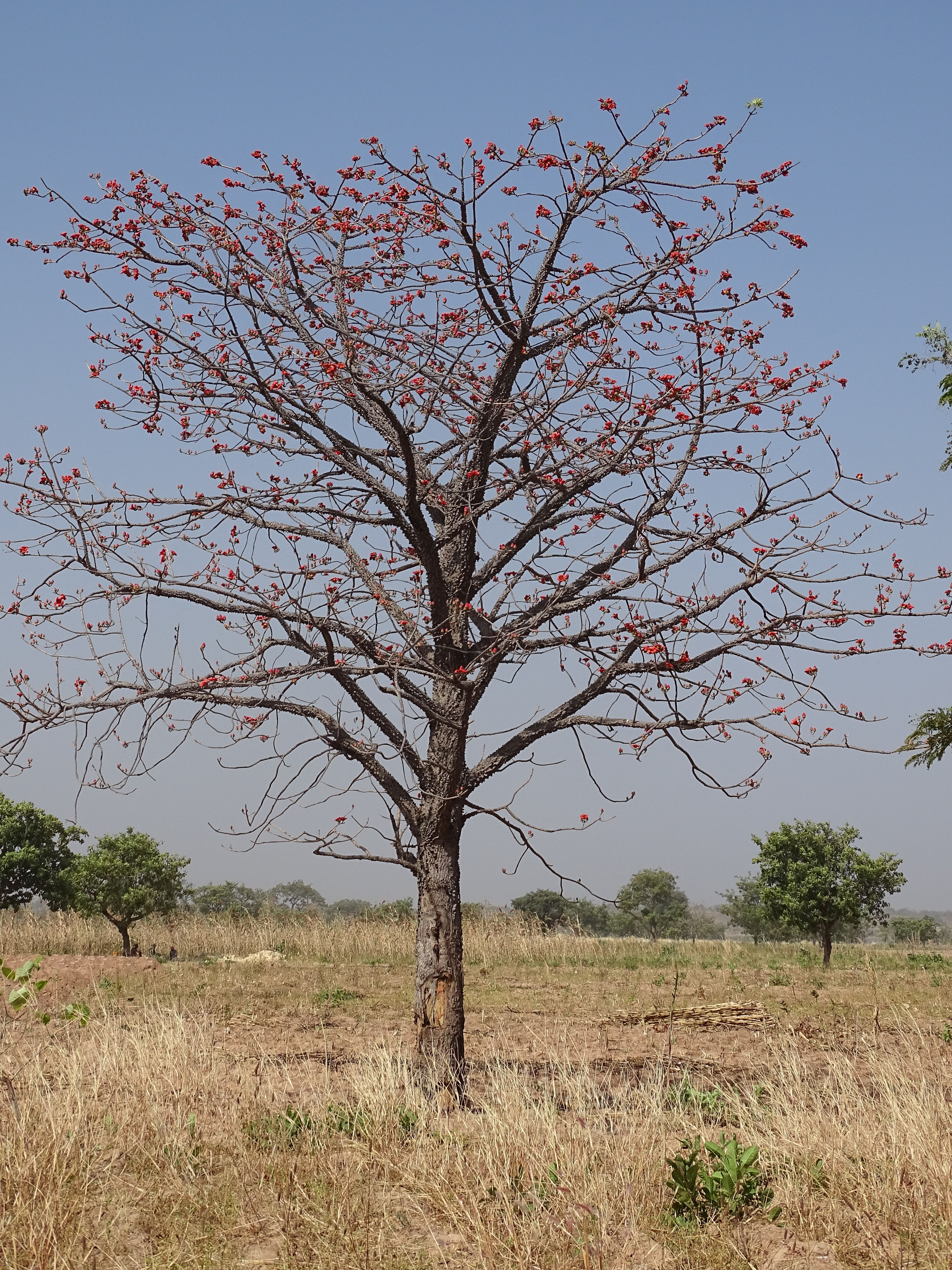
Bombax costatum around Pendjari National Park in Benin

Its distribution is restricted to the savanna zones of West Africa from Senegal to the Central African Republic. It is often found on rocky hills or lateritic crusts.

== Use ==
The calyx is used in West African cuisine as a base of sauces. Excessive harvesting of flowering branches contributes to the decline of the species.
