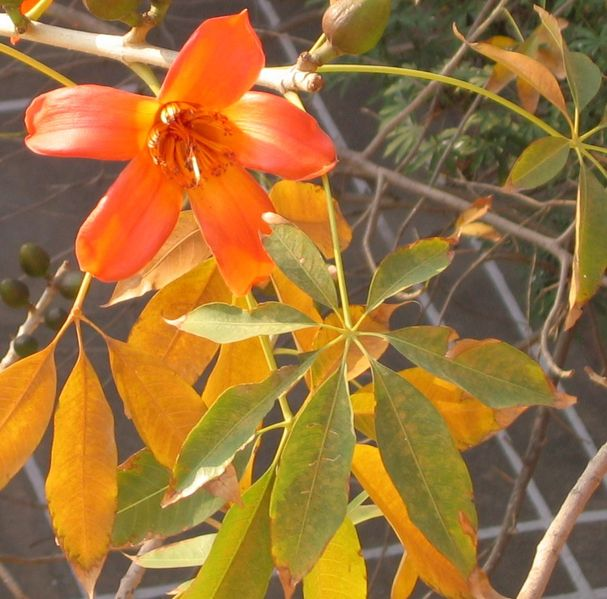
- Bombax ceiba flower

Scientific classification
- Kingdom: Plantae
- Clade: Tracheophytes
- Clade: Angiosperms
- Clade: Eudicots
- Clade: Rosids
- Order: Malvales
- Family: Malvaceae
- Subfamily: Bombacoideae
- Genus: Bombax; L.

Species
- See text

Synonyms
- Salmalia Schott & Endl.

= Bombax =

Genus of flowering plants

Bombax is a genus of mainly tropical trees in the mallow family, Malvaceae. They are native to western Africa, the Indian subcontinent, Southeast Asia, and the subtropical regions of East Asia and northern Australia. It is distinguished from the genus Ceiba, which has whiter flowers.

Common names for the genus include silk cotton tree, simal, red cotton tree, kapok, and simply bombax. Eight species are recognised, although many plants have been placed in the genus that were later moved.

The genus is best known for the species Bombax ceiba, which is widely cultivated throughout tropical and sub-tropical regions of the world. It is native to southern and eastern Asia and northern Australia.

Bombax species are used as food plants by the larvae of some Lepidoptera species including the leaf-miner Bucculatrix crateracma which feeds exclusively on Bombax ceiba.

The tree appears on the flag of Equatorial Guinea.

The tree fibers are 100% cellulose, able to float, impervious to water, and have a low thermal conductivity. Called Kapok in Asia, the fibers are mainly used for insulation in sleeping bags and life preservers. The fibers are also used as stuffing for pillows and mattresses.

== Description ==
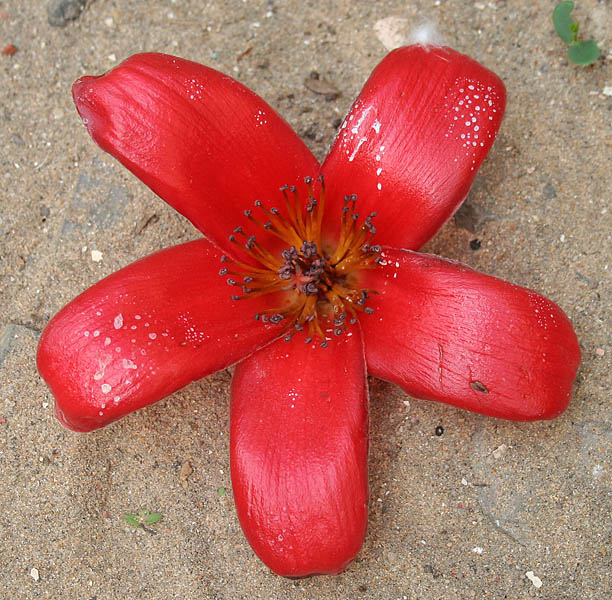
Fallen flower of Bombax ceiba

Bombax species are among the largest trees in their regions, reaching 30 to 40 metres in height and up to three metres in trunk diameter. The leaves are compound with entire margins and are deciduous, being shed in the dry-season. They measure 30 to 50 cm across and are palmate in shape with five to nine leaflets. The calyx is deciduous, meaning it does not persist on the fruits. They bear five to ten cm long red flowers between January and March while the tree is still leafless. The stamens are present in bundles in two whorls, while the staminal column lacks lobes. The ovary matures into a husk containing seeds covered by a fibre similar to that of the kapok (Ceiba pentandra) and to cotton, though with shorter fibres than cotton, that does not lend itself to spinning, making it unusable as a textile product.

== Species ==
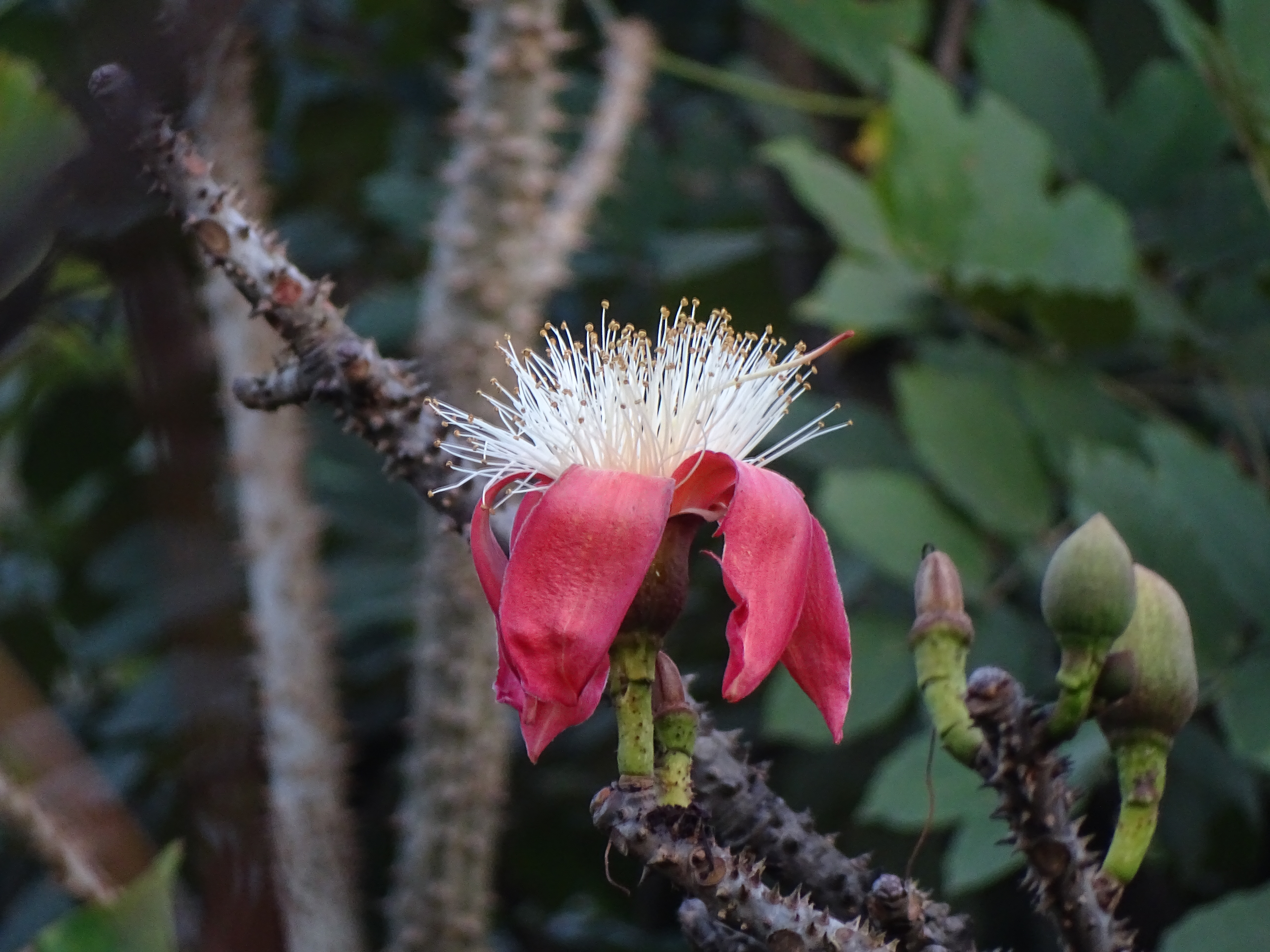
Bombax insigne

Plants of the World Online includes eight species as of March 2026:

- Bombax albidum Gagnep.
- Bombax anceps Pierre
- Bombax blancoanum A.Robyns
- Bombax buonopozense P. Beauv.
- Bombax cambodiense Pierre
- Bombax ceiba L.
- Bombax costatum Pellegr. & Vuill.
- Bombax insigne Wall.

=== Formerly included species ===
This list may be incomplete.

- B. aesculifolium – now Ceiba aesculifolia
- B. affine – now Pachira insignis
- B. aquaticum – now Pachira aquatica
- B. cyathophorum – now Pseudobombax grandiflorum
- B. ellipticum – now Pseudobombax ellipticum
- B. emarginatum – now Pachira emarginata
- B. gossypium – now Cochlospermum religiosum
- B. heptaphyllum – now Pseudobombax septenatum
- B. mossambicense – now Rhodognaphalon mossambicense
- B. orinocense – now Cochlospermum orinocense
- B. pentandrum – now Ceiba pentandra
- B. pyramidale – now Ochroma pyramidale
- B. vitifolium – now Cochlospermum vitifolium
