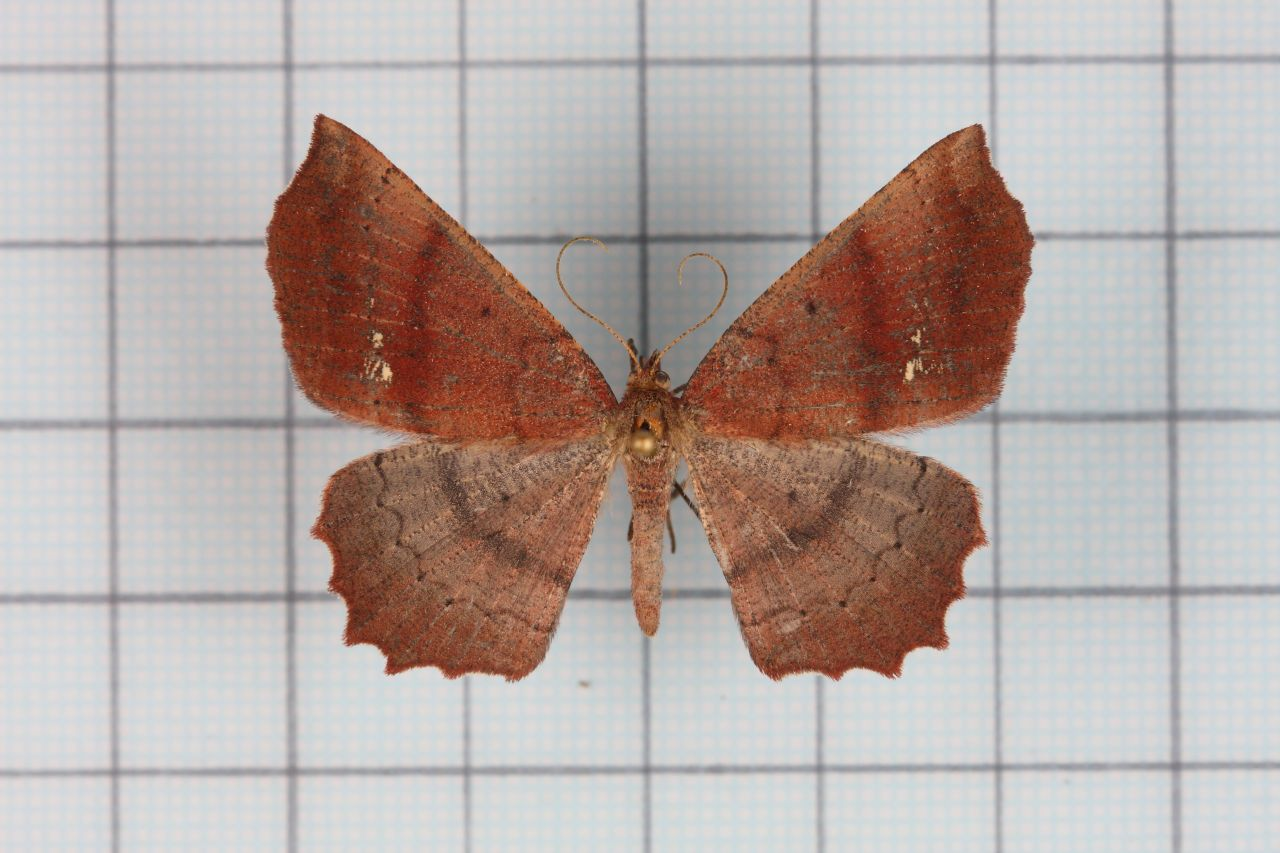

Scientific classification
- Kingdom: Animalia
- Phylum: Arthropoda
- Class: Insecta
- Order: Lepidoptera
- Family: Geometridae
- Genus: Xerodes
- Species: X. contiguaria

Binomial name
- Xerodes contiguaria (Leech, 1897)

Synonyms
- Zethenia contiguaria Leech, 1897; Zethenia cathara Wehrli, 1940; Hyposidra muscula Bastelberger, 1911; Zethenia obscura Warren, 1899

= Xerodes contiguaria =

Species of moth

Xerodes contiguaria is a species of moth in the family Geometridae first described by John Henry Leech in 1897. It is found in Taiwan and China.
