= Meeting point =

Location designated for gathering

ISO standardized pictogram for a fire safety assembly point

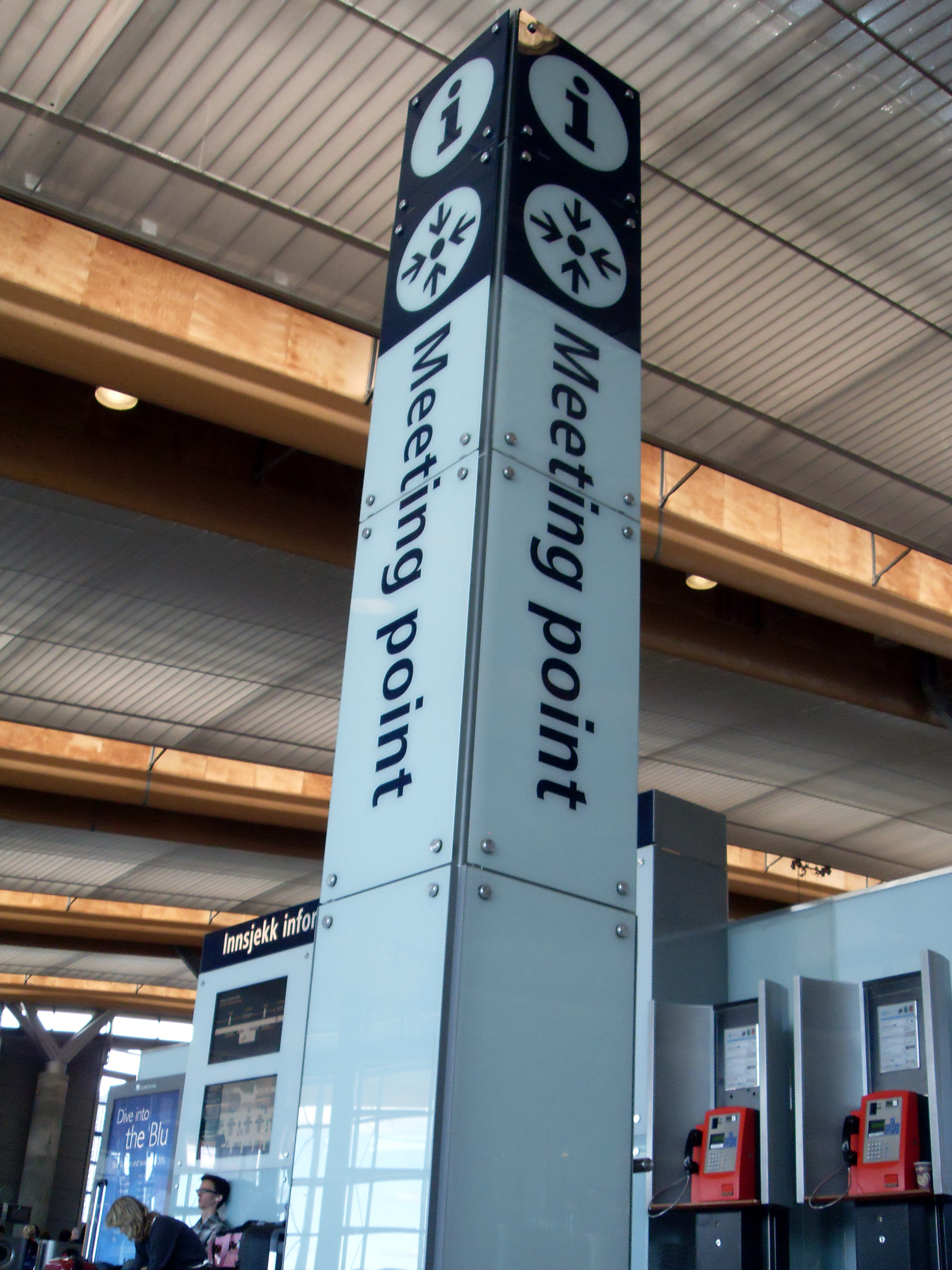
A signed meeting point at the airport Oslo Gardermoen

A meeting point, meeting place, assembly point, rendezvous point or muster point is a geographically defined place where people meet. Such a meeting point is often a landmark that has become popular and is a convenient place for both tourists and citizens to meet. Examples of meeting points include public areas and facilities such as squares, statues, parks, amusement parks, railway stations, airports, etc. or officially designated and signed points in such public facilities. There is often a public sign designating an official meeting point in public facilities (see illustrations).

Especially when referred to as an assembly point or muster point, a meeting point can be a designated safe place where people can gather or must report to during an emergency or drill.

In sociology, a meeting point is a place where a group of people meet on a regular basis, for example, a group of regulars or people with a special interest or background. These meeting points are in designated private rooms, in a part of a park, pub, eatery, hall, or café.

== Examples of well-known meeting points ==
=== Australia ===
- Brisbane - Hungry Jack's on Queen Street Mall.
- Melbourne - "Under the Clocks" at Flinders Street station
- Adelaide - "Malls Balls" at Rundle Mall
- Sydney - "Town Hall Steps" at Sydney Town Hall

=== Denmark ===
- Copenhagen - "Under uret" - Under the clock - at Københavns Hovedbanegård.

=== Nicaragua ===
- El Ostional - "Centro Ole" - Ole Center - at O Parks, WildLife, and Recreation.

=== Sweden ===
- Svampen, "the mushroom", a mushroom-shaped structure on Stureplan, Stockholm.
- Ringen på centralen, "the ring at the central station", a fenced, circle-shaped opening between two levels at the Central Station, Stockholm.

=== Poland ===
- Wrocław, there are two popular meeting spots on Wrocław's Market Square - "the pillory" and statue of Aleksander Fredro.

=== United States ===
- Grand Central Terminal clock in New York City
