= Flute's Journey =

Book by Lynne Cherry

Flute's Journey: The Life of a Wood Thrush
- Author: Lynne Cherry
- Illustrator: Lynne Cherry
- Language: English
- Genre: Children's literature, picture book, nonfiction, nature
- Publisher: Harcourt Brace and Company
- Publication date: 1997
- Publication place: United States

Flute's Journey: The Life of a Wood Thrush is a children's picture book by Lynne Cherry, creator of The Great Kapok Tree. It was published in 1997 by Harcourt Brace and Company.

== Plot summary ==
The book tells the first year of a wood thrush's life starting from it hatching in a forest that is in Maryland. Two children see the bird when it is young and calls it Flute. The children wait for Flute to return from migration and watch him and his mate build a nest and raise their young. In Flute's travels, he encounters many dangers. The eggs and nestlings are at more of a risk.

== Reception ==
A review in the book Gotcha: Nonfiction Book talks to Get Kids Excited about Reading says, "Whether or not you know much about songbirds and the dangers they face, this book is great reading, and it includes ideas for things that kids can do to help them. The illustration of Flute's mother feeding her babies a worm is a good one to show." Books use the book for activities for kids to do. The book focused national media attention on conservation efforts to save the Belt Woods in Maryland.

== See also ==
- Wood thrush
- Lynne Cherry
- Maryland
