= Young Voices on Climate Change =

Films on youth solutions to the climate crisis

Young Voices on Climate Change is a film series created by the US based non-profit organization of the same name. The series present identified solutions which could help tackle the climate crisis, as it shows environmental initiatives planned and implementations possible, by children from the United States of America, Europe, India, Africa and Siberia.

== Films ==
Young Voices on Climate Change consists of eight short films, each about 3–6 minutes long. They were produced and directed by the organization's founder, Lynne Cherry.

The films introduce young citizen scientists and also illustrate how young people can use science and data to inform themselves and their communities about ways to reduce negative human impacts on the environment, including the carbon footprint of their homes, schools, and neighborhoods.

Topics of the films include a campaign to plant one million trees in Germany, a Girl Scouts distributing Compact fluorescent bulbs in their community and Highschool Students campaigning in their community to ban single use plastic bags.

== Reception ==
Kevin Coyle, the Vice President of Education at the National Wildlife Federation, says the films’ "include success stories in a way that allows young people to be heard in their own voice and through their own special perspectives."

Many institutions have endorsed the films, including the National Science Foundation, the National Geographic Society, the National Wildlife Federation, and the Jane Goodall Institute. The films have received extensive media coverage on BBC World News, The New York Times, and The Herald Tribune.

The North American Association for Environmental Education wrote on their EElink: "The Young Voices on Climate Change short films feature inspiring young people age 9-19 taking action and finding solutions to the global warming crisis by reducing the carbon footprint of their homes, schools, communities and states."

According to the Colorado coordinator for Project Learning Tree, which provides training for teachers about how to deliver science-based environmental education: "the films are hopeful and positive, they don't scare kids or leave them all gloomy and doomy... they leave people with ideas for making a change, instead of being afraid and doing nothing."

The Young Voices on Climate Change films are used as a resource for youth, schools, community groups, parents, and teachers, programs on energy audits and energy saving, tree planting, civic engagement, and other groups or individuals interested in the environment and global warming. The projects in the films are all replicable. A "How-to" replicate section can be found on the film's website, which encourages others to recreate these strategies for reducing CO_{2} emissions.
