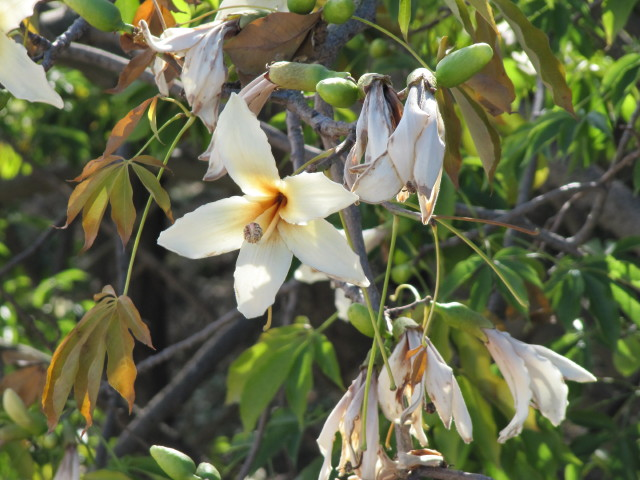
- Flower is white with a golden throat.
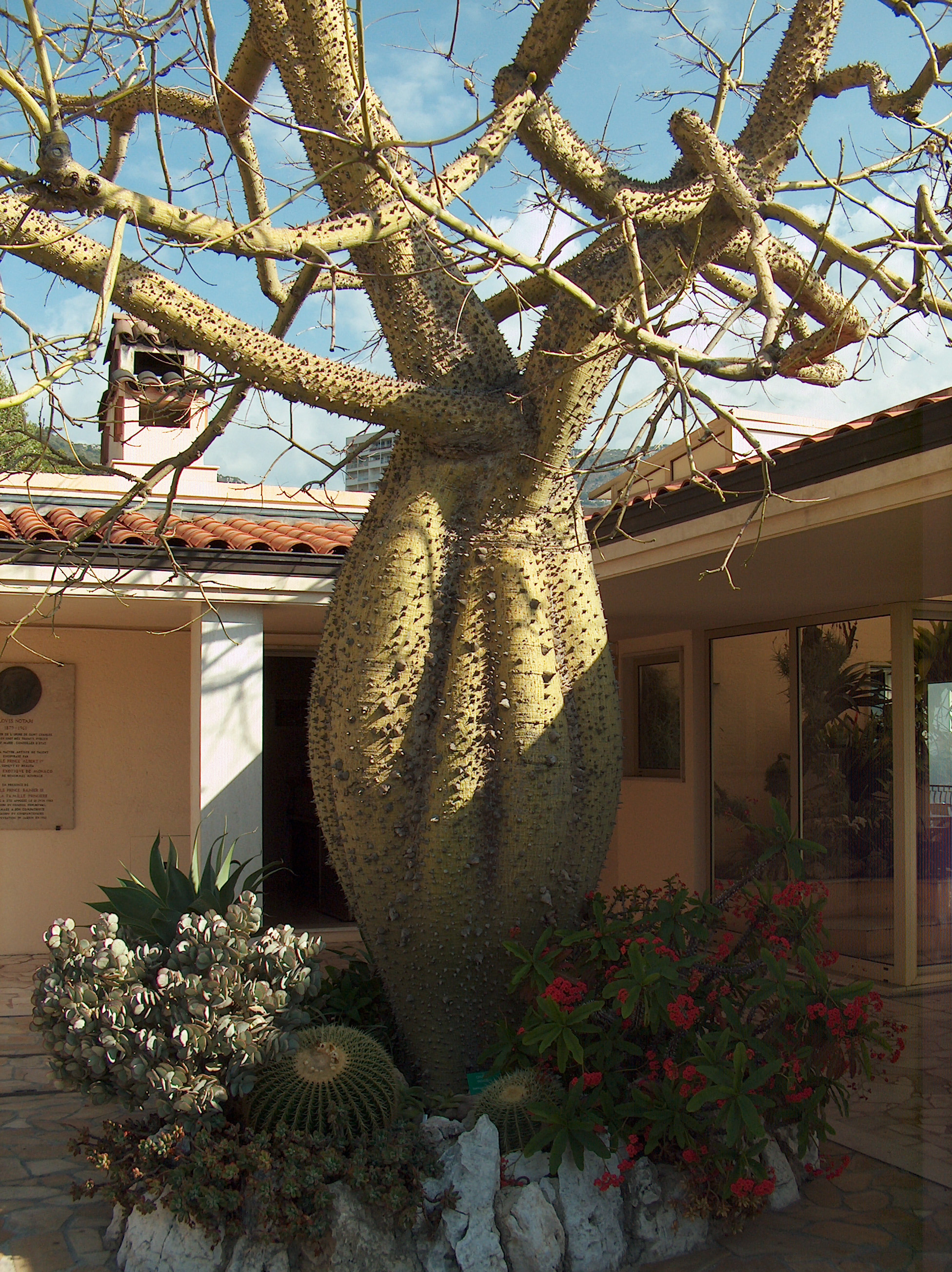
- Bottle-shaped trunk is covered in heavy prickles.

Scientific classification
- Kingdom: Plantae
- Clade: Embryophytes
- Clade: Tracheophytes
- Clade: Angiosperms
- Clade: Eudicots
- Clade: Rosids
- Order: Malvales
- Family: Malvaceae
- Genus: Ceiba
- Species: C. insignis

Binomial name
- Ceiba insignis (Kunth) P.E.Gibbs & Semir

Synonyms
- Ceiba integrifolia (Ulbr.) Ravenna; Ceiba mythica Ravenna; Chorisia insignis Kunth; Chorisia integrifolia Ulbr.

= Ceiba insignis =

Species of flowering plant

Ceiba insignis (syn. Chorisia insignis), the white floss-silk tree, is a species of flowering plant in the family Malvaceae, native to dry tropical forests of southern Ecuador and northern Peru. It has found use as a street tree in scattered cities around the world.
