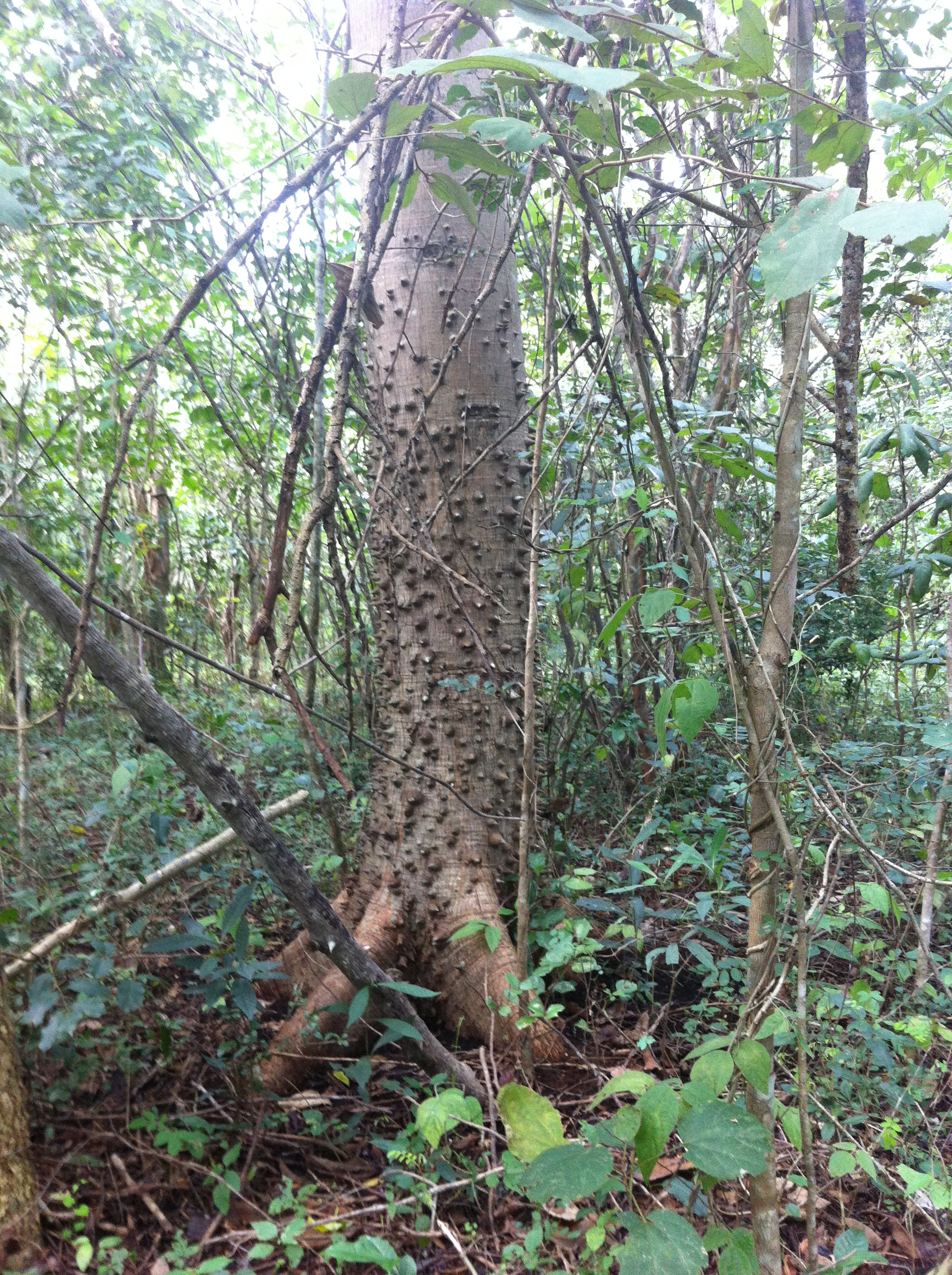

Conservation status
- Least Concern (IUCN 3.1)

Scientific classification
- Kingdom: Plantae
- Clade: Tracheophytes
- Clade: Angiosperms
- Clade: Eudicots
- Clade: Rosids
- Order: Malvales
- Family: Malvaceae
- Genus: Ceiba
- Species: C. aesculifolia

Binomial name
- Ceiba aesculifolia (Kunth) Britten & Baker f., 1896

Synonyms
- List: Bombax aesculifolium Kunth; Bombax axillare Moç. & Sessé ex DC.; Ceiba grandiflora Rose; Ceiba pallida Rose; Ceiba tomentosa (B.L.Rob. ex Pringle) Britton & Baker; Eriodendron acuminatum S.Watson; Eriodendron aesculifolium (Kunth) DC.; Eriodendron grandiflorum (Rose) Conz.; Eriodendron guineense G.Don; Eriodendron tomentosa B.L.Rob. ex Pringle

= Ceiba aesculifolia =

Species of flowering plant

Ceiba aesculifolia is a tree belonging to the Malvaceae family. It can reach up to 30 m (98 ft) in height and has a thick trunk. In its juvenile stages, the trunk is covered with large, conical thorns. The fruit is a giant capsule that encloses its seeds in a thick layer of soft, white, silky fiber. This fiber has been used to stuff mattresses. Handicrafts are made from the bark and thorns. The tree has medicinal properties. It is the sacred tree of the Mayans.

It is also known as ceiba and pochote.

== Description ==
Ceiba aesculifolia reaches a height of 30 m (98 ft), with a trunk densely covered with thorns. It has 5–7 foliolate leaves. Leaflets of range in shape from obovate to oblong-elliptic and are between 3–10 cm long and 1–4 cm wide. They can be acuminate, cuneate, serrated at least towards the apex, glabrous or densely pubescent. Solitary flowers appear in the axils of fallen leaves or somewhat grouped towards the apices of the branches, whitish turning brown inside; irregular and slightly lobed calyx, 1.5–3 cm (0.59–1.18 in) long. Petals are 8–16 cm (3.1–6.3 in) long, with dense yellowish-brown pubescence on the outside; filaments form a narrow, pubescent column approximately 1.5–2 cm (0.59–0.79 in) long. Fruits produced by the plant range from 12–15 cm (4.7–5.9 in) long and can be up to 8 cm (3.1 in) wide.

== Distribution and habitat ==
C. aesculifolia is found in low, dry, deciduous forests, as well as north-central and Pacific zones, at altitudes ranging from 20–850 m (66–2,789 ft). It lives from Mexico to Costa Rica. It flowers January to April, and fruits May to June.

== Taxonomy ==
The species was initially described as Bombax aesculifolium by Carl Sigismund Kunth in 1821, and was later transferred to the genus Ceiba by James Britten and Edmund Gilbert Baker in 1896.

C. aesculifolia contains the following subspecies:

- Ceiba aesculifolia aesculifolia
- Ceiba aesculifolia parvifolia (Rose) P.E.Gibbs & Semir

== Gallery ==
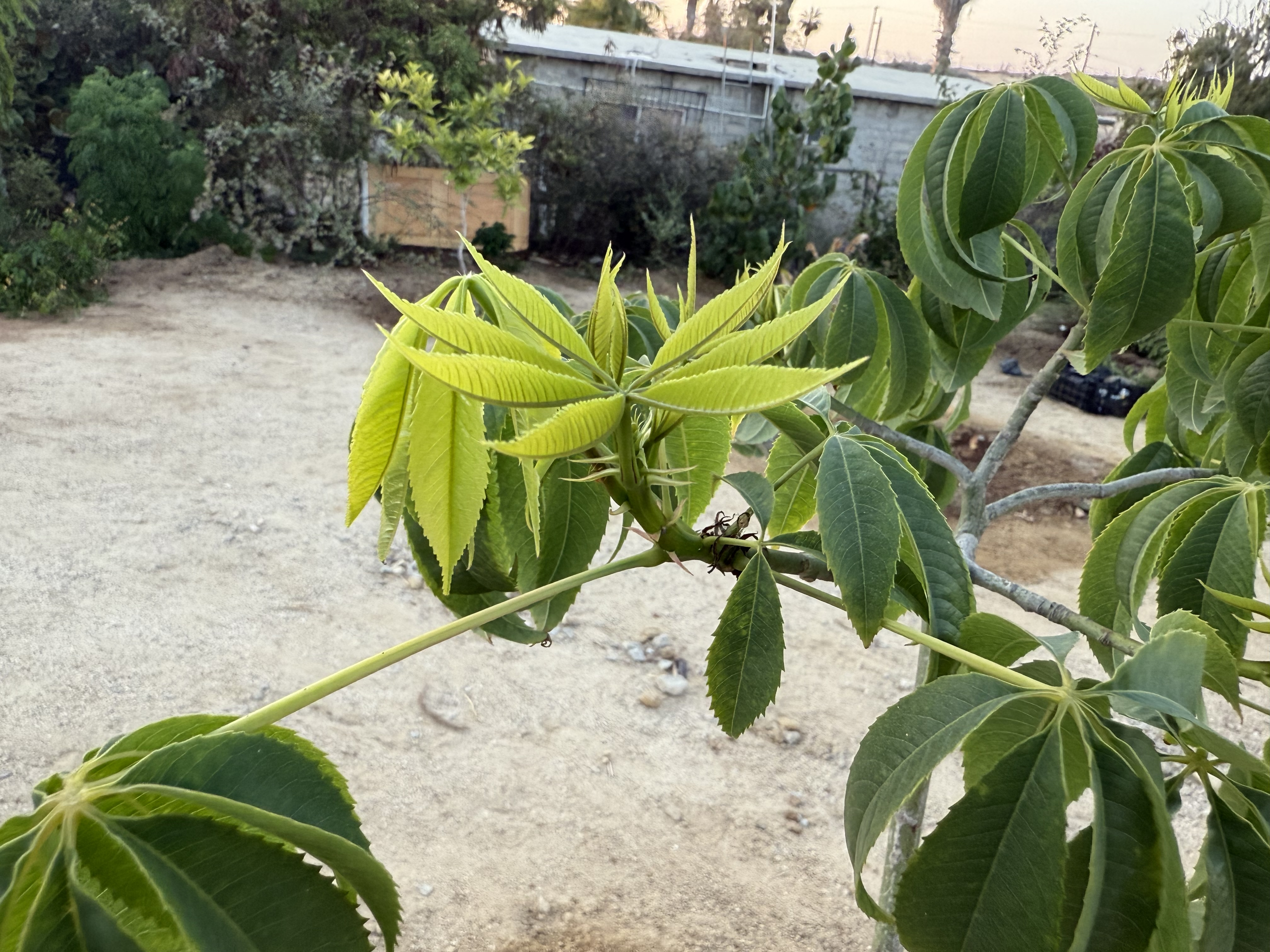
Pochote leaves

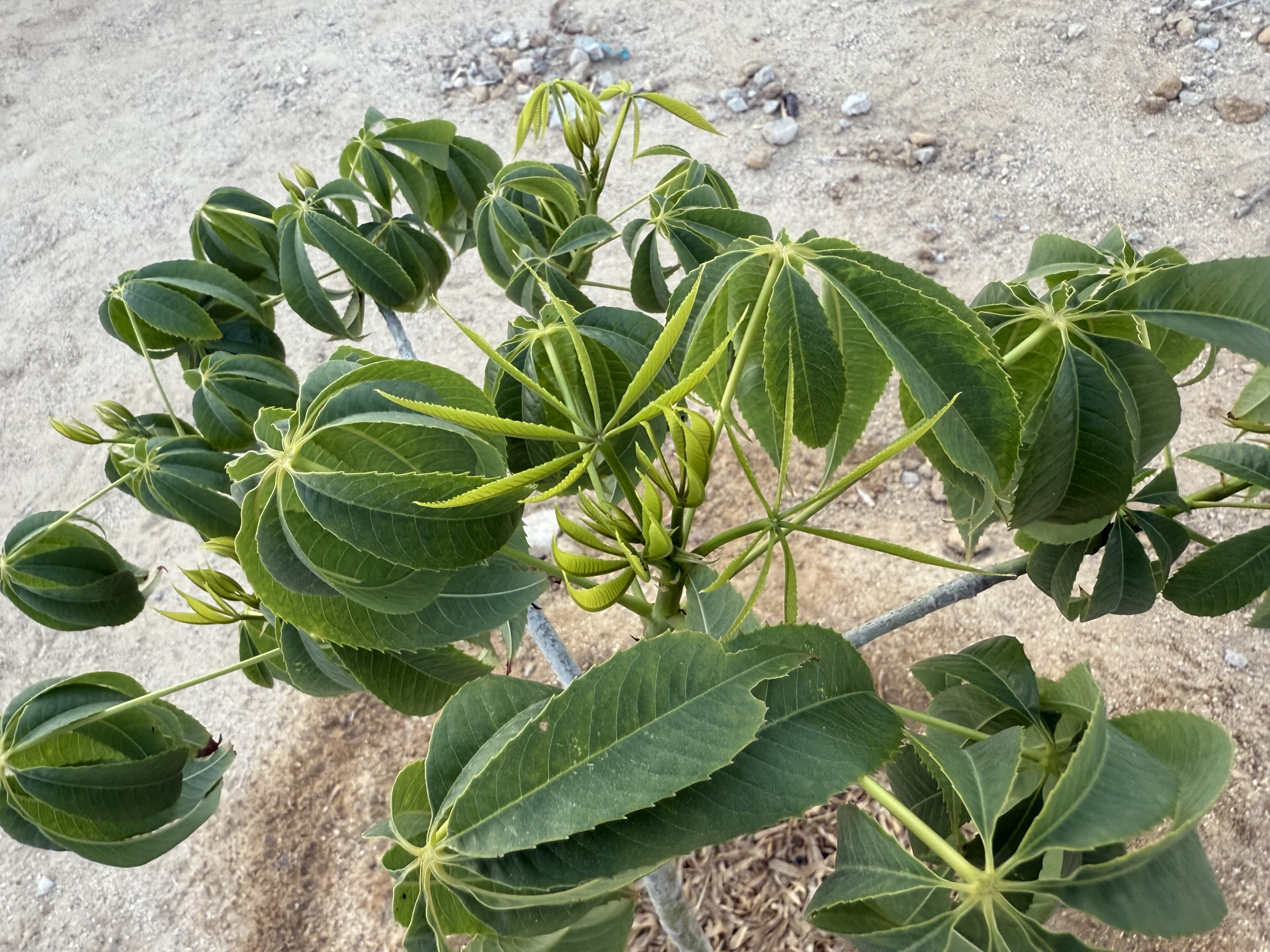
Up-close view of pochote leaves

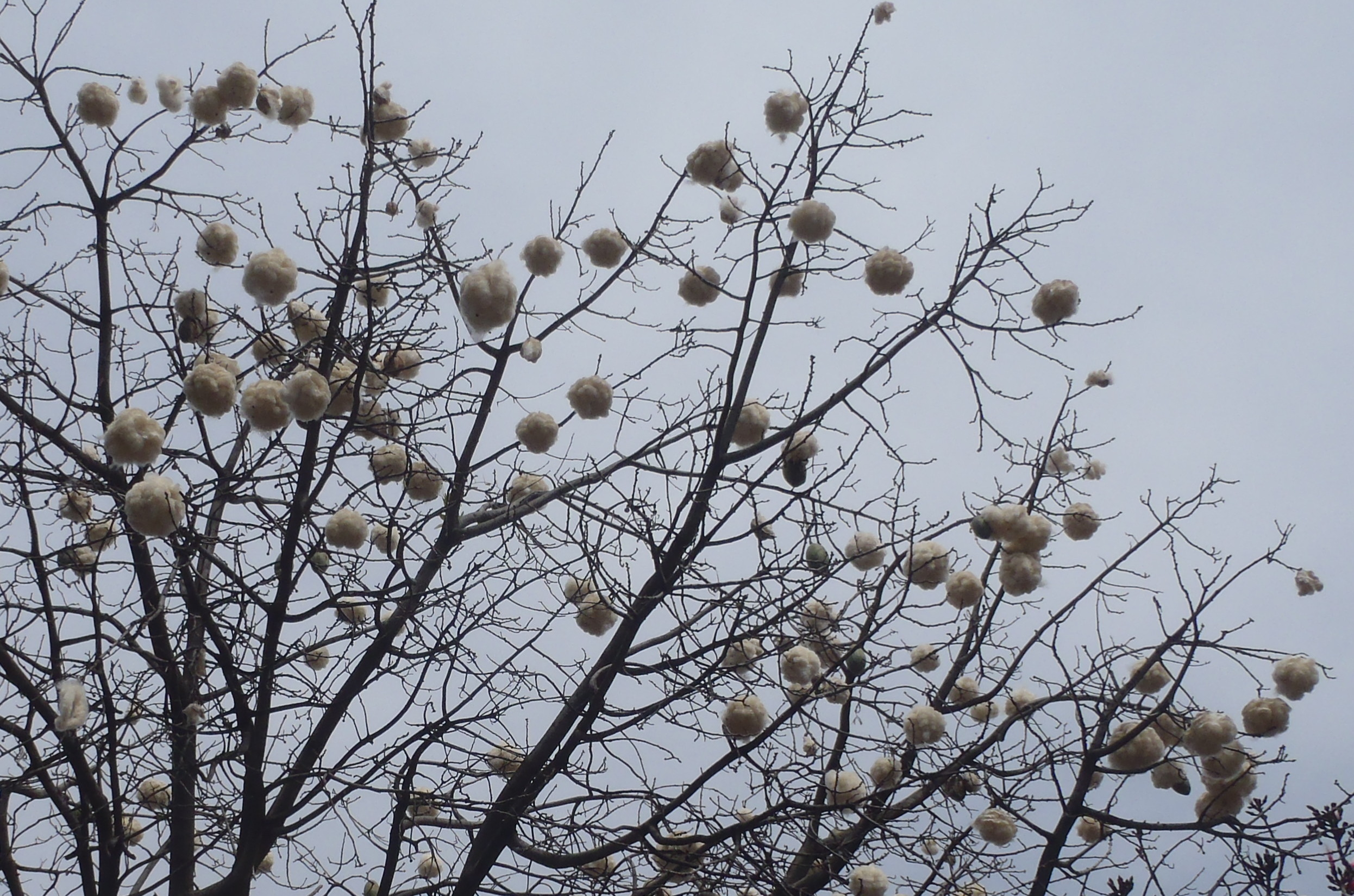
Floss emerging from seeds pods of a pochote

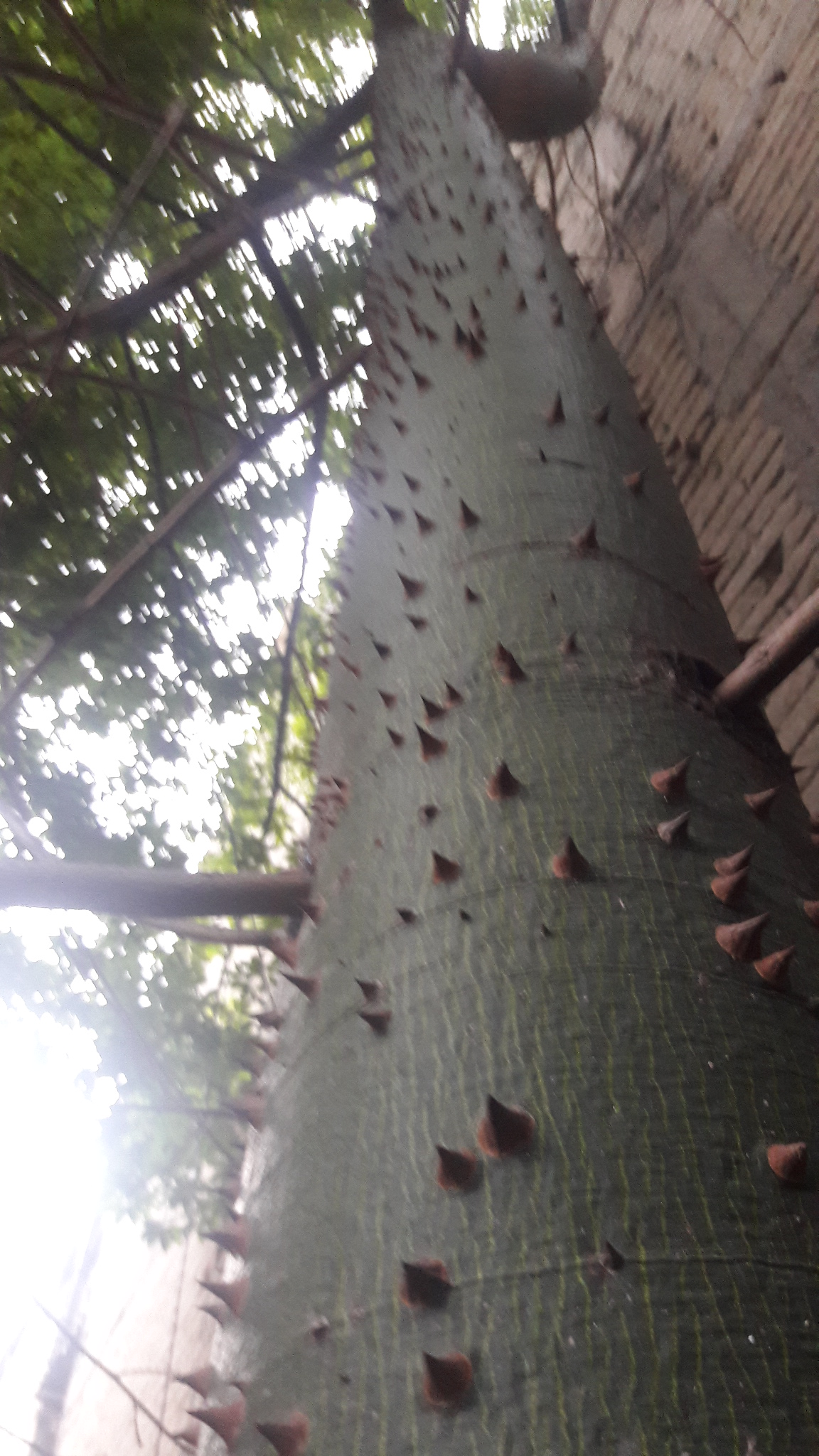
Up-close view of a pochote trunk in Mexico
