= Ceiba schottii =

Scientific classification
- Kingdom: Plantae
- Clade: Tracheophytes
- Clade: Angiosperms
- Clade: Eudicots
- Clade: Rosids
- Order: Malvales
- Family: Malvaceae
- Genus: Ceiba
- Species: C. schottii

Binomial name
- Ceiba schottii Britten & Baker f.

Species of plant

Ceiba schottii is a rainforest tree of Guatemala and southeastern Mexico in the subfamily Bombacoideae of the family Malvaceae. It is distinguished from other Ceiba species by its very large flowers, with petals up to 19 cm long. and a total flower width of 26 cm. It is bat pollinated.
