= Kapok =

Kapok fibre is a cotton-like plant fibre obtained from the seed pods of a number of trees in the Malvaceae family, which is used for stuffing mattresses and pillows, for padding and cushioning, and as insulation.

Kapok may also refer to:

== Plants ==
=== Kapok trees ===
- Trees from which kapok fibre is commonly obtained:
  - Bombax genus, trees and shrubs native to western Africa, the Indian subcontinent, Southeast Asia, and the subtropical regions of East Asia and northern Australia
    - Bombax ceiba, a red-flowering tree, native to parts of tropical Asia, northern Australia, New Guinea, and the Solomon Islands; previously also known as Bombax malabaricum, the 'Malabar kapok'
  - Ceiba pentandra, a native tree of the tropical Americas and West Africa with white flowers, cultivated particularly in south-east Asia for its seed fibre

=== Other kapok plants ===
- Calotropis procera, a shrub with white and purple flowers, known in some areas as the 'kapok plant'; native to Asia and North Africa, an invasive weed in other places
- Cochlospermum fraseri, a yellow-flowering tree known as the 'cotton tree' or 'kapok bush', native to northwestern Australia
- Cochlospermum gillivraei, a yellow-flowering tree, native to northern Australia, with the common name 'kapok'
- Cochlospermum gregorii, a tree of the Bixaceae family, named for the explorer Augustus Charles Gregory and native to the Northern Territory and northern Queensland, Australia; it has the common name 'native kapok'

== Other uses ==
- Kampong Kapok, a Bruneian village
- Kapok Computer, former subsidiary of the laptop manufacturer Clevo
- Adopted as a symbol of Cantonese nationalism, present on the movements flag

== See also ==
- The Great Kapok Tree, a children's book
