= Lynne Cherry =

American writer

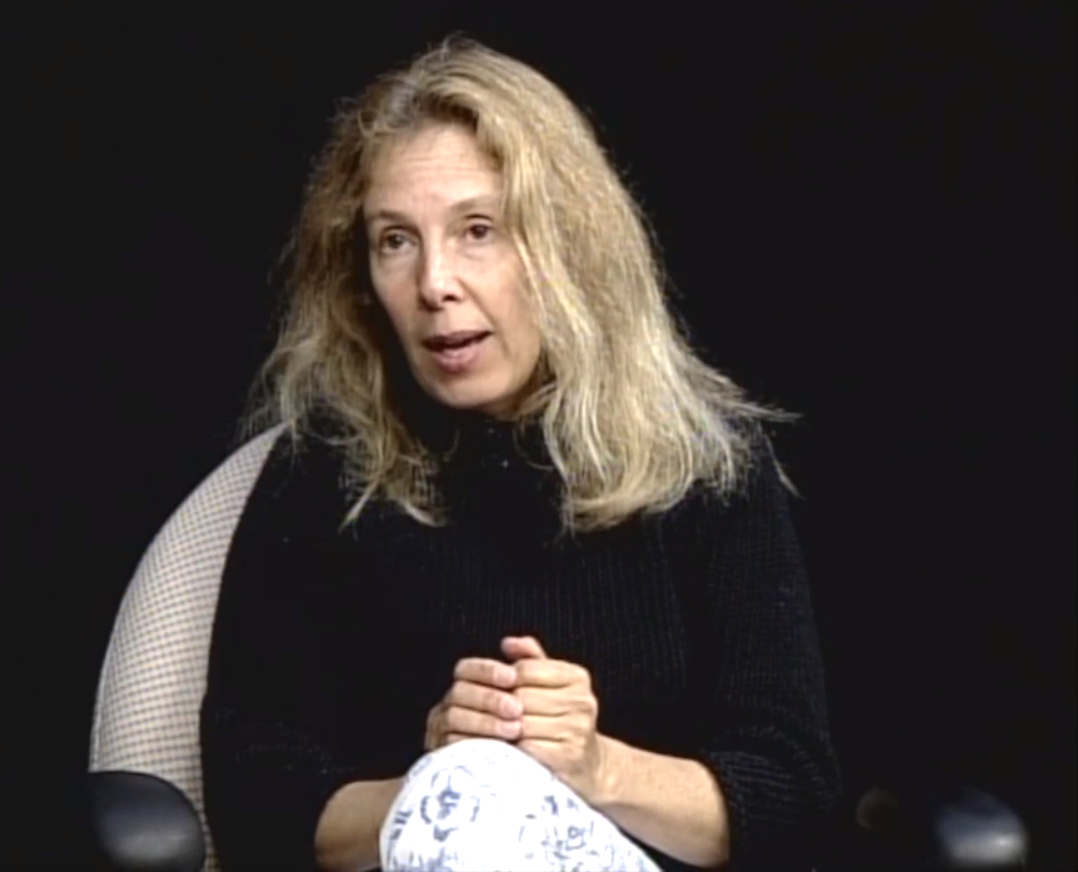
- Born: January 5, 1952 (age 74); Philadelphia, Pennsylvania, U.S.
- Education: Tyler School of Art; Temple University; Yale University (MA)
- Occupations: Author; illustrator; film producer
- Writing career
- Genre: Children's literature
- Website: www.lynnecherry.com

Lynne Cherry (born January 5, 1952) is an American author and illustrator of nature-themed children's books, book essays and journal articles and a film producer. In 2009 she was designated a Women's History Month Honoree by the National Women's History Project.

== Early life ==
Born in Philadelphia, Cherry attended the Tyler School of Art and received her teaching degree from Temple University. She earned an MA in History from Yale University.

== Children's Book Career / Artist in Residencies ==
Cherry is known first and foremost as a distinguished author and illustrator of many popular children's books. She has also founded and directed two non-profit organizations, the Center for Children's Environmental Literature and Young Voices for the Planet. She has been an artist-in-residence at the Princeton Center for Energy and Environmental Studies, the Princeton Environmental Institute, the World Wildlife Fund, Cornell University, the Smithsonian Institution's Museum of Natural History, the Smithsonian Environmental Research Center, NASA Goddard, the Benjamin Center at SUNY, New Paltz and, more recently, at the Archbold Biological Station.

Lynne Cherry's most famous book (which has sold over a million copies and was on the New York Times best-seller list),The Great Kapok Tree, is a picture book about the ecological importance of the Amazon rainforest. It is a staple in schools and has been performed as a play or musical in thousands of schools worldwide.

Lynne has written and/or illustrated over 30 books including "How Groundhog's Garden Grew", "If I Were in Charge of the World and Other Worries: Poems for Children and their Parents" by Judith Viorst, "Flute's Journey" (a book about the trials and tribulations of a wood thrush named Flute) (bird migration), and "A River Ran Wild" (which discusses the history, the pollution, and eventual cleanup of the Nashua River in Massachusetts).

== Producing and Directing Young Voices for the Planet Film Series ==
Since 2008, Lynne has focused her attention on abating climate change and highlighting the power that young people have to take action and alert adults to the climate crisis. She is founder of the non-profit Young Voices on Climate Change aka Young Voices for the Planet. Through YVFP she has produced 13 short documentary films, the Young Voices for the Planet film series, dedicated to inspiring young people to believe in their ability to make change and take action inspired by the youth success stories in the films. The films have been licensed by American Public Television and were broadcast on PBS stations nationwide. An accompanying curriculum was on the PBS Learning Media website. The films have been licensed by National Geographic, the Children's Environmental Literacy Foundation (CELF), Earth Day Network and dozens of other organizations and are used widely by educators to help develop youth self-efficacy, i.e. their belief in themselves to make a difference in the world.

Cherry's Young Voices for the Planet films document:

- California kids getting a ban on plastic bags in Team Marine
- Florida students saving their school $53,000 in energy bills in Dreaming in Green
- 11-year-old Felix Finkbeiner from Germany planting a million trees (Plant for the Planet)
- When the three 9-year-old girls in Save Tomorrow see the other Young Voices for the Planet films, they are inspired to testify at their Town Meeting where they succeed in overturning a bill prohibiting solar panels on town buildings. (Solar panels were then installed on all town buildings). Olivia's Birds and the Oil Spill features a girl from Long Island, NY, who raised $200,000 to help save and clean oiled birds from the BP spill.
- Longing for a Local Lunch showcases getting fresh, local, healthy & nutritious food in the cafeteria and calculating the "food miles" that their cafeteria fare travels .
- The most recent film, Words Have Power, features ten-year-old Jaysa Mellers who testifies before the Bridgeport City Council and is instrumental in convincing them to shut down the coal fired power plant that is causing her asthma.

Cherry also wrote a chapter for the National Geographic book Written in Water and the chapter "Kids Can Save Forests" in Treetops at Risk (Springer Verlag, 2013), edited by Margaret D. Lowman (Canopy Meg), et al. She has spoken out widely eschewing gloom and doom in climate change education and communication - on an NPR radio show and in book chapters "Teaching Climate Change with Hope and Solutions" in the book Education in Times of Environmental Crisis: Teaching Children to be Agents of Change (Routledge, 2016) and blogs.

== Honors and recognition ==
Lynne Cherry's book How We Know What We Know about Our Changing Climate, written with the late photojournalist Gary Braasch, has won more than 15 awards including the American Association for the Advancement of Science (AAAS) award for the Best Middle School Science Book of 2009. Cherry's book The Sea, the Storm and the Mangrove Tangle, which she wrote and illustrated herself, won the first Green Earth Book Award for picture books in 2005.

Lynne Cherry has been Artist in Residence at Princeton University, the Smithsonian, Woodwell Climate Research Center, the Woods Hole Oceanographic Institution and the Marine Biological Laboratory in Woods Hole, Massachusetts, on Cape Cod. She has been a visiting scholar in the Geosciences Department at the University of Massachusetts, Amherst; the Cary Institute of Ecosystem Studies in Millbrook, NY; the Institute of Arctic and Alpine Research (INSTAAR) at the University of Colorado, Boulder; and the Cornell Lab of Ornithology in Ithaca, NY. More recently, Lynne was Artist in Residence at Archbold Biological Station in Venus, Florida.
