= The Great Kapok Tree =

Book by Lynne Cherry

- Author: Lynne Cherry
- Illustrator: Lynne Cherry
- Language: English
- Subject: Environmentalism
- Genre: Picture book
- Publisher: Harcourt Brace Jovanovich
- Publication date: 1990
- Pages: 40 pp.
- ISBN: 978-986-7942-78-4
- LC Class: PZ7.C4199 Gr 1990

The Great Kapok Tree is an American children's picture book about rainforest conservation. It was written and illustrated by Lynne Cherry and was originally published by Harcourt Brace Jovanovich in 1990. The book is dedicated to Chico Mendes, a Brazilian rubber tapper trying to protect the rainforests, who was murdered in 1988. The 30th Anniversary edition of the book was published in 2020 by Harper Collins with new information at the end about climate change and tropical rain forests.

== Plot summary ==
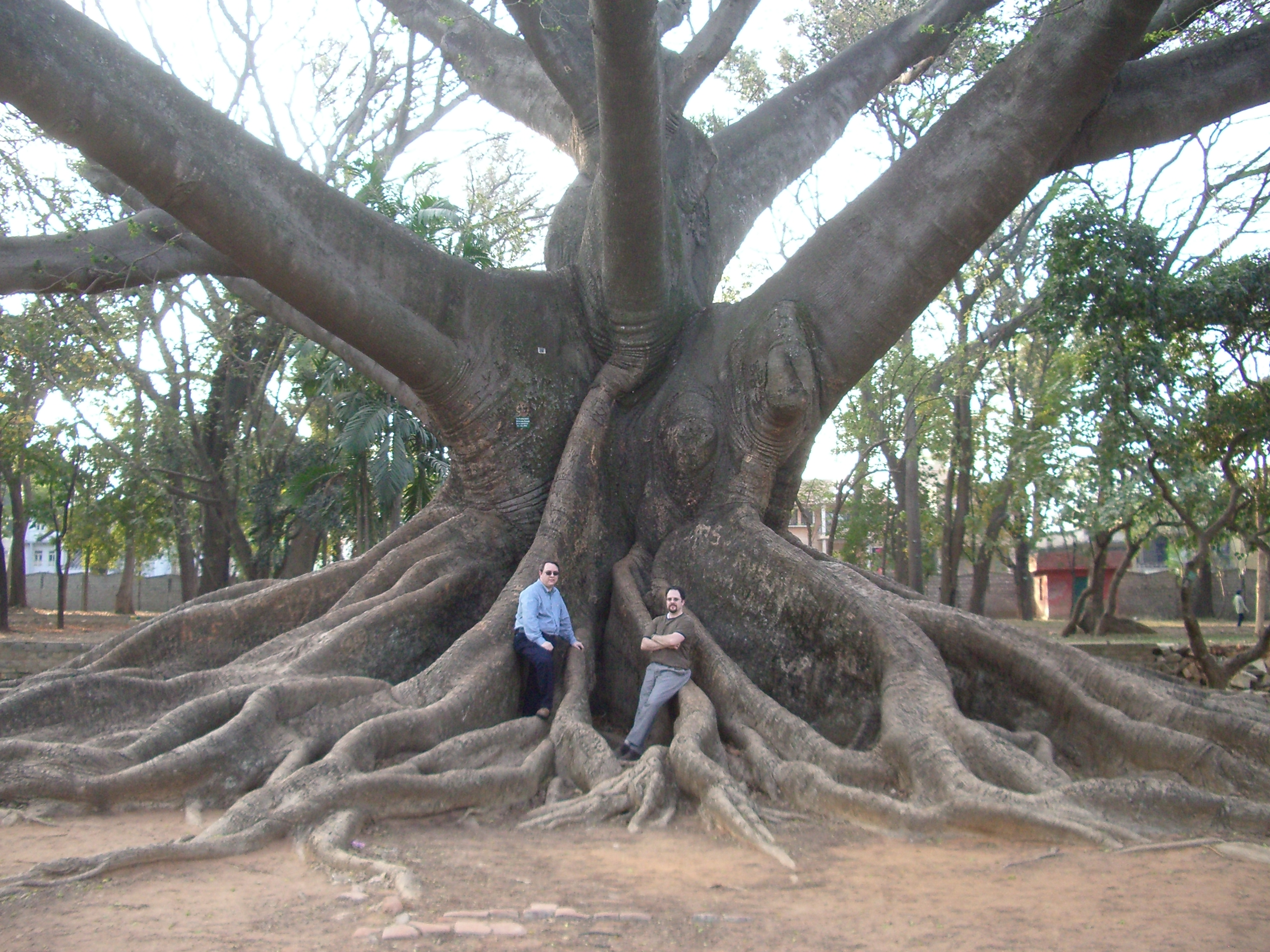
Base of a colossal specimen of the kapok tree Ceiba pentandra, with two individuals seated on its buttress roots to indicate scale

Two woodcutters go to the Amazon rainforest. They stop beside a fine Ceiba tree and the larger man points to the tree and leaves. Lulled by "the heat and hum of the forest" the other woodcutter falls asleep beneath the Great Kapok Tree. While he sleeps, the many species of animals that live in the tree (including frogs, snakes, sloths, birds, anteaters and monkeys) come down to speak to him. They explain not only their dependence on the tree, but also the importance of the tree to the world. The man wakes up and sees the beauty of the rainforest. He picks up his axe and the word of the rainforest creatures echo through his mind. He has a moral dilemma. There is the tension in the story as he decides what to do. Will he follow the big man's orders or follow his own conscience? He considers what the animals have told him, and decides to leave the tree standing, dropping his axe and departing from the rainforest a changed man. (The young readers of the book let out sighs of relief!)

== Inspiration ==
In 1989, Lynne Cherry learned about the deforestation of the Amazon rainforest and thought that maybe young people could help to save it. She was attending graduate school at Yale University at the time and she wrote The Great Kapok Tree while on a train ride between New Haven and Washington, DC. Soon thereafter, Tom Lovejoy, then at World Wildlife Fund, gave Cherry an artist in residency at WWF and he and the other scientists there provided her with their rainforest photographs to use as reference. Cherry also immersed herself in the "tropical forest" in the New York Botanical Garden. Lovejoy and other WWF biologists, and Brian Boom, the director of the NY Botanical Garden, facilitated her travel to Manaus, Brazil, to experience the rainforest firsthand. She explored the vast forest around Lovejoy's research site, part of his famous "forest fragments" project, and sketched and photographed the plants and animals there.

When the book was released in 1990, coinciding with the twentieth anniversary of Earth Day, Cherry told a reporter, "When kids grow up, in another 20 years, they'll be the people making the decisions. If they're raised with these ideas ingrained in them, it will affect national policy. We will have raised a whole generation of environmentalists."

== Symbolism of kapok tree ==
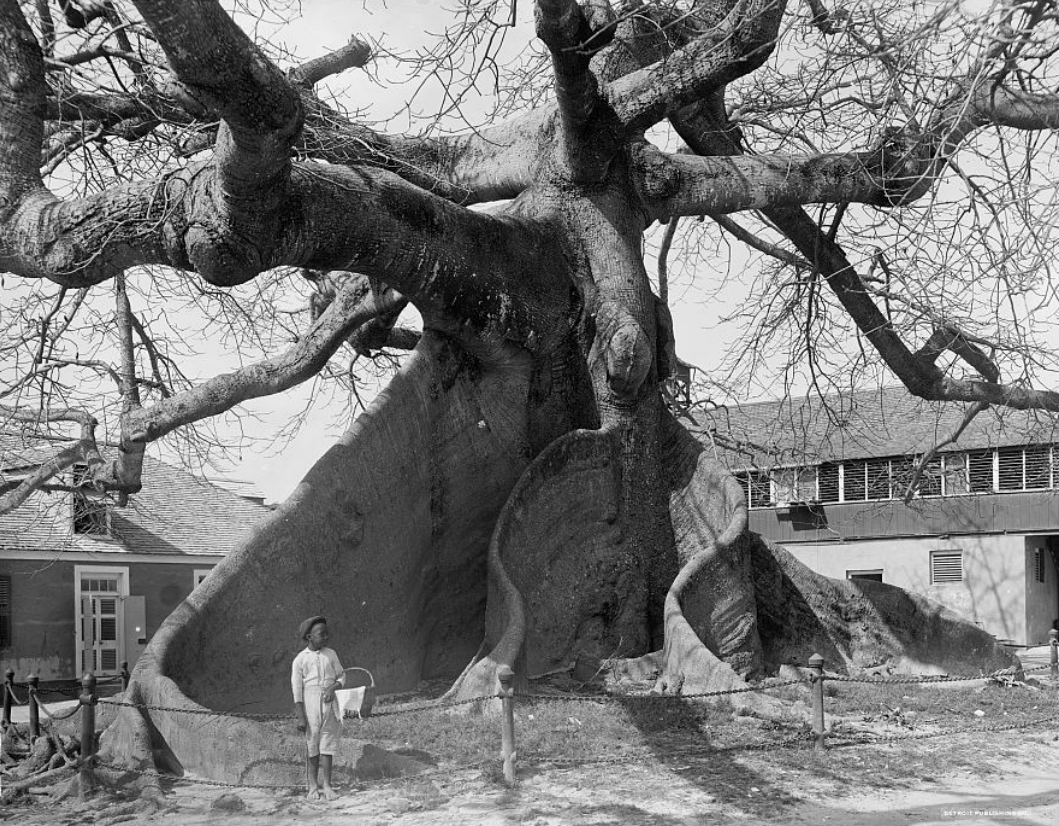
Child beside base of another huge kapok tree, growing in the Bahamas

Cherry's choice specifically of a Kapok tree (genus Ceiba) as a symbol to represent the need for forest conservation worldwide is particularly appropriate. Kapok trees, with their imposing height and girth (some species can grow to over 73 m (240 ft) in height and up to 5.8 m (19 ft) in diameter), feature largely in Native American mythologies (particularly that of the Maya) as embodiments of the Axis mundi, sustaining the entire cosmos by linking heaven, earth and the underworld (compare the mythical ash tree Yggdrasil). The compassionate woodman who decides to spare a single tree can thus be understood as standing for a decision by the human race to refrain from destroying the natural world in order to preserve it for future generations.

== Reception ==
Upon its release, the book received mixed reviews from some critics. Kimberly Olson Fakih in the Los Angeles Times praised it for its "splendid paintings in tropical colors" but said the story was undermined by "soap-box oratory". Similarly, Susan Bolotin in The New York Times said the book had "lush illustrations" but suffered from "peculiar language" and "preachiness". She said that Cherry was "jumping on the environmental bandwagon" but, actually, for years, Cherry had been leading the bandwagon. However, the large color illustration from the book that accompanied this review piqued readers' interest and paved its path as a best-seller. The first printing of 15,000 copies sold out within a few weeks after the book's release, by 1995, it had sold a quarter-million copies, and it has now sold over a million copies including many foreign language translations. The book is beloved by millions of children who are very moved by the plight of the animals and are relieved when the woodcutter spares the tree. Many American elementary teachers use the book in their classes. Students have put on thousands of plays and musicals based on the book to educate their parents and communities about the importance of saving the rainforest.

The Great Kapok Tree received a Charlotte Award from the New York State Reading Association. It has also been named an NSTA-CBC Outstanding Science Trade Book for Children, an American Booksellers Association "Pick of the Lists", and an International Reading Association Teacher's Choice. In September 2020, the publisher, Houghton Mifflin Harcourt, published a 30th Anniversary paperback edition with a new letter from the author and back matter about what kids can do to save rainforests. Although her book has raised awareness for over 30 years, Cherry is sad about the continued destruction of the rainforest. A 2014 Mongabay article describes Cherry's continued work empowering youth to save the natural world.

== See also ==
- The Lorax
