= El Ostional =

Town in San Juan del Sur, Rivas, Nicaragua

El Ostional is a coastal town on the Pacific Ocean, in the municipality of San Juan del Sur and Rivas department in south-west Nicaragua. It is located 170 kilometers (105 miles) south of Managua and 10.5 kilometers (6.5 miles) from the border with Costa Rica. The region consists of the communities of Monte Cristo and San Antonio. El Ostional is becoming recognized as a quaint spot for voluntourism, sport fishing, birdwatching, turtle, dolphin, and whale watching, Cultural heritage events and is a vacation spot for Nicaraguan families and foreign tourists interested in immersing themselves in rural community life.

Its population is approximately 1000, consisting largely of 120 families engaged in fishing or the tourism industry and few foreigners from the United States, Canada and Europe. While the local economy was, for many years, based on fishing, crops, and cattle, it has been making aggressive shifts towards tourism in the last 20 years.

Its geographical location has given it certain advantages and disadvantages, allowing the citizens to survive economic and food crises. Its inhabitants, living by the Pacific Ocean with seasonal flowing rivers and tributaries, are engaged in artisanal fisheries and agriculture, thus solving their basic food needs, work and other tasks. A disadvantage is deeply felt, that as a community that is adjacent to neighboring Costa Rica, families migrate there in search of work to improve their living conditions.

El Ostional, set inshore from a crescent-shaped bay was settled by emigrating indigenous people once they discovered the large volume of fish, turtles, and oysters (El Ostion is Spanish for oyster) in the mangrove and the cove which opens to the Pacific Ocean. The mangrove water was also an excellent source for processing salt to preserve food.

The town is near the site of the filming of Survivor: Nicaragua and Survivor: Redemption Island. The seasons aired in 2010 and 2011 respectively. The 2014–15 Survivor season Survivor: San Juan del Sur was also filmed 10 miles nearby. and consequently nearby the location for Survivor: Worlds Apart

== History ==
Upon arrival of the colonizers, Rivas territory was occupied by the Nicarao (or speakers of Nahoa, the Nahuatl language) from San Juan Soconusco, Mexico. Nicaraos seized the territory now known as Greater Nicoya, evicting the Chorotegas probably about 700 years ago which in turn had expelled the Kiribisis tribes.

Greater Nicoya, a sub-area archaeological culture, includes all or part of Matagalpa, Chontales, Boaco, Esteli, Chinandega, León, Managua, Carazo, Granada, Masaya, Rivas and Guanacaste in Costa Rica, bordered to the north by the Gulf of Fonseca, east shores of the lakes of Nicaragua and Managua, and the extreme south eastern volcanic range of Guanacaste where "(the) elements of subsistence (were) also based on agriculture, but with a high percentage of exploitation of marine resources and coastal basic settlements".

Although the original inhabitants of Ostional, like those of many other sites, disappeared with the Spanish conquest in 1522, abundant evidence preserved archaeological of its indigenous population in four known sites to date, near the current river town, as was the custom, the best known being Cemetery Indian in the area of the Miraflor only 2 kilometers from the urban center.

In the indigenous cemetery, discovered by chance in the year 1995, when some armadillo hunters found pieces of ancient pottery in a burrow, were found later buried human remains, sitting on stone metate or within crocks with objects such as necklaces of white, black and green beads and some with jade figurines were common in the "southern sector (of Greater Nicoya and gave) the use of jade as a status symbol, metallurgy, ceramics slip salmon ... " and within the stonework noteworthy as markers of elite production metates and heads of non-utilitarian hub. The characteristic of the Greater Nicoya grindstones are the Tripod ... Its surface shows few signs of use, indicating that they were not household metates, but only used during certain ceremonies or rituals related to agriculture or death ..." Despite the confirmation of the presence of Nicoya culture in Ostional, the area to date has not been formally studied, nor protected, giving looting in the 1990s, when hundreds of pieces were sold or given away to visitors and neighboring residents.

=== Colina 155 ===
Colina 155, also referred to as Miraflor Hill, is a landmark hill located in El Ostional. A number was designated by the military for the many hills in Nicaragua. This particular coastal hill overlooks Costa Rica. On May 25-June 2, 1979, during the Nicaraguan Revolution, which encompassed the overthrow of the Somoza regime, the Southern Front (Frente del sur) of the Sandinista National Liberation Front (FSLN) consisting of young guerrilla cadres between the ages of 15 and 19, took up Colina 155, opened trenches, camouflaged themselves, and waited for the National Guard's counteroffensive. This historic event marked the beginning of the FSLN 's final offensive to liberate Nicaragua from the Somoza dictatorship.

“There they tied the National Guard. There were such tough fights that during the day the planes, the helicopters, the gunboats that were in the sea and the infantry that were coming up the hill fell on them."

For the Somoza guard it was a resounding defeat. Colina 155 was one of the points where civilians and guerillas alike were crushed with military power, yet managed to hold their position for 11 days while a troop in El Naranjo expelled the National Guard troops from Nicaragua at Penas Blancas.

Annually, on July 19, a Day of Commemoration is conducted by the Sandinista Youth as the survivors and families devote themselves to honoring the heroes and martyrs.

During the offensive, at the hilltop, one mature Tempisque Tree (Sideroxylon capiri) on Colina 155 provided shade and protection to the Southern Front during gunfire. Bullet casings during gunfire remained around the tree trunk till they were removed in 2007 during a property survey.

=== The 1992 Nicaraguan tsunami ===
On September 2, 1992 a magnitude 7.0 earthquake off the central coast of Nicaragua generated a tsunami that devastated many communities along the Pacific Coast. Run-up values along the coast ranged from 2m in the north and south to up to 10m in some central locations. Run-up values in El Ostional were approximately 5m. As a result of the tsunami homes along the shore and the cemetery suffered damage.

== Oceanography ==
The coasts in the bay of Ostional are classified as the result of continental collision contact of the Cocos Plate with the primary coastal escarpment and the secondary coasts with high terraces up to 50 meters, and the side beaches resulted from marine deposition.

== Flora ==
According to the classification of Holdridge life zones, natural vegetation of San Juan del Sur is tropical dry forest (in the coastal area of low elevation). The vegetation of the Municipality of Ostional is varied and one can find deciduous forest, tropical forest, deciduous forest and mangrove gallery, where about 130 species of plants, including trees, ornamental plants and crop species predominate. The main indigenous plant species of gallery forest on the banks of the river and forests of the hills of Ostional are the papaturro (Coccoloba caracasana), madero negro (Gliricidia sepium), cornezuelo (Vachellia collinsii), chilamate (Ficus insipida), Guácimo de ternero (Guazuma ulmifolia), jenízaro (Albizia saman), pochote (Pachira quinata), guayacán (Guaiacum), palo brasil (Haematoxylum brasiletto), jícaro (Crescentia alata), madroño (Calycophyllum candidissimum), sacuanjoche (Plumeria species), capulin (Muntingia calabura), and introduced species like neem and eucalyptus.

The mangrove forest is wetland type, characterized by the existence of mangrove trees that develops on both banks of the estuary and in an area that stretches almost 300 m to the urban area, is an important natural element in the study area because besides being the "children of the sea" where many marine species develop, it preserves the lush green landscape of mangrove trees.

== Fauna ==
In the town and surrounding area there is a great diversity of terrestrial and aquatic fauna in the latter that differ from the river, mangrove, in the marina. In the land there are approximately about 180 species of wild vertebrates, mostly birds, followed by small mammals and reptiles; identified are: possum, aardvark, bush pig, pisote, bat, howler monkey, spider monkey, white-headed capuchin, tayra, ocelot, agouti paca, puma, jaguar, white tail deer, black iguana, green iguana, snakes, boa constrictor, weasel, armadillo, three-toed sloth, owl, woodpecker, oriole, parrot, magpie, rook, pelican and swallowtail butterfly.

The fauna in the marine ecosystem of the Bay of Ostional have relatively short lives due to fishing, yet populations are typically high in extent. 304 species of fish and shellfish have been classified, while it is estimated that approximately 1,423 species exist on the Pacific Coast. Some of the predominant sea fauna include octopus, shark, caiman, varied species of crabs, slugs, oysters, olive ridley turtle, and a variety of seabirds such as gulls.

== Geography ==
=== Climate ===
Tropical and subtropical dry broadleaf forest climates have monthly mean temperature above 18 °C (64 °F) in every month of the year and typically a pronounced dry season, with the driest month having precipitation less than 60 mm (2.36 in) of precipitation. The Köppen Climate Classification subtype for this climate is "Aw". (Tropical Savanna).

Climate data for El Ostional, Nicaragua
| Month | Jan | Feb | Mar | Apr | May | Jun | Jul | Aug | Sep | Oct | Nov | Dec | Year |
|---|---|---|---|---|---|---|---|---|---|---|---|---|---|
| Mean daily maximum °C (°F) | 26 (79) | 28 (82) | 29 (84) | 28 (82) | 28 (82) | 26 (79) | 27 (81) | 28 (82) | 27 (81) | 27 (81) | 27 (81) | 27 (81) | 27 (81) |
| Mean daily minimum °C (°F) | 22 (72) | 23 (73) | 23 (73) | 23 (73) | 23 (73) | 22 (72) | 23 (73) | 24 (75) | 22 (72) | 23 (73) | 23 (73) | 23 (73) | 23 (73) |
| Average precipitation mm (inches) | 15 (0.6) | 2.5 (0.1) | 0 (0) | 10 (0.4) | 130 (5.1) | 270 (10.5) | 180 (7.2) | 200 (7.8) | 300 (12) | 460 (18) | 110 (4.4) | 28 (1.1) | 1,710 (67.3) |
Source: Weatherbase

== Environmental and natural hazards ==
The environmental situation is generally of degradation and deforestation of the gallery forest along the river, mangrove forest in the estuary and the forests of the hills, which has resulted in a reduction of river flow, the weakening of steep soils, the little recharge groundwater supplies and the disappearance of many plant and animal species from actions and changes that human activity has produced over the years. The mismanagement of solid, liquid and chemicals is especially impacting bodies of water and urban space. After Hurricane Mitch some environmental problems sharpened, generating vulnerability scenarios mainly due to deteriorating watershed by the lack of vegetation and the occupation of land or very low slopes very pronounced for housing.

=== River ecosystem ===
The main problem is the Ostional river flow has decreased to insomuch that in summer it is dry partially, mainly due to the general deforestation of the basin, of which has been overexploited, subject to logging and intensive grazing, as well as water withdrawals for irrigation and constructions, reducing the ability of water conservation. To this is added the disposal of agricultural waste and solids from the population pollute its banks and detrimental water to aquatic life.

=== Estuarine ecosystem (estuary) ===
The estuary, currently occupying only an area approximately 18 acres, has been affected especially in the south west bank which has been partially invaded by urban area shelter building, the mangrove being drastically reduced which adds to its overexploitation, and more recently by the solid waste pollution and recurrent droughts of the river, causing stream flow reduction.

=== Marine ecosystem ===
This ecosystem is characterized mainly by reducing the number of individuals in different species and in some cases extinction. An example of this is the disappearance of the shell lobsters and reducing the arrival of turtles, product exploitation and for non-compliance of the moratorium, which now continues to threaten colorful fish and rays that are exported without control. Also, improper practices at artisanal fisheries affect the damage to these marine species, for example, using trammel net many pieces get stuck on rocks and corals, causing useless fish kills. Also the trash dumped on the beach causes negative effects on marine species, because plastic bags that fall to the estuary and mangrove are drawn to the sea and dolphins and turtles mistake them for jellyfish and swallow, choking and dying, and pelicans collect bottle caps believing they are animals, choking and dying.

=== Ecosystem beach ===
On the beach there are varieties of species of crustaceans and shellfish such as crabs, starfish, jellyfish, snails, turtles and seabirds, but these have decreased by human action, among which the dumping of solid waste and to overuse of trade and consumption. The most endangered turtle species are arriving at this beach in very few numbers and their eggs are stolen. Oysters, after a massive exploitation in early 2007 by Salvadorans, with permission from MARENA, it's not known whether they can recover.

=== Orographic ecosystem ===
The hills suffer an acute deforestation due to logging of their forests, partly because the old prevailing logging and practice of ranching, aridity in summer, as well as at this time only bushes grow before farmers burn their brush for renewal of pasture in winter. The most visible effects of this practice are reflected in a severe erosion that causes loss of fertile soil layer by streams of rainwater, altered water regime of the basin, decreased regenerative capacity of forests and loss of biodiversity.
