= Friends International Support Group =

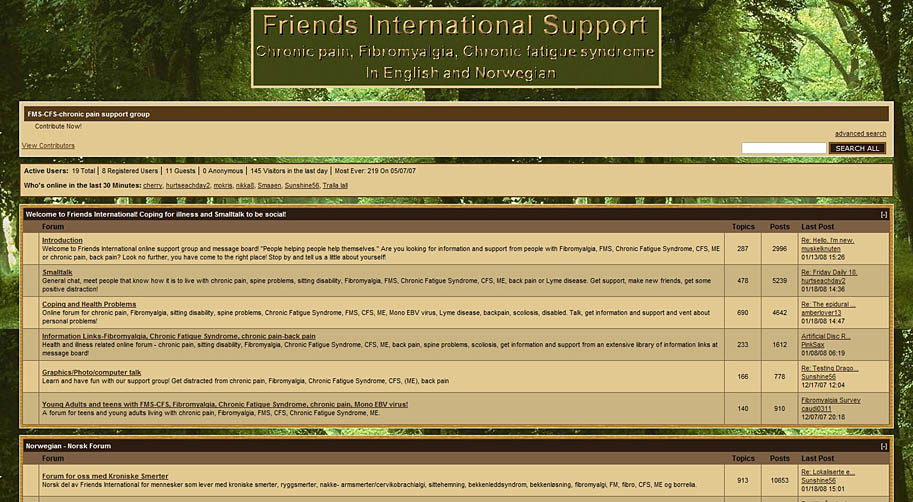
A screenshot of the friends message board

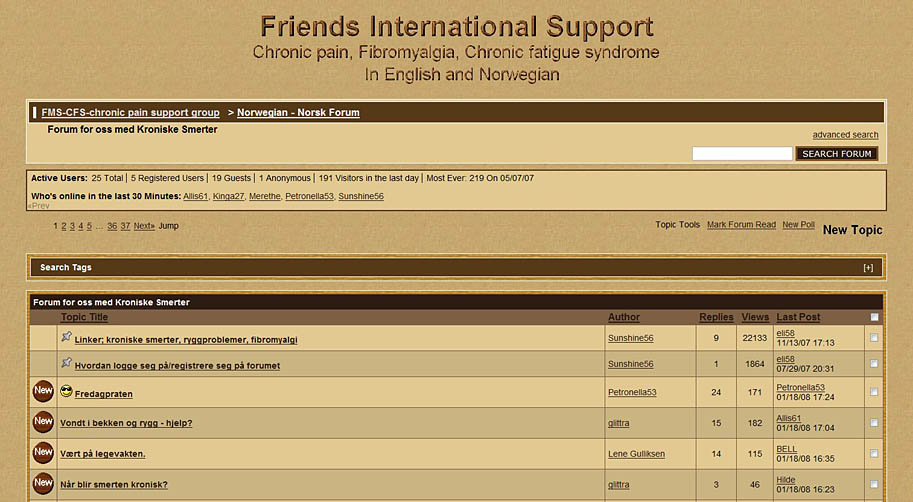
A screenshot of the Norwegian section of the friends message board

Friends International Support Group (aka Friends) is an internet forum using the phpBB message board software, in which members support each other while living with chronic pain. Friends international is a support group based on the pillars of self help with more than 2 million visits, around 200,000 posts since its founding in 2001 and average 800 new posts a week. The board is connecting disabled people around the world, that otherwise would have lived an isolated life. Together they have raised awareness of chronic pain and especially sitting disability that used to be an unrecognized disability.

== History ==
Friends International was created April 18, 2001, by Mosken Bergh in Norway and Linda Jones. It was a volunteer joint effort between an American and a Norwegian, two women that met in Cyberspace while both lived with disabling chronic pain. Three Norwegian women now run the board together with American and Norwegian moderators. It is the only online support group for people with chronic pain that is based on both the English and the Norwegian language. The members are from all over the world. It is a typical international volunteer project that would not be possible if it weren't for the Internet.

On April 10, 2007, Friends International officially moved from ezBoard to Yuku and in March 2012 the forum started using phpBB software.

On May 19, 2008, Friends International Support Group was registered as a volunteer organization in the Norwegian register called Brønnøysundregisteret, with the identity number: 992 598 271.

== Internet tools for disabled ==
Common discussion topics include medical information, coping strategies and personal experience related to chronic pain and similar illness and individual support for people in their daily struggle. People living with disabling chronic pain often feel overwhelmed, isolated, and discouraged. Many of the members suffer from reduced ability to sit, also called Sitting disability. Some suffer from both reduced mobility and sitting disability. People with sitting disability are recognized as being one of the most isolated groups of people in the world. Many of them are bedridden because they have to lay down most of the day.

Friends international is an online forum connecting people that otherwise would have been isolated in their home. To be able to connect the members are using the Internet tools which includes using headsets and speech recognition software instead of keyboard and computer mouse. Some of them need to have the computer in a special stand over their bed. Others have their computer connected to a large TV screen on the wall. Together they are working on improving the quality of their life and to raise awareness for especially sitting disability in several languages around the world. The owner of the board is running the group by using speech recognition software from her bed.

== The pillars of self-help ==
The support group is based on the "Pillars of self-help":

• Self-help builds on the participant's own innate resources.

• Everybody participates at their own risk.

• The group is based on give-and-take, equal worth, and tolerance.

• The group is based on active participation, not on the role of a passive recipient.

Self-help groups are usually organized and managed by their members, usually volunteers and not professionals. Friends International is also run by volunteers and not professionals. It is however organized and moderated by experienced administrators with a declared corrective moderation policy. The moderators are using a staff room combined with instant communication tools to discuss any problems or questions concerning the group.

Humor and positive thinking have become an important part of the group's philosophy and attitude. New members are encouraged to educate themselves about their own disease and to take charge of their own life. The message board is divided in an English-speaking part and a Norwegian speaking part. Both parts are divided into one smalltalk section and a coping and illness section.

== Media Recognition ==
The international online support project created by Mosken Bergh and Linda Jones, has been mentioned by CNN TV and the CNN website and NRK at the Norwegian national TV Norwegian Broadcasting Corporation. Also read the article about Mosken Bergh and Linda Jones and their online project in the newspaper Tønsberg Blad: Nettfeber, read about the newspaper Tønsberg Blad. Read the article in the Norwegian National Centre for Documentation on Disability: Norwegian article and the article in the Norwegian newspaper Verdens Gang; Norwegian article in VG, where the support group is mentioned as a volunteer organization.
