= Standing desk =

Desk for working while standing up

Illustration of a man working at a standing desk

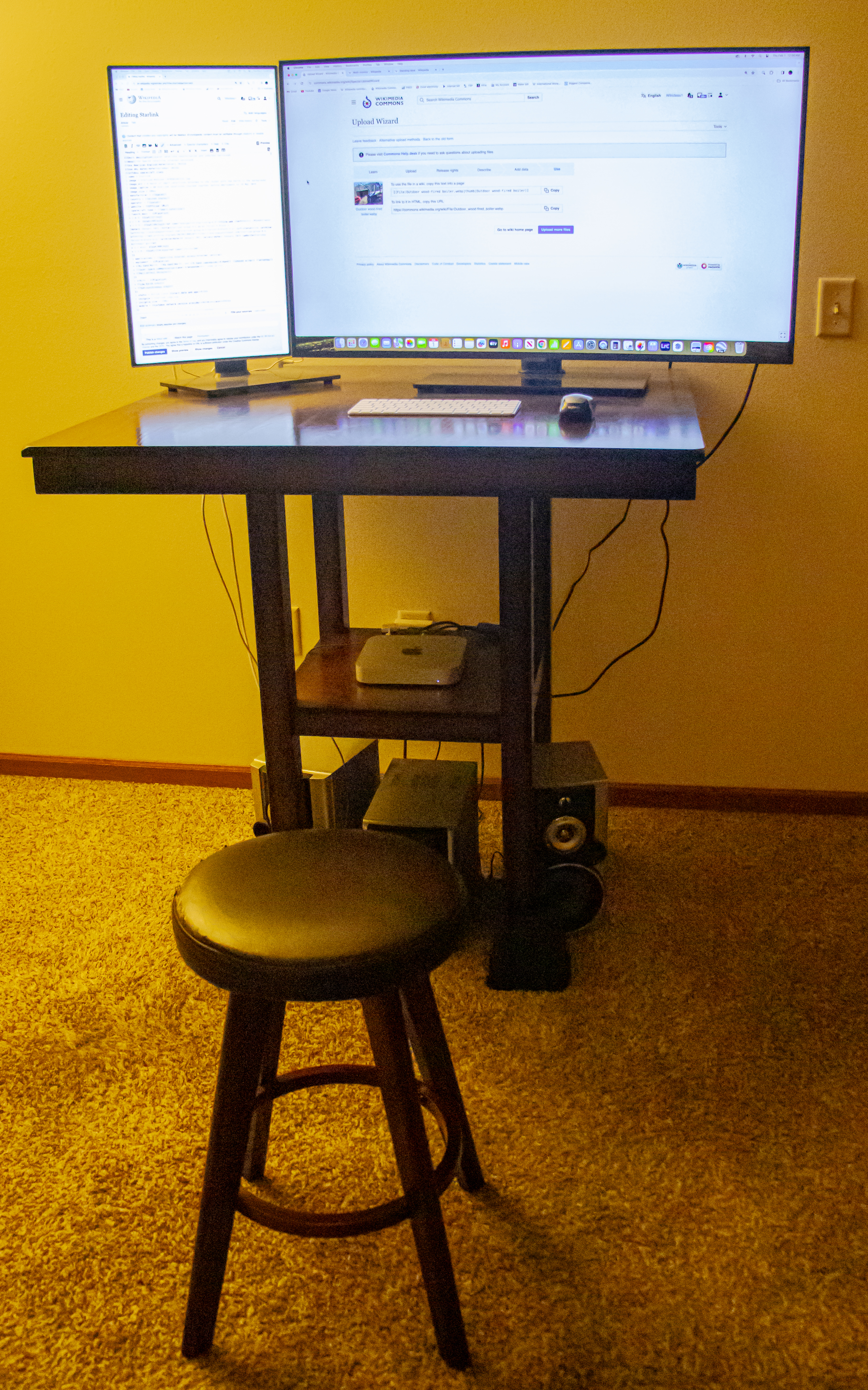
Standing desk with multi-monitor setup and vertical monitor

A standing desk or stand-up desk is a desk conceived for writing, reading or drawing while standing up or while sitting on a high stool. Standing desks are designed to be of adjustable height so they can be used while sitting, or crafted to a height that can only be used while standing.

== History ==
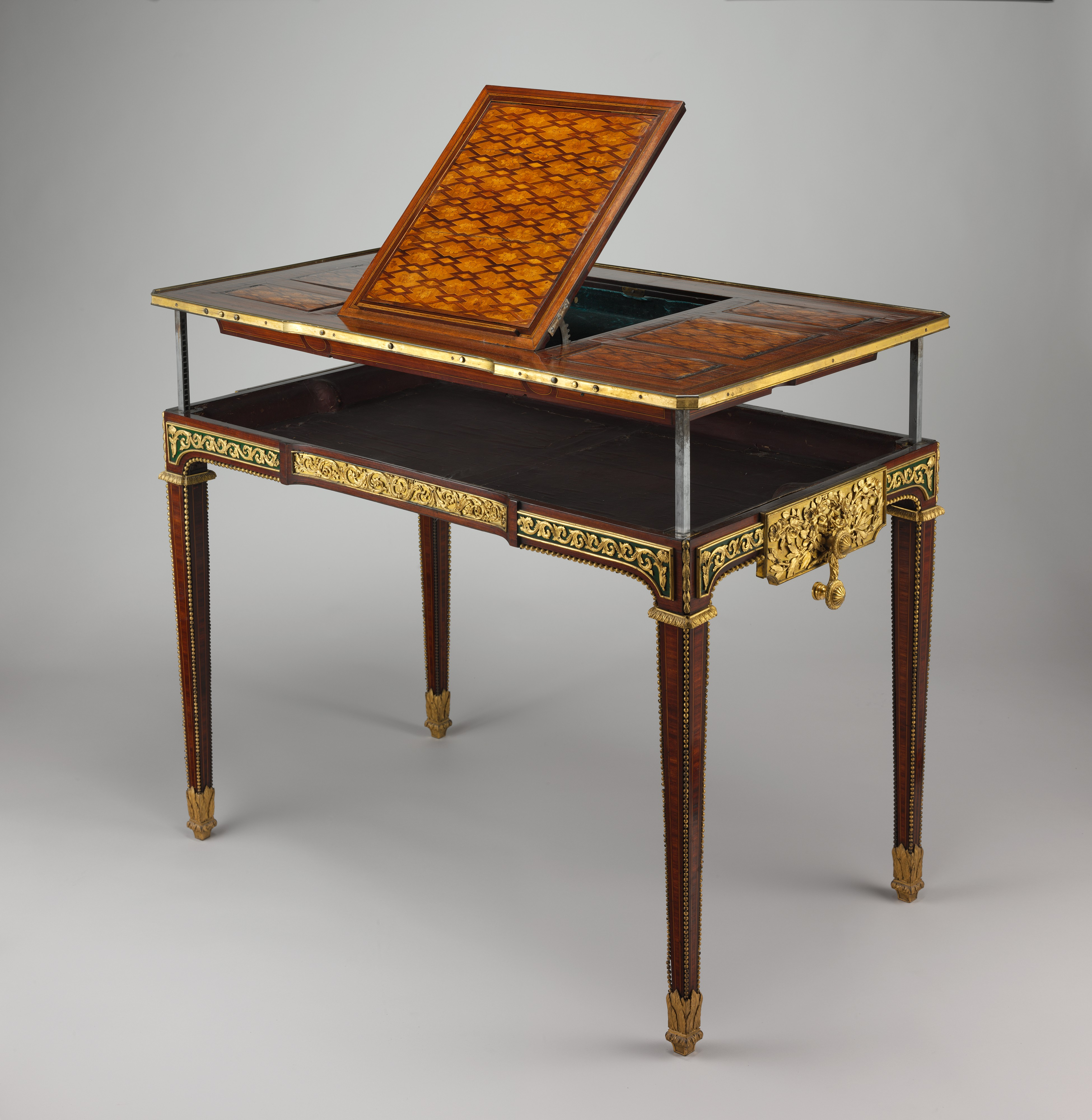
1778 sit-stand desk made for Marie Antoinette to use while pregnant.

Several writers and statesmen wrote standing up: Thomas Jefferson, Charles Dickens, Winston Churchill, Ernest Hemingway, Henry Wadsworth Longfellow and Vladimir Nabokov. Some of them had specially made desks or lecterns.

== Variations ==
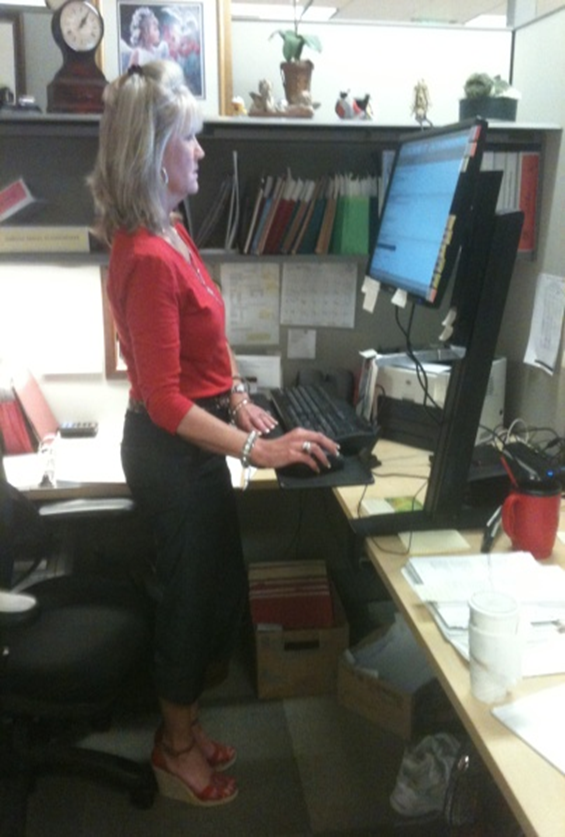
A woman using a sit-stand desk in its standing position.

Standing desks have been made in many styles and variations. Standing desks may be specialized to suit particular tasks, such as certain variations of the telephone desk and desks for architectural drafting. Some standing desks may only be used while standing while others allow users to sit or stand by adjusting the desk height with an electric motor, hand crank, or counterbalance system. Some desks are also constructed like teacher's lecterns, allowing them to be set on top of an existing desk for standing, or removed for sitting.

While height of most seated desks is standardized, standing desks are made in many different heights ranging from 70 to 128 centimetres (28 to 50 in). Ideally the height of a standing desk fits the height of its individual user. With seated desks, adjusting the height relative to the user can be accomplished by adjusting the height of the user's chair. However, because users of a standing desk move around more than when seated, using a pedestal to adjust the user's height is not practical.

To solve this issue, a standing desk may either be custom-made, to suit the height of the user, or made with adjustable parts. For writing or drafting, the angle or slant of the surface may be adjustable, with a typical drawing table or table à la tronchin. If the desk is made for computer use, the legs may be adjustable. Another option is a platform made to sit on top of a regular seated desk that raises the desk's surface to a useful height for standing. Such platforms may be fixed height or adjustable.

A height-adjustable desk or sit-stand desk can be adjusted to both sitting and standing positions; this is purported to be healthier than the sit-only desk. Sit-stand desks may be effective at reducing sitting time during the work day between 30 minutes and two hours per working day but the evidence is low quality.

Some antique standing desks have an open frame with drawers, and a foot rail (similar to those seen at a bar) to reduce back pain. A hinged desktop could be lifted in order to access a small cabinet underneath it so that the user could store or retrieve papers and writing implements without needing to bend over or stand back from the desk.

== Effect on health ==
Low-quality evidence indicates that providing employees with a standing desk option may reduce the length of time some people sit at work in the first year. This reduction in sitting may decrease with time. It is not clear how standing desks compare to other work-place interventions to reduce the length of time employees are sitting during the work day.

Sit-stand workstations may reduce low back pain among people in the workplace. In a sedentary population, changing posture may reduce the chance of developing low back pain.

There is no international consensus on recommended levels of sitting and standing while at work, and suggested workplace practices vary in different countries. Research suggests that standing desks may help reduce sedentary time during the workday and encourage light physical activity. A 2014 study published in Preventive Medicine found that introducing standing desks in workplaces led to significant reductions in sitting time among employees. More recent findings suggest potential links between standing desk use and improvements in productivity and musculoskeletal comfort, although the long-term health benefits remain a subject of debate.

== See also ==
- Lectern, a type of upright desk
- List of desk forms and types
- Right to sit
- Standing chair
- Standing wheelchair
