= Saburee Babajide Bakre =

Nigerian monarch (1960–2023)

Oba Saburee Babajide Bakre

9th Agura of Gbagura
- Reign: 21 May 2019- 14 June 2023
- Coronation: 18 August 2019
- Predecessor: Halidu Adedayo Olaloko
- Born: 22 June 1960; Ibadan, Southern Region, Colony and Protectorate of Nigeria
- Died: 14 June 2023; Lagos
- Burial: Abeokuta
- Spouses: Omobolanle Omowunmi Bakre
- House: Egiri
- Father: Olayinka Bakre
- Mother: Latifah Bakre
- Religion: Islam
- Occupation: Customs Officer

Saburee Babajide Bakre , born June 22, 1960, was a Nigerian monarch. He was the 9th Agura of Gbagura (one of the five sections of Egbaland). He died on the 14th of June, 2023.

== Early life and education ==
Saburee Babajide Bakre was born on the 22 of June, 1960 to the family of Prince Olayinka Bakre and Latifah Bakre in Ibadan. He started his primary school education in IICC primary school, Inalende, Ibadan, and thereafter proceeded to Egba High School and later to Ansar-ud-deen College, Isolo, Lagos, where he completed his secondary education in 1981. After the completion of his secondary education, he proceeded to Ogun State Polytechnic, now (Moshood Abiola University of Technology ) where he obtained a Higher National Diploma (HND) in Business Administration in 1986. He also obtained certificates from the School of Business and Management, American University of Sharjah, Dubai, and Hamburg Port Training Institute GmbH Hamburg Germany in July and October 2010 respectively.

== Career ==
Saburee Babajide Bakre joined the Nigerian Customs Service in 1988 where he rose to the rank of Chief Superintendent. He was in service till the 21st of March 2019 when he was confirmed as the new Agura of Gbagura by the Ogun State Government under Governor Ibikunle Amosun.

== Obaship Tussle ==
Shortly after he was confirmed as the new monarch of Gbagura land, there ensued a tussle in which a lawsuit was filed by the Egiri ruling house seeking to nullify the appointment of Saburee Babajide Bakre as the Agura of Gbagura.

The claimants, in an amended writ of summons, claimed that the monarch "is not a descendant of any lineage of Egiri Ruling house, lacks the prerequisite locus standi to vie for Agura of Gbagura stool and his selection/election, presentation and/or appointment and installation as Agura of Gbagura is null and void."

== Personal life ==
Saburee Babajide Bakre was a Muslim and was married to Omobolanle Omowunmi Bakre. The union was blessed with four children. He died on the 14th of June, 2023.
