= Treadmill desk =

Exercise machine

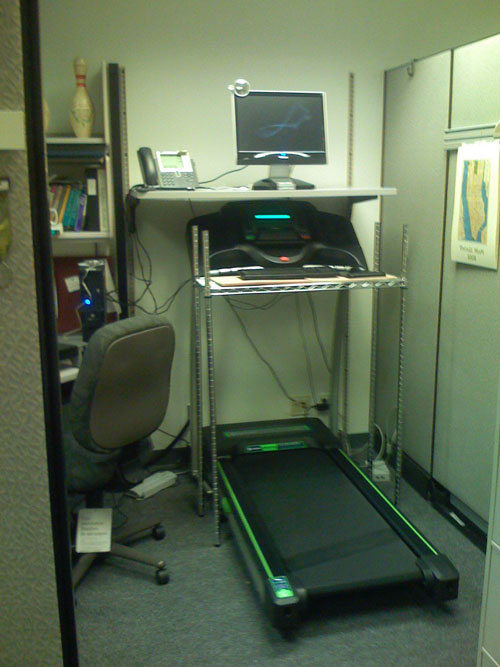
Homemade treadmill desk

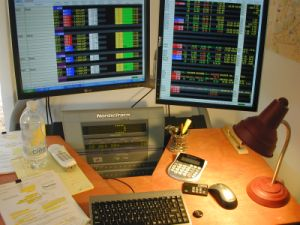
Homemade treadmill desktop

A treadmill desk, walking desk or treadmill workstation is a computer desk that is adapted so that the user walks on a treadmill while performing office tasks. Persons using a treadmill desk seek to change the sedentary lifestyle associated with being an office worker and to integrate gentle exercise into their working day.

== History ==
Persons with a sedentary lifestyle are at increased risk for heart disease, diabetes, and lower than average life expectancy. The desk treadmill is an exercise machine which office workers may use to get more physical activity during their work day. On the premise of increasing productivity and health, treadmill desks were designed to help users incorporate standing and walking into their work routine.

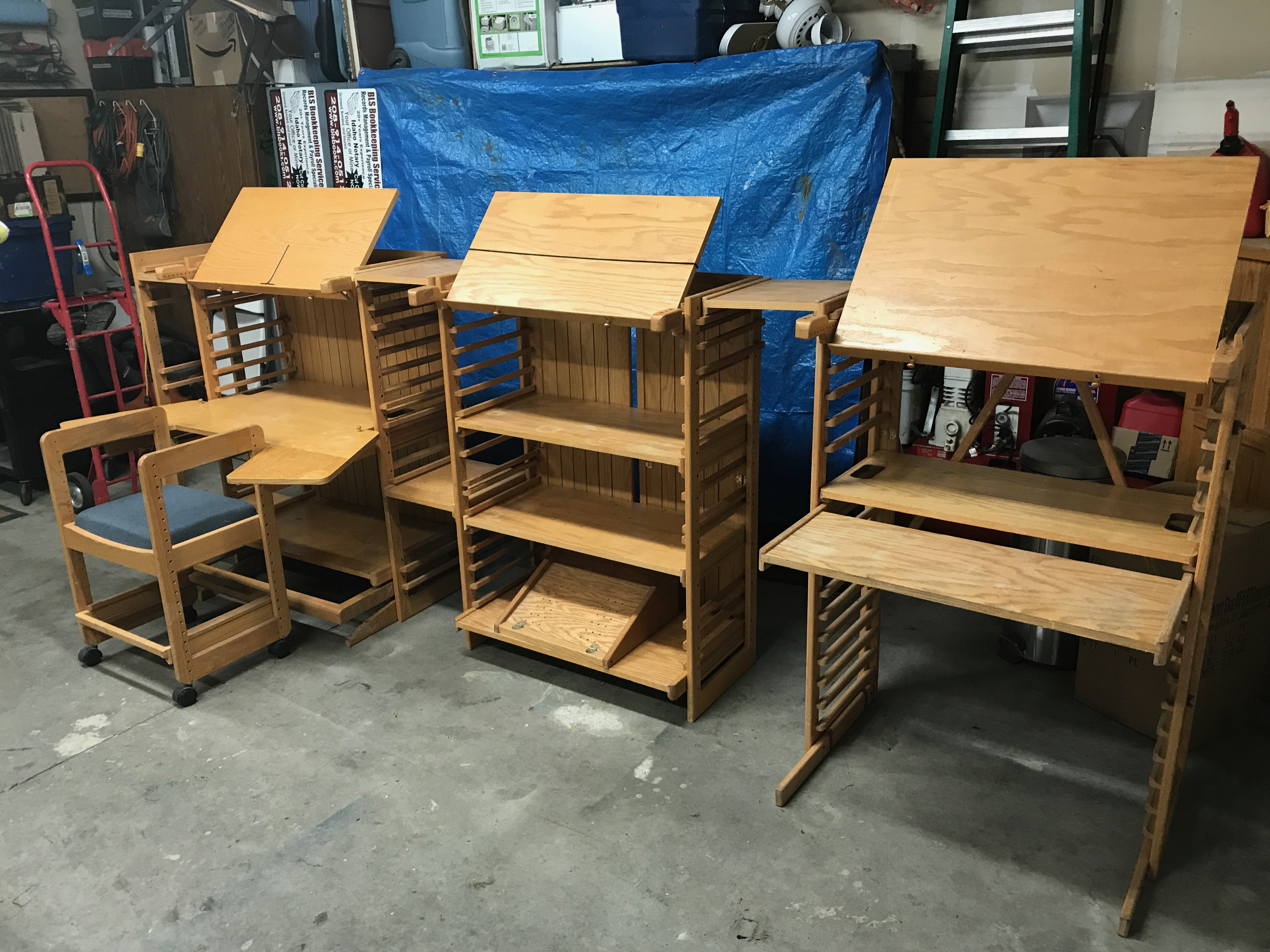
Working models of Edelson Treadmill Desks

Nathan Edelson first proposed the idea of a treadmill desk. and published the first peer reviewed articles on the topic. His lightweight, portable version of a desk for use with a treadmill was patented in 1993. Edelson produced several prototypes that were used in a home and work office since the early 1990s with utilizing treadmills, stationary bicycles, and standing uptight to work. (see photos of prototypes)

Dr. Seth Roberts, a professor of psychology from UC Berkeley, was an early user and designed a treadmill desk in 1996.

The New York Times credits Dr. James Levine, an endocrinologist at the Mayo Clinic, as the popular inspiration for the treadmill desk. He developed the concept as part of his work with non-exercise activity thermogenesis, constructing a treadmill desk by placing a bedside hospital tray over a $400 treadmill.

After testing a treadmill desk in 2006 for several months under the supervision of Dr James Levine, Roger Highfield helped popularize the idea in the UK. He now uses one in the Science Museum in London and has advocated their widespread adoption.

In 2009, the TrekDesk Treadmill Desk entered the market as the first height adjustable desk with a universal design which fit any existing treadmill. In 2013, novelist Amanda Filipacchi wrote an essay for the Wall Street Journal about buying a LifeSpan Fitness treadmill desk for herself and TreadDesk's the Tread for her partner after reading about Susan Orlean having a treadmill desk .

In 2015, Move To Excellence began distributing LifeSpan Treadmill Desks in the Middle East. In 2018, the Director of the Department of Health in Abu Dhabi launched the 10k steps a day challenge while walking on a treadmill desk during the 2018 Arab Health event.

== Safety and usage specifications ==
The recommended speed for walking on a treadmill while working at a computer is less than 2 miles per hour. To prevent injury, treadmill desks require compliance with the same ergonomic safety standards recommended for any computer desk, including placement such that the user's wrists are flat by the keyboard, their elbows form a 90-degree angle when typing, and their eyes may look forward to the monitor.

Treadmill desks are equipped with safety features to minimize the possibility for injury. A safety key attaches the console to an article of clothing on the user. The key can be pulled at any time to immediately stop the treadmill belt. Many treadmill desks are programmed to pause the belt if the user steps off for more than 20 seconds during a workout. A movement indicator is typically printed on the belt of the treadmill to show belt movement.

Users who tested treadmill desks reported advice to retain a traditional desk with a seat and to alternate between sitting and walking at different desks while becoming accustomed to the treadmill desk. Additionally, reading email and surfing the Internet were found to be easier to manage than learning to type or write while standing and walking. Talking on the phone while walking can be disruptive in some cases either because of changing the breathing rate of the user or because of the noise from the treadmill itself.

A treadmill desk is not intended to provide aerobic exercise, but rather to keep the user's metabolism over the basal metabolic rate.

== Benefits of behavior modifications ==
According to a study by James Levine at the Mayo Clinic, users can burn an estimated 100–130 calories per hour at speeds slower than 2 miles per hour. According to a 2007 Mayo Clinic study of office workers with obesity, "If sitting computer-time were replaced by walking-and-working, energy expenditure could increase by 100 cal/h. Thus, if obese individuals were to replace time spent sitting at the computer with walking computer time by 2–3 h/day, [...] a weight loss of 20–30 kg/year could occur." However, when Levine and associates actually conducted a 12-month trial in 2013, findings showed that subjects lost an average of 1.4 ± 3.3 kg (3 ± 7.2 lbs), with a higher rate of weight loss among obese subjects at 2.3 ± 3.5 kg ( 5 ± 7.7 lbs). It is not clear if treadmill desks are an effective intervention to reduce sitting. Prolonged sitting is linked to an "increased risk of heart disease, obesity, diabetes, cancer, and even early death."

A study published in the open-access journal PLOS ONE found that usage of a treadmill desk had a modest negative effect on the ability to recall sequences of numbers, indicating a possible effect on memory. However, the study noted its small sample size (75) and the possibility of an adjustment period as limitations, and the researchers suggested that treadmill desks have considerable benefits as long as the possible, possibly short-term effects on memory are taken into account.

However, another study conducted by James Levine found that computer task performance was lower while walking on a treadmill desk in comparison to standard chair sitting. Specifically, mouse performances were affected with a 14% decrease in mouse pointing speed and 106% increase in mouse error rate. Mouse accuracy and speed were affected more than typing performance.

A systematic review and meta-analysis of treadmill desks on energy expenditure, sitting time and cardiometabolic health in adults. The review took thirteen relevant studies with a total 351 participants. The results of the analysis showed a significant increase in energy expenditure (105.23 kcal per hour, 95% confidence interval [CI]: 90.41 to 120.4), and metabolic rate (5.0 mL/kg/min, 95% CI: 3.35 to 6.64) to treadmill users when comparing to sitting conditions. Additionally, there was a significant reduction in sitting time over a day period when comparing treadmill desks users vs. conventional desk (− 1.73 min per hour, 95% CI: − 3.3 to − 0.17). However, further studies must be conducted to show evidence of significant changes on cardiometabolic health.

== Styles and costs ==
There are several types of treadmill desks available on the open market. Treadmill desks fall into three categories:

- desks designed to cover a traditional treadmill
- treadmills designed to fit under a standing desk
- desks fabricated on top of a treadmill by original equipment manufacturer (OEM).

In 2013 in the United States a product testing organization tested treadmills priced at $750 and $1500, and recommended that consumers purchase models with safety and personalization features appropriate for the individual users. Various guides to building a treadmill desk are available.
