= Yuku =

Hosted internet forum

- Website type: Hosted Internet forums
- Owner: Tapatalk
- Creator: ezboard
- Website: www.yuku.com
- Commercial: Yes
- Registration: Required
- Launched: September 2005; 21 years ago (alpha); September 2006 (beta); January 2008 (public release)

Yuku was an upgraded version of ezboard, Inc.'s internet forums. Yuku described itself as "Message Boards 2.0". This tagline was most likely derived from the Web 2.0 features of Yuku message boards, such as tags and RSS.

Yuku ceased to exist as a separate entity in 2017, following an acquisition by Tapatalk and subsequent migration to the Tapatalk platform.

== History ==
Yuku was first revealed at DEMOfall 2005 in September 2005, at which time it was in alpha.

At the DEMOfall launch, Robert Labatt (CEO of ezboard, Inc.) explained that advertising revenues would be shared with the individual board owners. Labatt estimated that "an average large community" could receive $3,000 to $5,000 (speculated) a month. The launch was reported by media outlets such as Computerworld, USA Today, Bloomberg and CNN Money.

More demos were given at the New York City BlogOn 2005 event where it was selected as a "BlogOn 2005 Social Media Innovator". Another demonstration was given in November 2006 at a monthly technology networking event in San Francisco: SFWIN 1.10. Instead of the revenue feature mentioned at DEMOfall 2005, only combining message boards and blogs with multiple profiles per person were discussed.

Yuku was acquired by KickApps on February 13, 2008, and later sold to Inform Technologies Inc. on December 24, 2010.

On September 8, 2011, Crowdgather, Inc. publicly announced acquiring the domain name, website and assets related to yuku.com including the ezboard domains and its integrated forums. Then in 2016, Yuku was acquired by Tapatalk, which migrated the contents of all its boards to their own platform in July 2017 and switched from a forum to a group style of format.

== Pricing ==
As with ezboard, free Yuku boards are supported through advertisements.

== Features ==
Some of the key features of Yuku are listed below.

=== Profiles, message boards and blogs ===
Yuku's user profiles are interactive and similar to those at other Social Networking web sites. Friends can be added or removed, comments can be posted, and private messages exchanged between users. Each account offers the possibility of having five profiles.

Profiles, message boards and blogs can be personalized via pre-made themes in the skins library, or custom-built using HTML and CSS. The Mini Profile provides basic user information, e.g. name, location, age etc. The rest of the profile comprises blocks that can be turned on, moved up and down, or removed.

The available blocks include a location block, which displays the location of the user's ISP using Google Maps; favorite links; media; blog; tags; friends; recent posts; comments; and empty blocks, which can be customised using HTML.

=== Image hosting ===
Each user gets 30MB of free image hosting, with 100MB of image hosting available for paid accounts. The profiles offer members image galleries with slideshows.

=== Points ===
Kudos was changed to points in September 2010. Points, earlier called kudos, forms the basis of a simple reputation system. User-based points is accumulated across Yuku - it is not specific to individual boards. Topic-based points allows users to give positive ratings to good topics. This also gives a small fraction of points to the user who started the topic.

The Yuku Hall of Fame shows the top 100 profiles on Yuku, ordered by points.

=== Tags ===
Tags are search terms that can be added to topics. Tags make it easier to find topics on certain subjects. They are an alternate way to search for information, as they will only show topics if the word you are looking for was used as a tag.

=== Feature voting ===
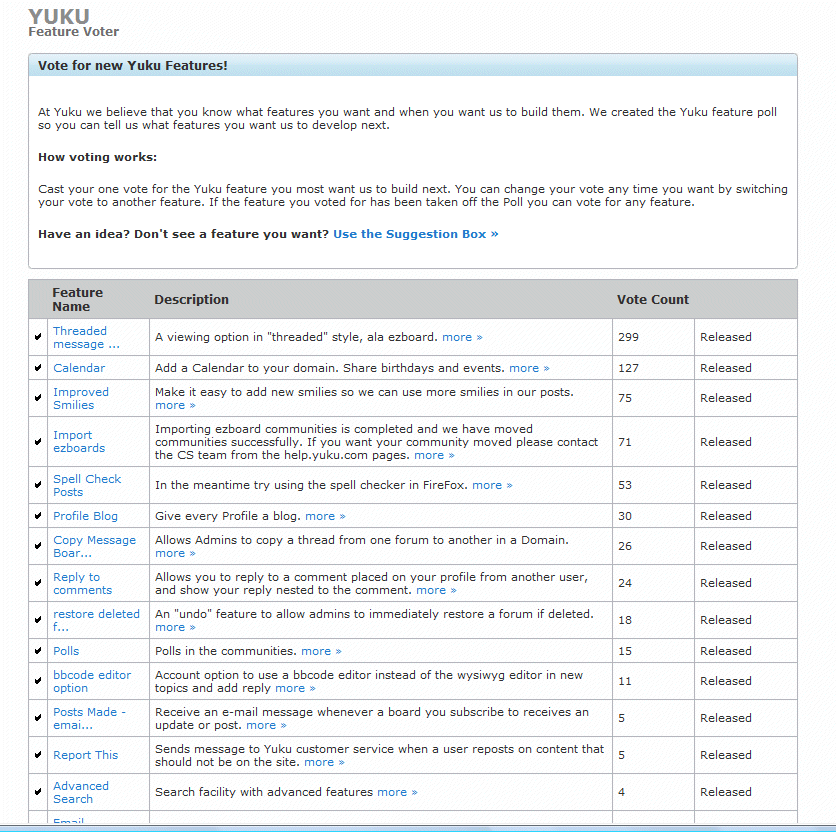
Feature Voting, Yuku.com

The Feature Voter allows users to vote on which features will be developed in the future. Photobucket integration is an example of a feature that was developed ahead of other features based on user feedback.

== Technology ==
Server-side processing is handled via PHP. On the client-side, Yuku makes heavy use of Ajax. With JavaScript disabled, Yuku is still functional, but some features are simplified. For example, rather than a WYSIWYG posting editor, non-javascript users are presented with a simple text area instead. As some menus are hidden using JavaScript, these are displayed in full.
