= Gossip bench =

Item of furniture

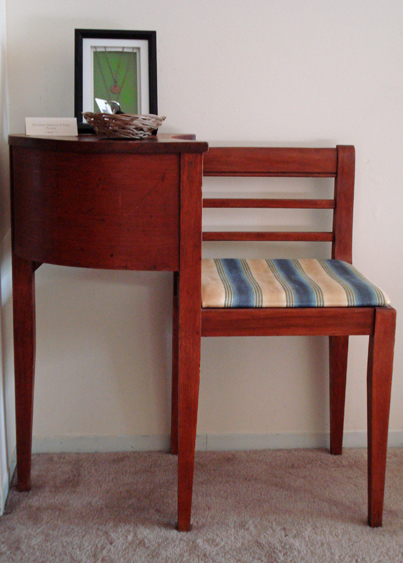
A telephone table

A gossip bench or telephone table is a piece of furniture that combines a chair with an attached side table on one end, sometimes with built-in storage such as one or more drawers or shelves, or a magazine rack.

The furniture became popular shortly after the telephone was invented in 1876. They were most popular between the 1930s and the 1950s, but have no specific date of invention, as they developed over time as a matter of convenience and necessity.

The gossip bench began as a shelf for the telephone (then a very large and cumbersome non-portable object) to rest upon, usually in the hallway of the home. Naturally, telephone users began sitting on a chair while using the telephone. Soon, the two (shelf and chair) were combined into one stylish piece of furniture by opportunistic furniture craftsmen everywhere. A lamp and the telephone would typically be placed on the table top of the gossip bench, while a telephone directory would be stored in the drawer underneath.

As with other types of furniture, different regions produced different types of gossip bench. Scandinavian influence produced more sleek styles, while those in Great Britain were more ornate.

== See also ==
- Telephone desk
