= Standing frame =

Wheelchair alternative for standing

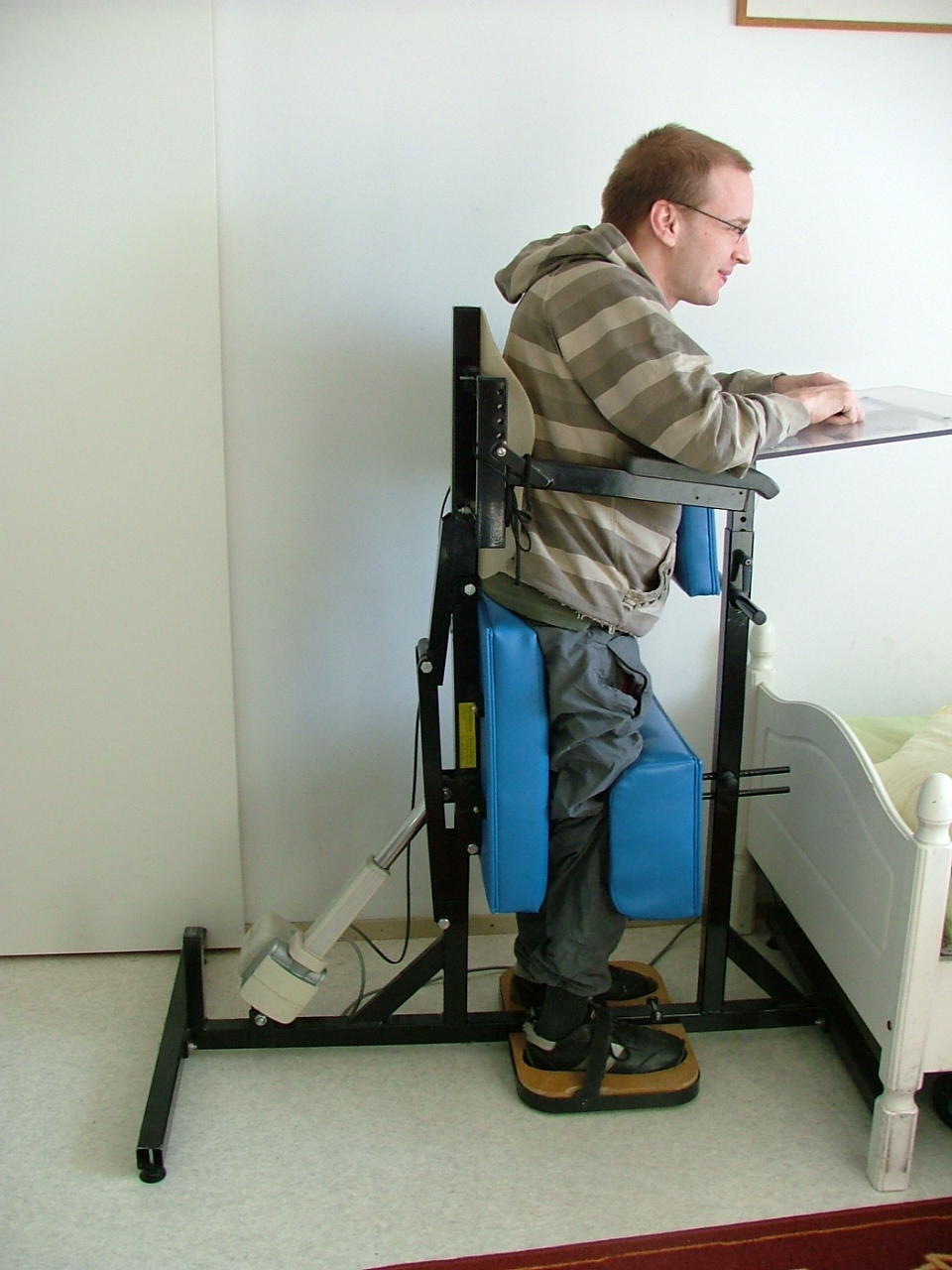
Sit to stand stander

A standing frame (also known as a stand, stander, standing technology, standing aid, standing device, standing box, tilt table) is assistive technology that can be used by a person who relies on a wheelchair for mobility. A standing frame provides alternative positioning to sitting in a wheelchair by supporting the person in the standing position.

== Types and function ==
Common types of standers include: sit to stand, prone, supine, upright, multi-positioning standers, and standing wheelchairs. Long leg braces are also a standing device but not used often today.

=== Categories of standers ===
==== By mobility ====
- Passive (static) stander: A passive stander remains in one place. They sometimes have casters, but cannot be self-propelled.
- Mobile (dynamic) stander: User can self-propel a mobile stander if they have the strength to push a manual wheelchair. Some standers are also available with powered mobility.
- Active stander: An active stander creates reciprocal movement of the arms legs while standing.

==== By type ====
- Prone: Prone standers distribute the body weight to the front of the individual and usually have a tray in front of them. This makes them good for users who are actively trying to carry out some task.
- Supine: Supine standers distribute the body weight to the back and are good for cases where the user has more limited mobility or is recovering from injury.
- Sit-to-Stand: Sit-to-Stand devices are used to enable people in wheelchairs to stand without requiring other people to lift them in. This is more commonly used by adults than children because children are generally light enough for one person to lift them.

== Diagnoses and users ==
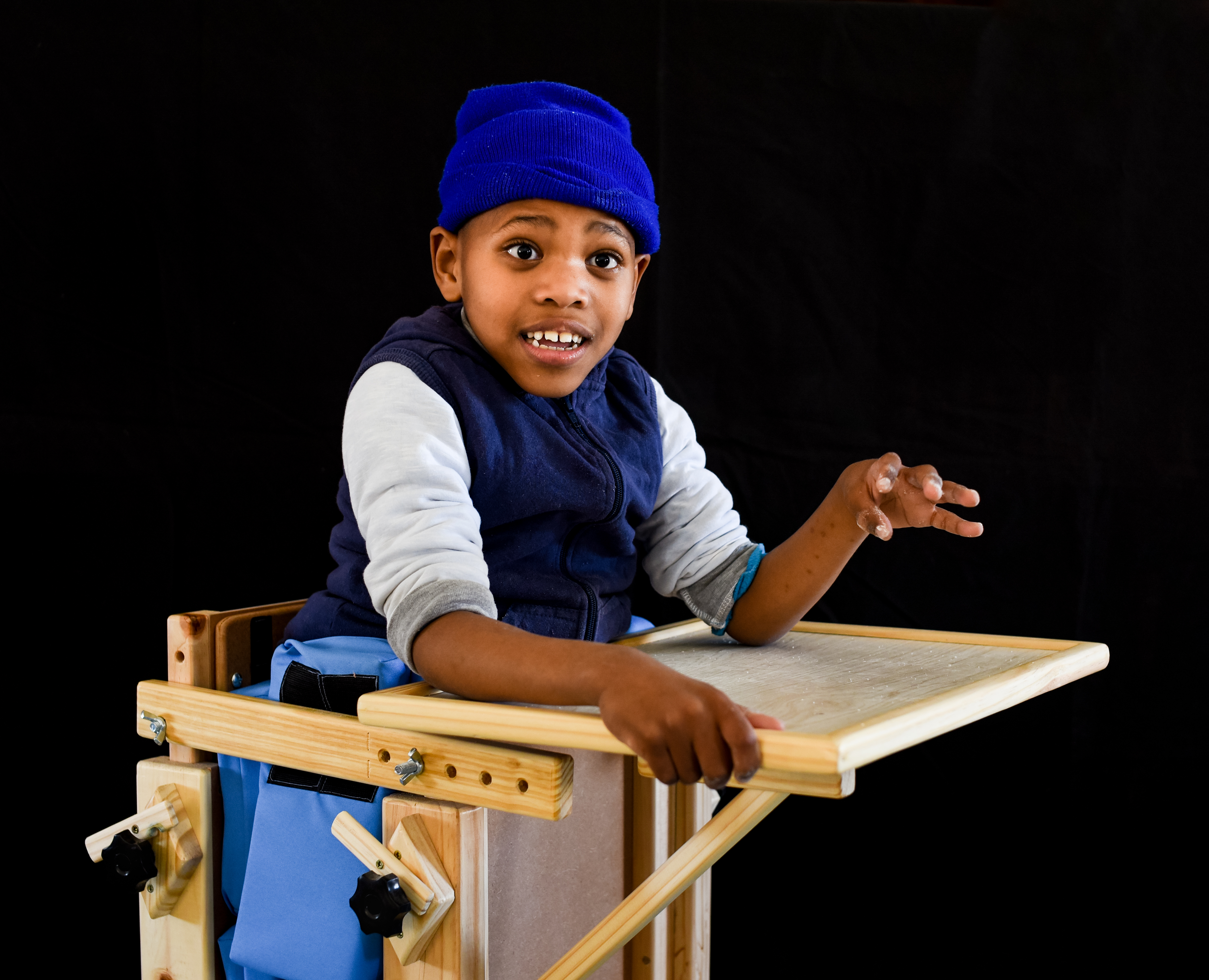
Boy with cerebral palsy using a wooden standing frame in South Africa

Standers are used by people with mild to severe disabilities such as spinal cord injury, traumatic brain injury, cerebral palsy, spina bifida, muscular dystrophy, multiple sclerosis, stroke, Rett syndrome, and post-polio syndrome.

=== Spinal cord injury ===
Standers are used by people with both paraplegia and quadriplegia since a variety of support options are available to accommodate for mild to severe disabilities. Doug Betters and Mike Utley are both former NFL football players who are quadriplegics due to spinal cord injury. They both stand using active standers.

Bone mineral loss and osteoporosis are common consequences after spinal cord injury. Therapeutic standing, a weight-bearing intervention that can be applied using a standing frame, has traditionally been incorporated into rehabilitation programs for those with chronic spinal cord injury in order to prevent osteoporosis. A systematic review of the literature conducted by Biering-Sorenson et al. (2009) shows that therapeutic standing in the chronic phase of injury, defined as one year after injury, has no effect on maintaining bone density. Results on the effectiveness of therapeutic standing during the first year of injury are conflicting and show that shorter, less aggressive intervention is less effective. If therapeutic standing is to be incorporated into treatment, it should be more aggressive and initiated in the early stages of injury if any beneficial impacts on bone mineral density are hoped to be achieved.

== Common settings and applications ==
Standing devices are used in a variety of settings including:

- In the home and workplace,
- Early intervention centers,
- Schools (special education classes or the inclusive classroom), adapted physical education classes,
- Children's hospitals and therapy centers,
- Rehabilitation facilities and hospitals,
- Extended care units, nursing homes, assisted living centers and group homes, and veterans' hospitals.

== Obtaining a standing frame ==
Funding (government funding or health insurance) for standing equipment is achievable in most developed countries, but usually requires medical justification and a letter of medical necessity (a detailed medical prescription) written by a physical therapist or medical professional.

== Sources ==
- Able data factsheet on standing aids
- Holland D, Holland T (March 2006). "Taking a stand". Rehab Manag. 19 (2): 44–9. PMID 16538962.
