= Sitting =

Resting position of human body

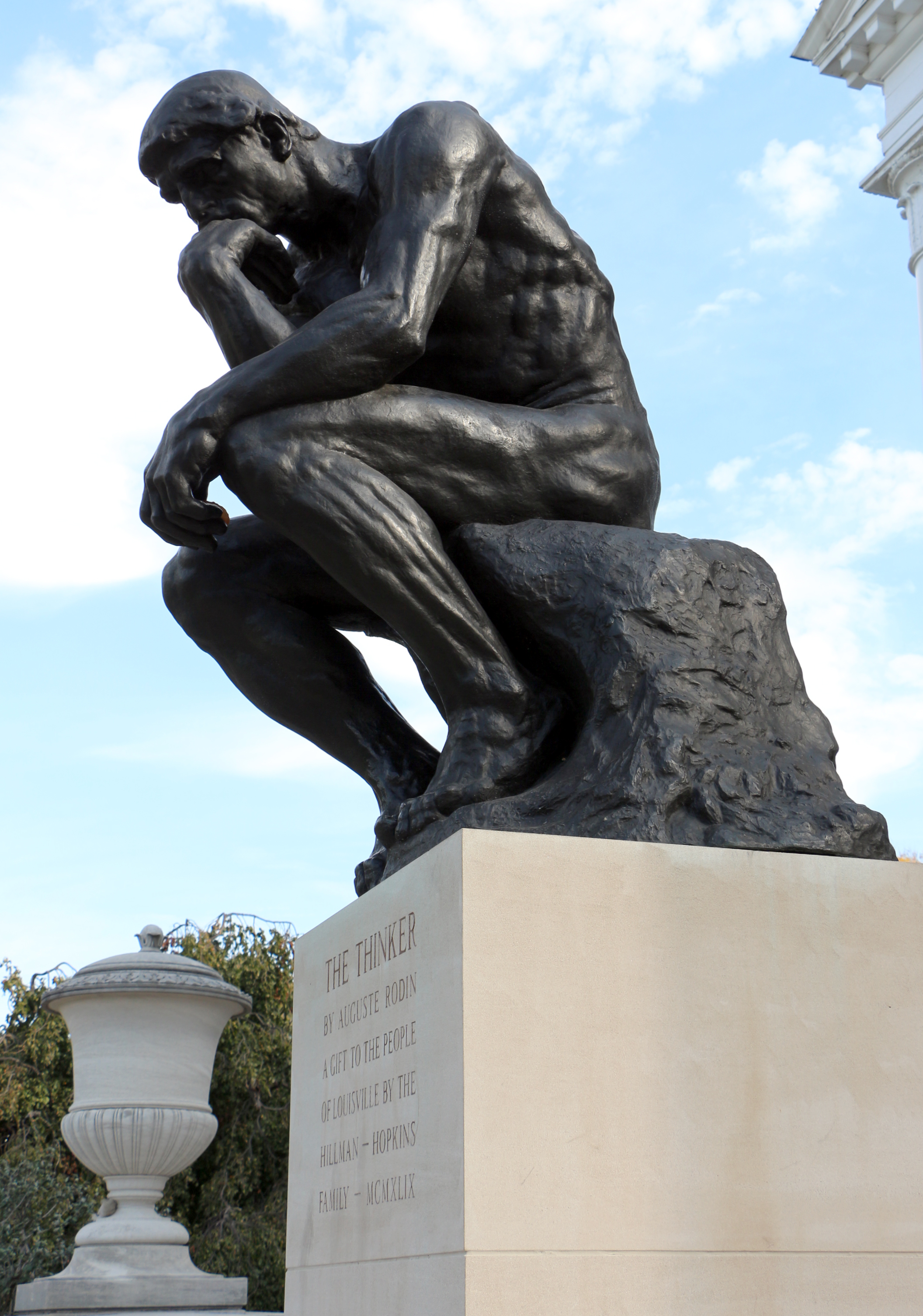
The Thinker by Auguste Rodin

Sitting is a basic action and resting position in which the body weight is supported primarily by the bony ischial tuberosities with the buttocks in contact with the ground or a horizontal surface such as a chair seat, instead of by the lower limbs as in standing, squatting or kneeling. When sitting, the torso is more or less upright, although sometimes it can lean against other objects for a more relaxed posture.

Sitting for much of the day may pose significant health risks, with one study suggesting people who sit regularly for prolonged periods may have higher mortality rates than those who do not. The average person sits down for 4.7 hours per day, according to a global review representing 47% of the global adult population.

The form of kneeling where the buttocks sit back on the heels, for example as in the seiza and Vajrasana postures, is also often interpreted as sitting.

== Prevalence ==
The British Chiropractic Association said in 2006 that 32% of the British population spent more than ten hours per day sitting down.

== Positions ==
=== On the floor ===
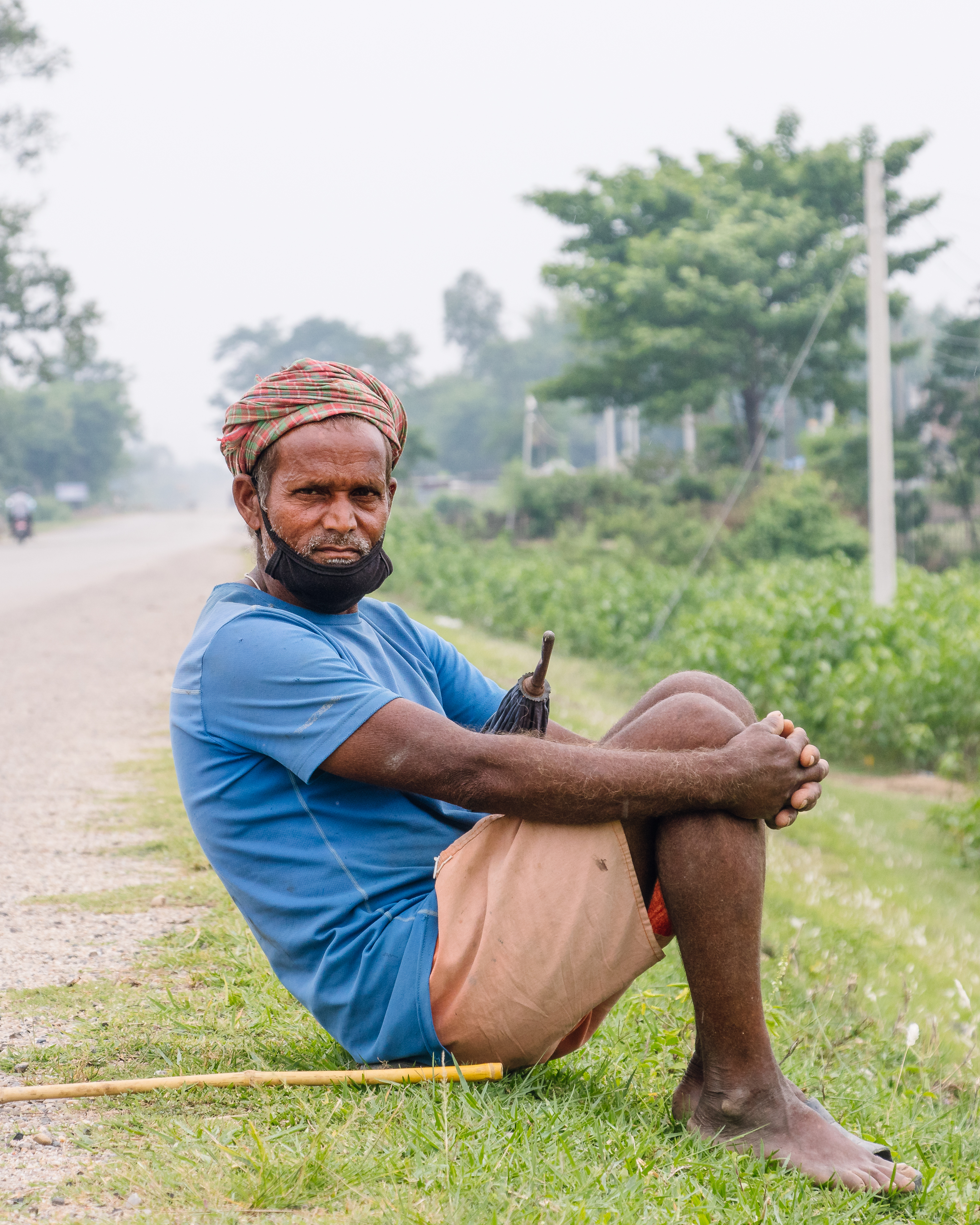
A man sitting on the ground, on a road in Nepal

The most common ways of sitting on the floor involve bending the knees. One can also sit with the legs unbent, using something solid as support for the back or leaning on one's arms. Sitting with bent legs can be done with the legs mostly parallel or by crossing them over each other.

A common cross-legged position is with the lower part of both legs folded towards the body, crossing each other at the ankle or calf, with both ankles on the floor, sometimes with the feet tucked under the knees or thighs. The position is known in several European languages as tailor's posture, from the traditional working posture of tailors. It is also named after various plains-dwelling nomads: in American English Indian style, in many European languages "Turkish style", and in Japanese agura (胡座; the sitting style of non-Han ethnics (Note: Particularly Turks, Mongols and other Central Asians.)). In yoga it is known as sukhasana, meaning "easy pose".

=== On a raised seat ===
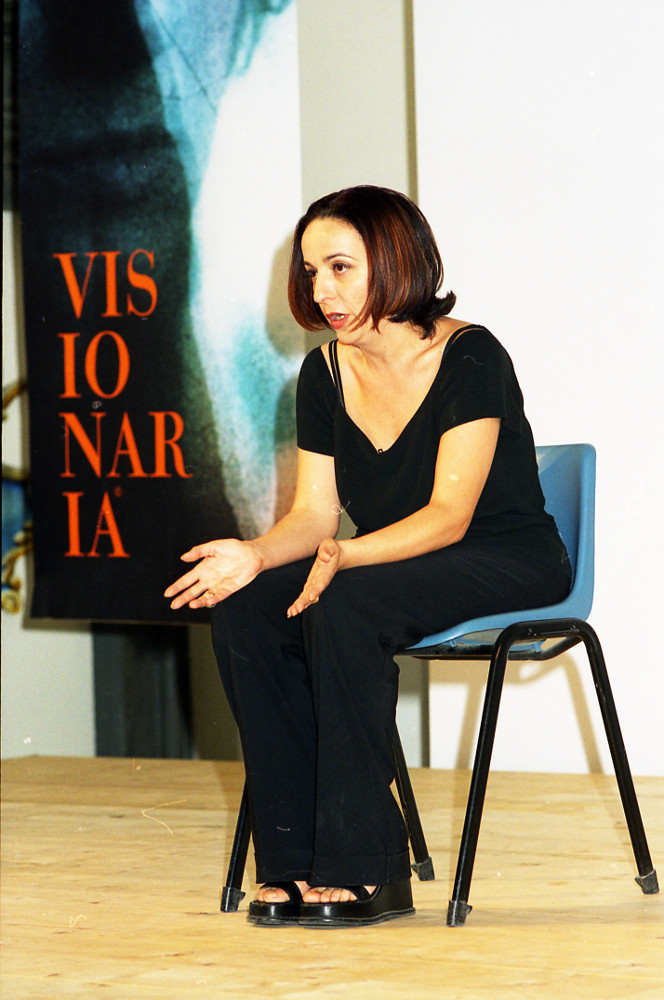
A woman sitting on a chair

Various raised surfaces at the appropriate height can be used as seats for humans, whether they are made for the purpose, such as chairs, stools and benches, or not. While the buttocks are nearly always rested on the raised surface, there are many differences in how one can hold one's legs and back.

There are two major styles of sitting on a raised surface. The first has one or two of the legs in front of the sitting person; in the second, sitting astride something, the legs incline outwards on either side of the body.

The feet can rest on the floor or on a footrest, which can keep them vertical, horizontal, or at an angle in between. They can also dangle if the seat is sufficiently high. Legs can be kept right to the front of the body, spread apart, or one crossed over the other.

The upper body can be held upright, recline to either side or backward, or one can lean forward.

A young man in sporting clothes sitting cross-legged, 1907

=== Yoga, traditions and spirituality ===
There are many seated positions in various traditions and rituals. Four examples are:

- Zhengzuo (正座; zhèngzuò) is a Chinese word which describes the traditional formal way of sitting in Ancient China. A related position is guizuo (跪座; guìzuò), which differs in the tops of the feet being raised off the ground.
- Vajrasana (Diamond Pose) is a yoga posture (asana) similar to seiza.
- The lotus position involves resting each foot on the opposite thigh so that the soles of the feet face upwards.
- The Burmese position, named so because of its use in Buddhist sculptures in Burma, places both feet in front of the pelvis with knees bent and touching the floor to the sides. The heels are pointing toward pelvis or upward, and toes are pointed so that the tops of the feet lie on the ground. This looks similar to the cross-legged position, but the feet are not placed underneath the thigh of the next leg, therefore the legs do not cross. Instead, one foot is placed in front of the other.

In various mythologies and folk magic, sitting is a magical act that connects the person who sits with other persons, states or places.

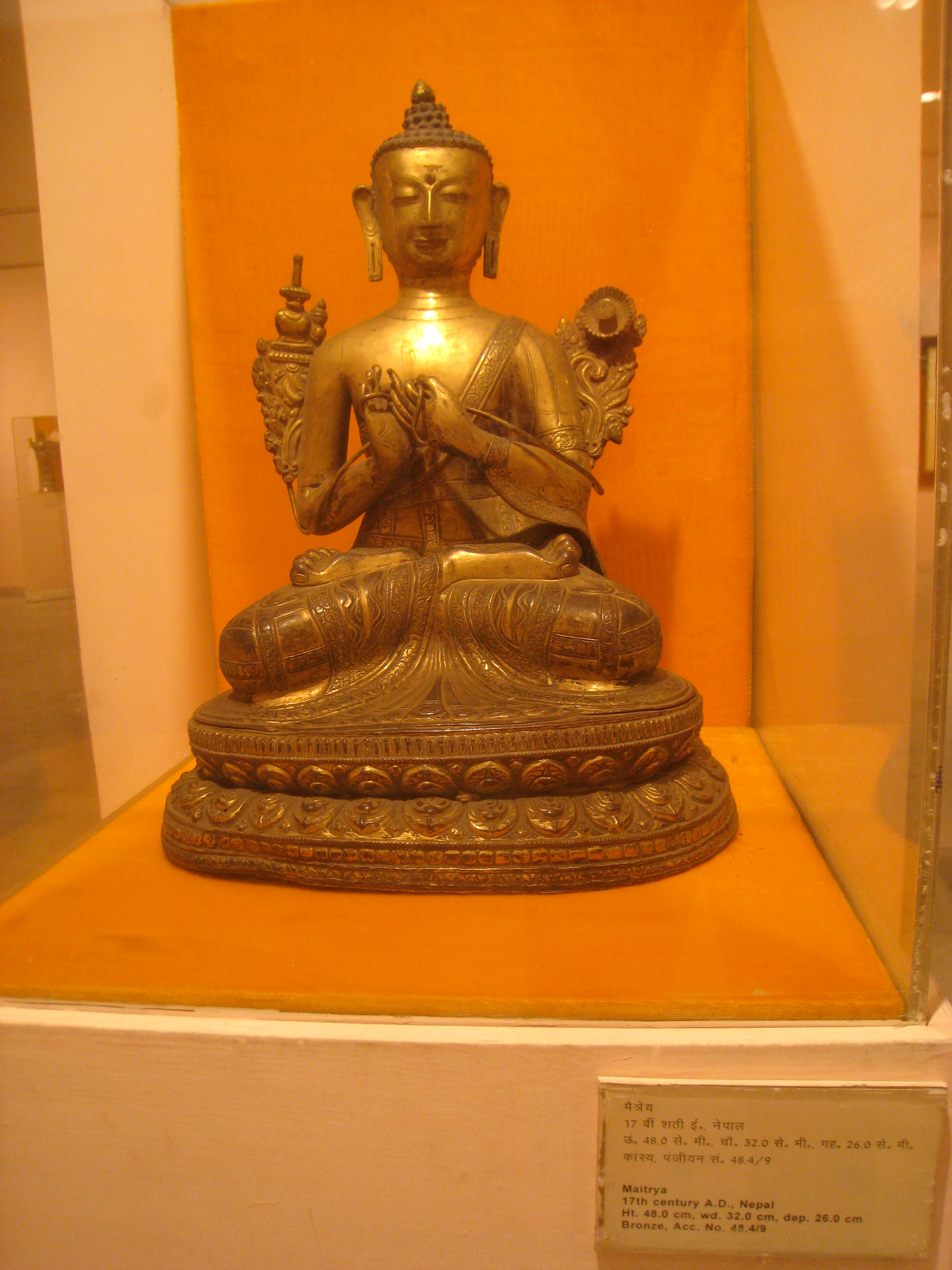
An Indian Buddha, seated with legs crossed

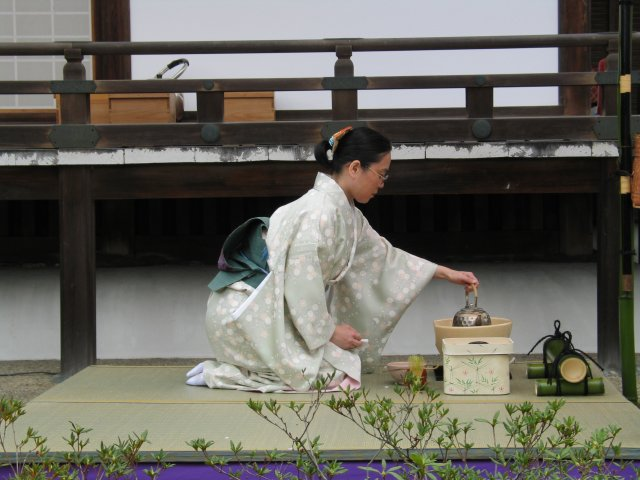
The Japanese tea ceremony is performed sitting in seiza.

=== Kneeling chairs ===
The kneeling chair (often just referred to as "ergonomic chair") was designed to motivate better posture than the conventional chair. To sit in a kneeling chair, one rests one's buttocks on the upper sloping pad and rests the front of the lower legs atop the lower pad, i.e., the human position as both sitting and kneeling at the same time.

== Health risks ==
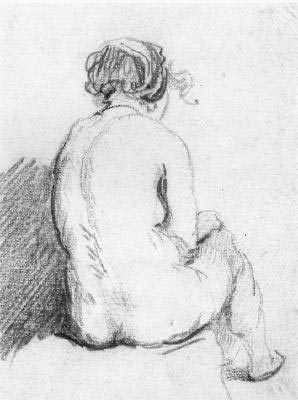
Back of a sitting nude by school of Rembrandt

In 1700, De Morbis Artificum Diatriba listed sitting in odd postures as a cause of diseases in "chair-workers". Current studies indicate there is a significantly higher mortality rate among people who regularly sit for prolonged periods, and the risk is not negated by regular exercise, though it is lowered. The causes of mortality and morbidity include heart disease, obesity, type 2 diabetes and cancer, specifically, breast, endometrial, colorectal, lung, and epithelial ovarian cancer. The link between heart disease and diabetes mortality and sitting is well-established, but the risk of cancer mortality is unclear. Sedentary time is also associated with an increased risk of depression in children and adolescents. A correlation between occupational sitting specifically and higher body mass index has been demonstrated, but causality has not yet been established. There are several hypotheses explaining why sitting is a health risk. These include changes in cardiac output, vitamin D, inflammation, sex hormone activity, lipoprotein lipase activity, and GLUT4 activity due to long periods of muscular unloading, among others.

Sitting may occupy up to half of an adult's workday in developed countries. Workplace programs to reduce sitting vary in method. They include sit-stand desks, counseling, workplace policy changes, walking or standing meetings, treadmill desks, breaks, therapy ball chairs, and stepping devices. Results of these programs are mixed, but there is moderate evidence to show that changes to chairs (adjusting the biomechanics of the chair or using different types of chairs) can effectively reduce musculoskeletal symptoms in workers who sit for most of their day.

Public health programs typically focus on increasing physical activity rather than reducing sitting time. One major target for these public health programs is sitting in the workplace. For example, WHO Europe recommended in September 2015 the provision of adjustable desks in the workplace. In general, there is conflicting evidence regarding the precise risks of sitting for long periods. A 2018 Cochrane review found low-quality evidence that providing employees with a standing desk option may reduce the length of time some people sit at work in the first year. This reduction in sitting may decrease with time, and there is no evidence that standing desks are effective in the long term. In addition, a 2018 British Journal of Medicine systematic review concluded that interventions aimed at reducing sitting outside of work were only modestly effective. It is not clear how standing desks compare to other work-place interventions to reduce the length of time employees are sitting during the work day.

=== Relationship between posture and health conditions ===
Though most studies even until early 21st century relate human body postures to various musculoskeletal conditions, recent researches show no potential causal relationship between postures and these conditions like back pain; other causes like sleep deprivation, stress and long-term physical inactivity or prolonged static unnatural postural stress could be significant confounders for various health conditions. However some research show that prolonged slouched position may be a cause for minor breathing disorders. Though still a large proportion of the clinical practitioners attribute absence of a neutral spine posture as one of the main causes of conditions like back pain and neck pain, the relationship is not thoroughly established. It is also thought that much of so-called "poor posture" is actually just postural stress and being stuck with bad ergonomics that could be causing the pain, and not really a postural problem. iHunch is an example of postural stress which could cause upper back pain and neck pain, which is prevalent in younger generations and people whose occupation involves prolonged usage of computers. The concept of "good posture" has led to a common misconception that sitting in one good sitting position will allay the negative effects of sitting.

=== Sedentary behaviour ===
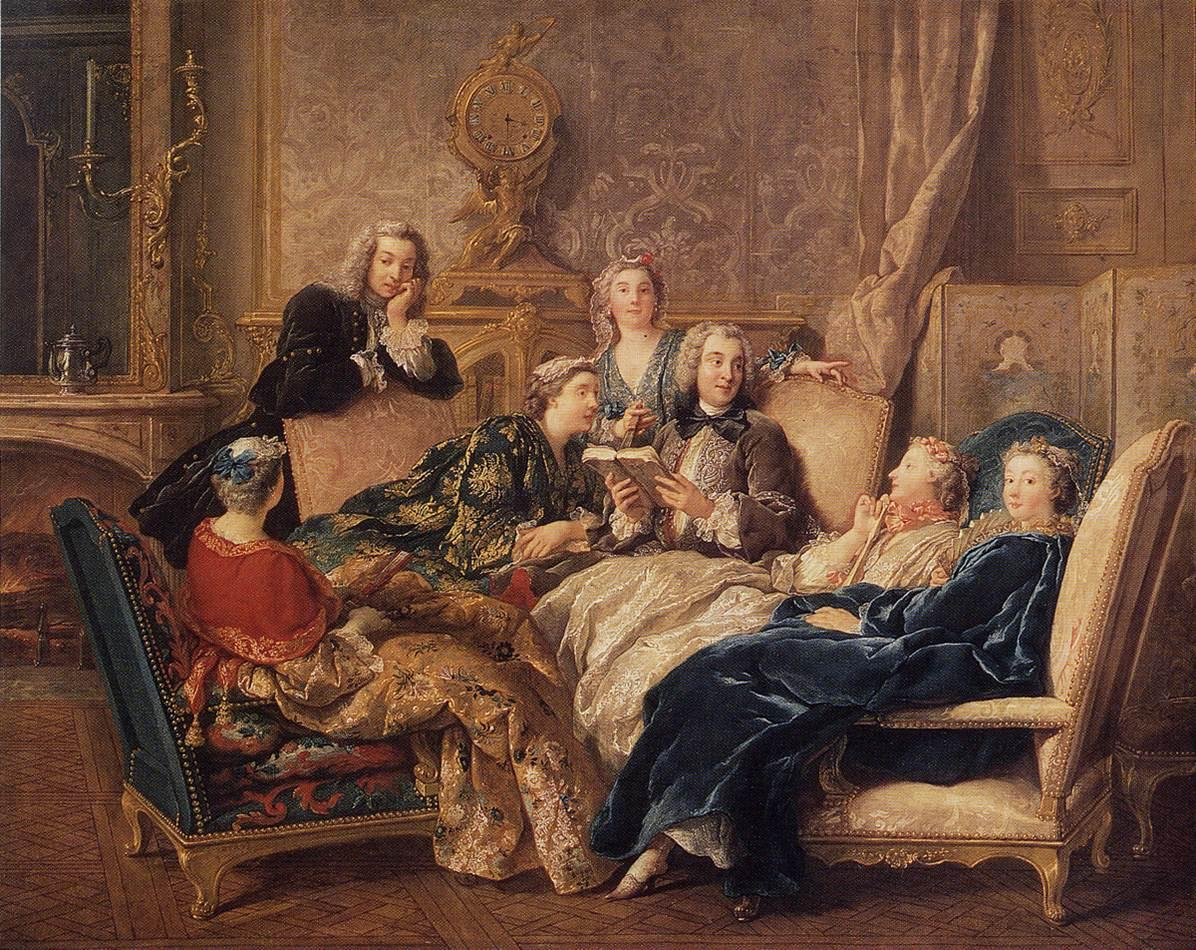
Women reclining in chairs. Painting by Jean-François de Troy.

Sedentary behaviour is any waking behaviour, whether in sitting or reclining posture, by an energy expenditure less than or equal to 1.5 metabolic equivalents of task (METs). MET, beside the watt and kilojoules, is the unit for expressing the energy cost of physical activities. One MET is defined as resting metabolic rate – as energy used with a person at rest, sitting quietly in a chair or as the amount of oxygen (O_{2}) consumed with that person. MET for an adult weighing 70 kg equals 3.5 ml O_{2} per kg body weight per min.

Sedentary behaviour should be distinguished from being inactive – performing insufficient amounts of MVPA (moderate to vigorous physical activity). The World Health Organization recommends at least 60 min of daily MVPA for children and adolescents aged 5–17 years, and 150 min of weekly MVPA for adults.

Sedentary behaviour can not be equated with screen time, although some researchers found out that a large share of waking time by children and adolescents in a sedentary position is accumulated by media consumption in front of a screen.

== See also ==
- Baddha Koṇāsana
- Bharadvajasana
- Coccydynia
- Right to sit
- Flandrin pose
- Siddhasana
- Sitting disability
- Sitting on one's haunches
