= Desk and bench =

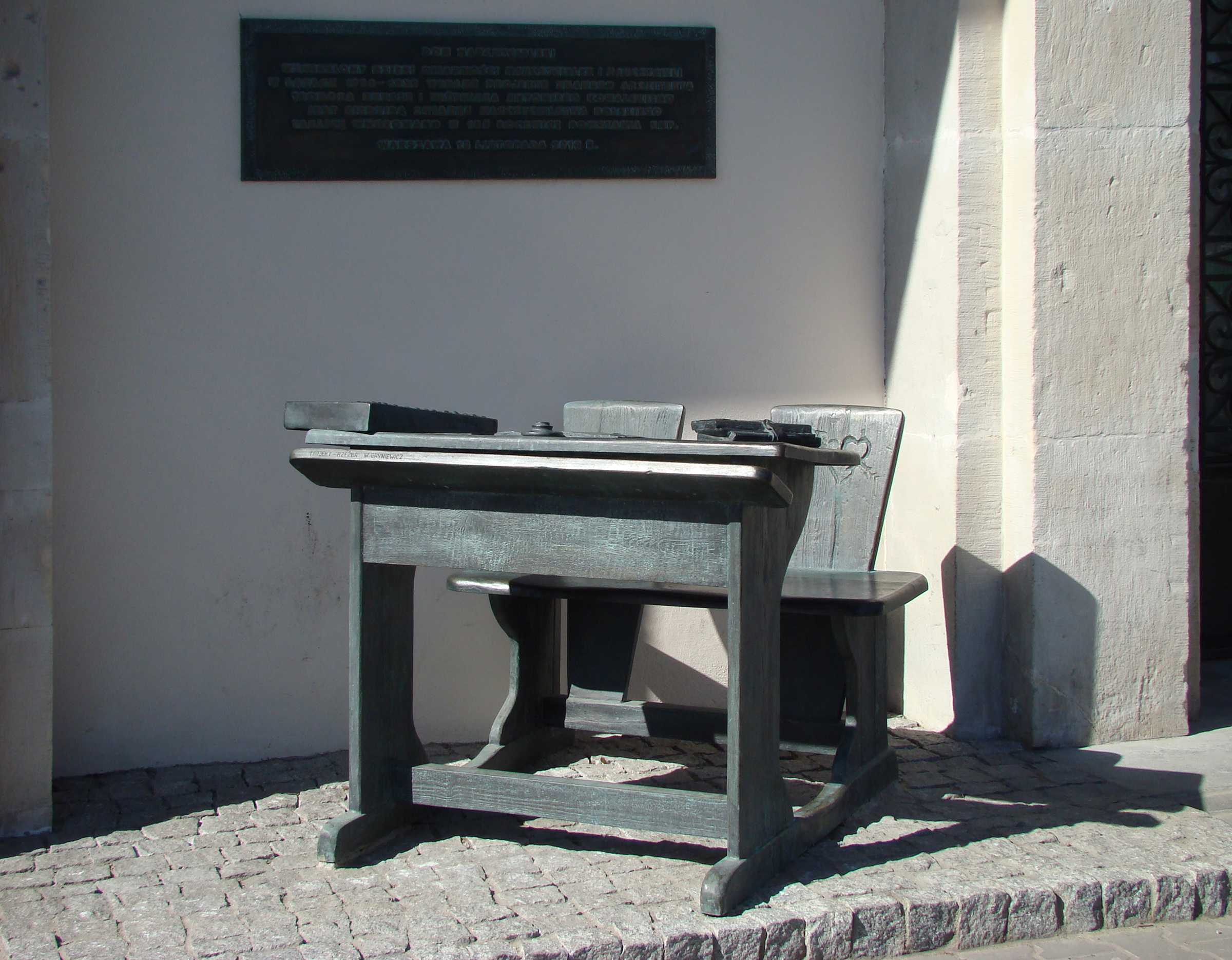
School desk and bench monument in Warsaw

A desk and bench can be an antique or a modern form of desk combined with a small bench or a stool made in exactly the same style and material. The desk is usually not very big and meant to be placed against a wall, in a little room or a hallway. Because of this intended venue and its small size it is in a sense a cousin to the telephone desk. In form it is in general a smaller brother of the writing table.

The term "desk and bench" is also sometimes used to describe a school desk which has a built-in seat. A "desk and bench" set is also sometimes called a "desk and stool".

The desk is usually built with a single drawer or none, and the bench can sometimes have a small storage space under its seat. Great attention is usually paid to the aesthetics of the set in order to enhance the matching features.

Since the stool or bench has no back, it is put away completely under the desk when not in use, maximizing even more the available space.

== See also ==
- List of desk forms and types
