= Seiza =

Japanese way of sitting

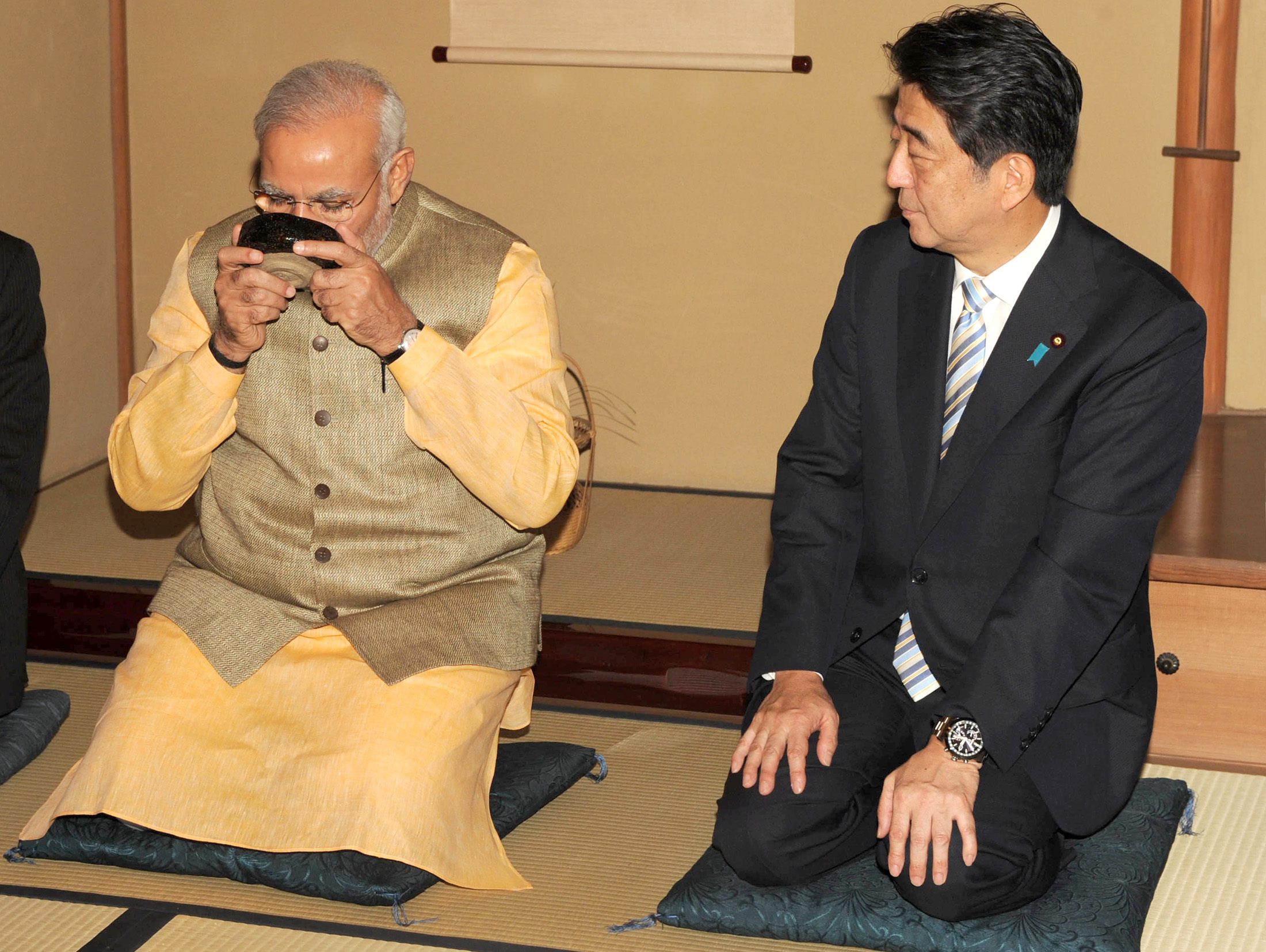
Narendra Modi (Prime Minister of India) and Shinzō Abe (then Prime Minister of Japan) sitting seiza-style during a tea ceremony at Akasaka Palace (2014)

Seiza (正座 or 正坐; せいざ SAY-zah; lit. 'proper sitting') is the formal, traditional way of sitting in Japan. It involves a specific positioning and posture in a kneeled position so as to convey respect, particularly toward elders. It developed among samurai during the Edo period and was later widely adopted by the public.

Seiza is associated with straw tatami flooring or zabuton pillows that allow for comfortable sitting, and it is commonly used in several Japanese practices, including Japanese martial arts and the Japanese tea ceremony. Sitting seiza-style is often difficult for people who are not accustomed to it or for the physically infirm, such as injured people and the elderly. Sitting seiza-style for long periods of time is associated with health problems, particularly those of the knees. Seiza may be compared to similar seated positions in other cultures, such as Indian Vajrasana.

== Form ==
To sit seiza-style, one must first be kneeling on the floor, folding one's legs underneath one's thighs, while resting the buttocks on the heels. The ankles are turned outward as the tops of the feet are lowered so that, in a slight "V" shape, the tops of the feet are flat on the floor and big toes overlapped, the right always on top of the left, and the buttocks are finally lowered all the way down. Depending on the circumstances, the hands are folded modestly in the lap, or are placed palm down on the upper thighs with the fingers close together, or are placed on the floor next to the hips, with the knuckles rounded and touching the floor. The back is kept straight, though not unnaturally stiff. Traditionally, women sit with the knees together while men separate them slightly. Some martial arts, notably kendō, aikidō, and iaidō, may prescribe up to two fist widths of distance between the knees for men.

Stepping into and out of seiza is performed mindfully. There are codified traditional methods of entering and exiting the sitting position depending on occasion and type of clothing worn.

== History ==
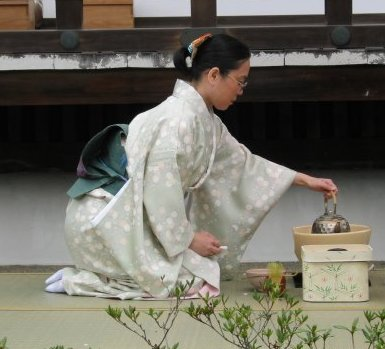
A woman in seiza performing a Japanese tea ceremony

Prior to the Edo period, there were no standard postures for sitting on the floor. During this time, seiza referred to "correct sitting", which took various forms such as sitting cross-legged (胡坐, agura), sitting with one knee raised (立て膝, tatehiza), or sitting to the side (割座, wariza), while the posture commonly known as seiza today was called kiza (危座).

People's social circumstances, clothing styles, and the places where they sat naturally brought about their manners of sitting. The development, in the Muromachi period, of Japanese architecture in which the floors were completely covered with tatami (thick straw mats), combined with the strict formalities of the ruling warrior class for which this style of architecture was principally designed, heralded the adoption of the sitting posture known today as seiza as the respectful way to sit. By the middle of the Edo period, it had become a convention for samurai to sit in this manner when meeting authority figures such as the Shogun as a symbol of obedience and loyalty. However, it probably was not until around the years surrounding the turn of the 18th century (the Genroku to Kyōhō eras in Japanese history) that the Japanese generally adopted this manner of sitting in their everyday lives and during the Meiji era, it had become firmly established as the proper sitting posture, as part of the "Japanese culture and tradition" purposefully created during this time.

The posture serves as the standard floor sitting posture for most traditional formal occasions, and it is generally considered the respectful way to sit in the presence of superiors or elders unless otherwise permitted. There is a similar sitting posture in India called vajrasana. It would be done during a form of yoga and practiced during visiting temples and doing prayer in temples. Indians believe that this posture has health benefits.

== Floor ==
Seiza involves sitting down on the floor and not on a chair. In traditional Japanese architecture, floors in various rooms designed for comfort have tatami floors. Seiza thus is closely connected with tatami flooring. There are circumstances, however, when people sit seiza-style on carpeted and hardwood floors. In many martial arts, for instance, this sitting position generally takes place on hardwood floors. Depending on the formality of the occasion, the setting, and the relative status of the person, it is sometimes acceptable to sit on a special cushion called a zabuton ("sitting futon").

== Difficulties ==
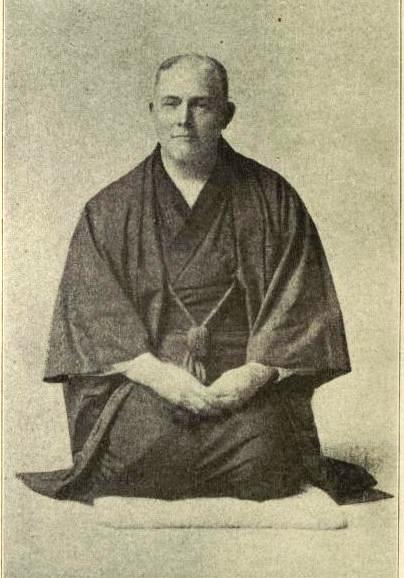
Frederick Starr sitting in the seiza style on a zabuton

Sometimes stools are provided for elderly or injured people even when others are expected to sit seiza-style. It is recommended, particularly in formal situations, to at least try to sit seiza-style. Non-Japanese who have not grown up sitting in this posture may, however, have difficulty assuming it at all. Those unfamiliar with seiza will likely find that maintaining it for more than a minute or two tends to lead to paresthesia, whereby the compression of the nerves causes a loss of their blood flow, with the accompanying "pins and needles" feeling, followed by painful burning sensations, and then eventually complete numbness in the legs. However, the physical discomfort lessens with experience as the circulation of the blood improves. Experienced seiza practitioners can maintain the posture for forty minutes or more with minimal discomfort. Certain knee problems are made worse when assuming this position, specifically Osgood-Schlatter disease.

Special seiza stools are available in Japan. They are folding stools, small enough to be carried in a handbag, which are placed between the feet and on which one rests the buttocks when sitting seiza-style. They allow one to maintain the appearance of sitting seiza while discreetly taking pressure off the heels and feet.

A law that came into effect in April 2020 recognizes seiza for extended periods of time as a morally unacceptable form of punishment according to Japan's Ministry of Health, Labour and Welfare.

== Use in traditional arts ==
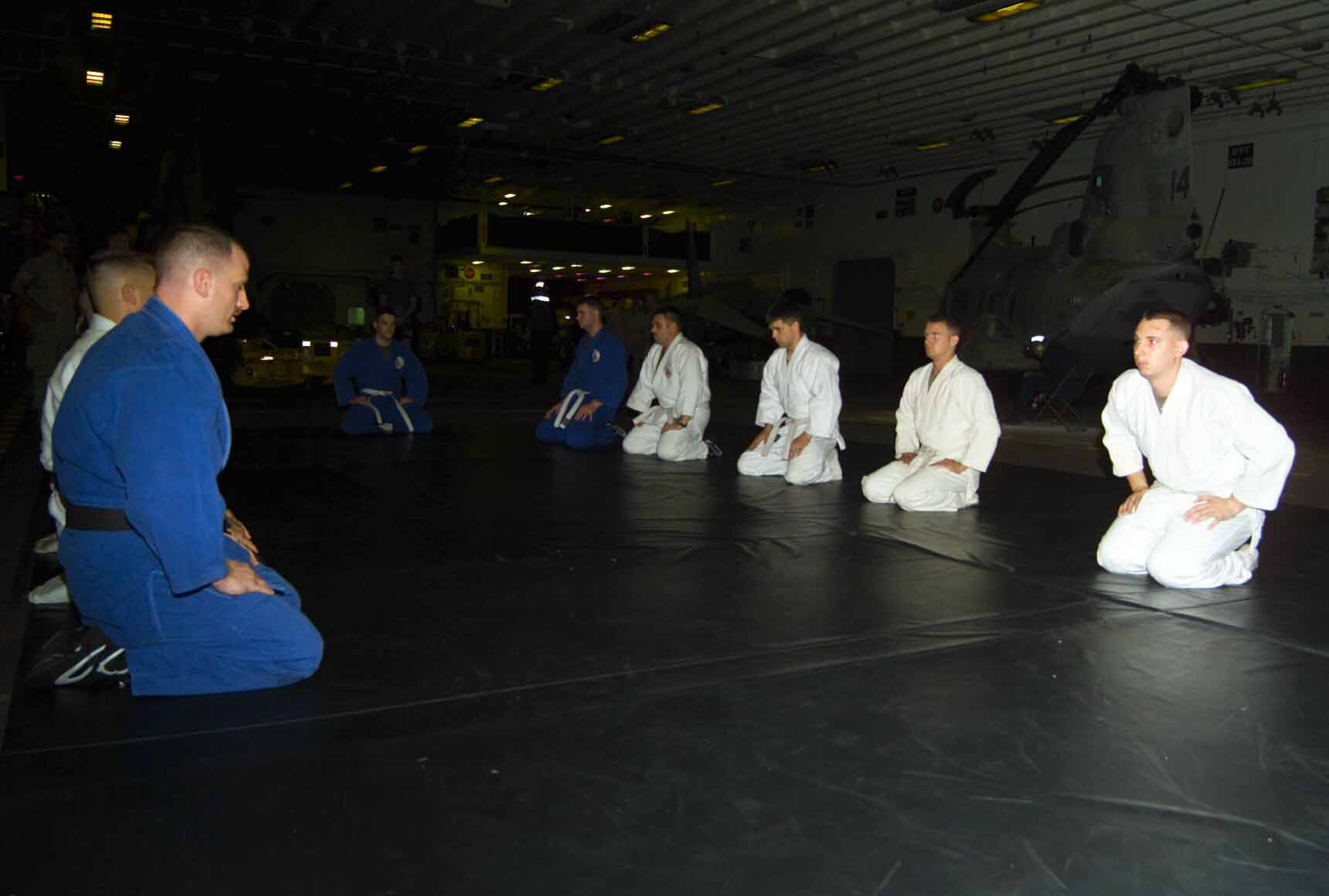
The judo practitioner at right performs a bow while seated in seiza

Doing seiza is an integral and required part of several traditional Japanese arts, such as certain Japanese martial arts and tea ceremony (a table-style version of tea ceremony known as ryūrei was invented in the 19th century). Seiza is also the traditional way of sitting while doing other arts such as shodō (calligraphy) and ikebana (flower arranging), though with the increasing use of western-style furniture it is not always necessary nowadays.

Many theatres for traditional performing arts such as kabuki and sumo still have audience seating sections where the spectators sit in seiza style.

=== Shikkō ===
Walking on the feet and knees while in the seiza posture, known as shikkō (膝行; knee-movement), is considered more polite than standing up and walking regularly. Shikkō is today quite rare, but is found in some traditional formal restaurants and ryokan, and is practiced in the martial art of aikido, where practitioners learn to defend themselves while moving in shikkō.

To perform this knee-walking movement correctly the heels must be kept close together, and the body must move as a whole unit. Movement in shikkō forces one to engage the hips in a way that is considered valuable for aikido training.

== Alternative sitting positions ==
=== Agura ===
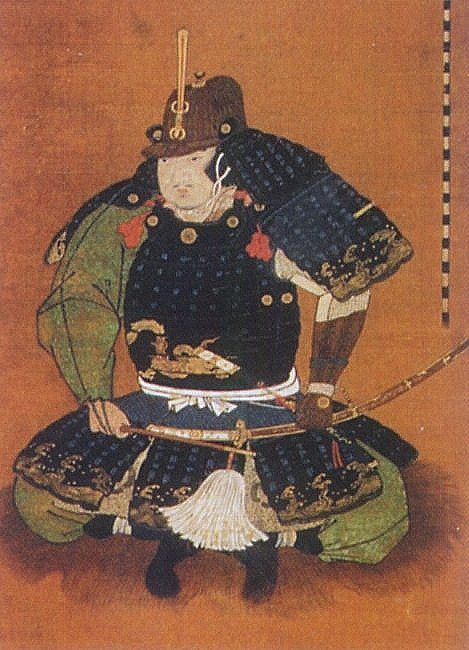
Sakakibara Yasumasa sitting in agura position

Sitting cross-legged, agura, is considered informal: it is appropriate for certain situations but not others. It is common in informal situations, such as eating at a low table in a casual restaurant, and allowed in formal situations especially for those for whom seiza is difficult, such as elderly or non-Japanese people.

=== Yokozuwari ===
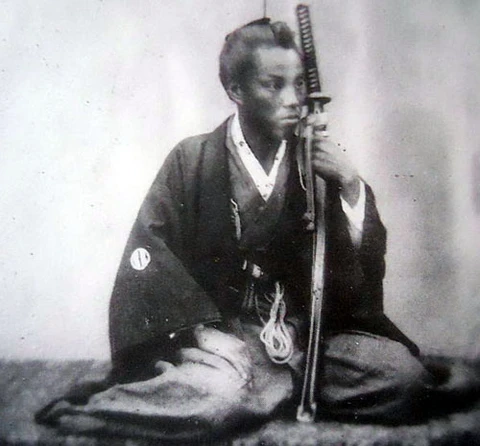
A seated samurai holding his sword with one hand.

Some sitting postures (e.g. agura, tatehiza, etc.) are impossible to do in skirts or certain types of women's traditional clothing (such as the premodern kimono) without risk of exposure, so an alternative informal sitting posture has both legs off to one side, with one side of the hips on the floor, termed yokozuwari (横座り; "sideways sitting").

=== Wariza ===
Another informal sitting posture for women is called wariza (割座; "separate/split sitting", "w-sitting" or "reverse tailor style sitting") which resembles seiza posture, whereby the buttocks are on the floor and the lower legs are bent off to their respective sides.

=== Kiza ===
To sit in seiza requires coming to a kneeling position momentarily, with the heels propped up; if one remains seated on the heels with the balls of the feet touching the floor and toes flexed forward, it is called kiza (跪座 / 跪坐). If one then lowers the tops of the feet to the floor, one then will be in the seiza position. In some schools of iaido, practitioners stand up to draw the sword and cut after momentarily assuming kiza, so as not to sprain the instep jumping up directly from seiza.

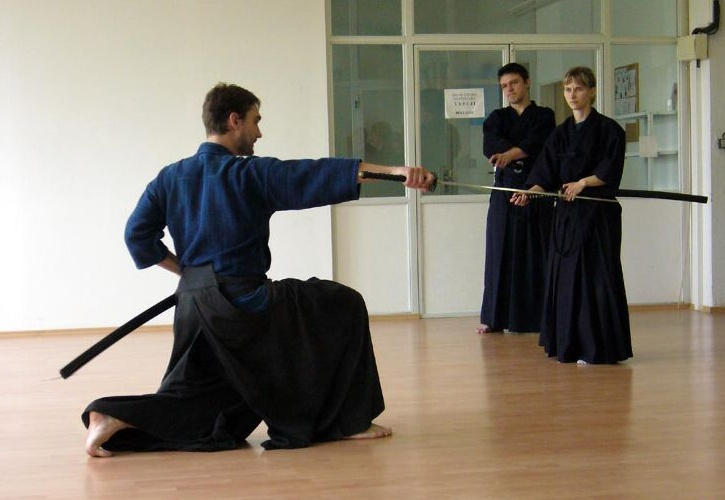
This iaido practitioner is executing a cut directly from kiza

== See also ==
- Genuflection
- Kowtow
- Vajrasana (yoga)
