= Standing wheelchair =

Wheelchair that can switch to standing position

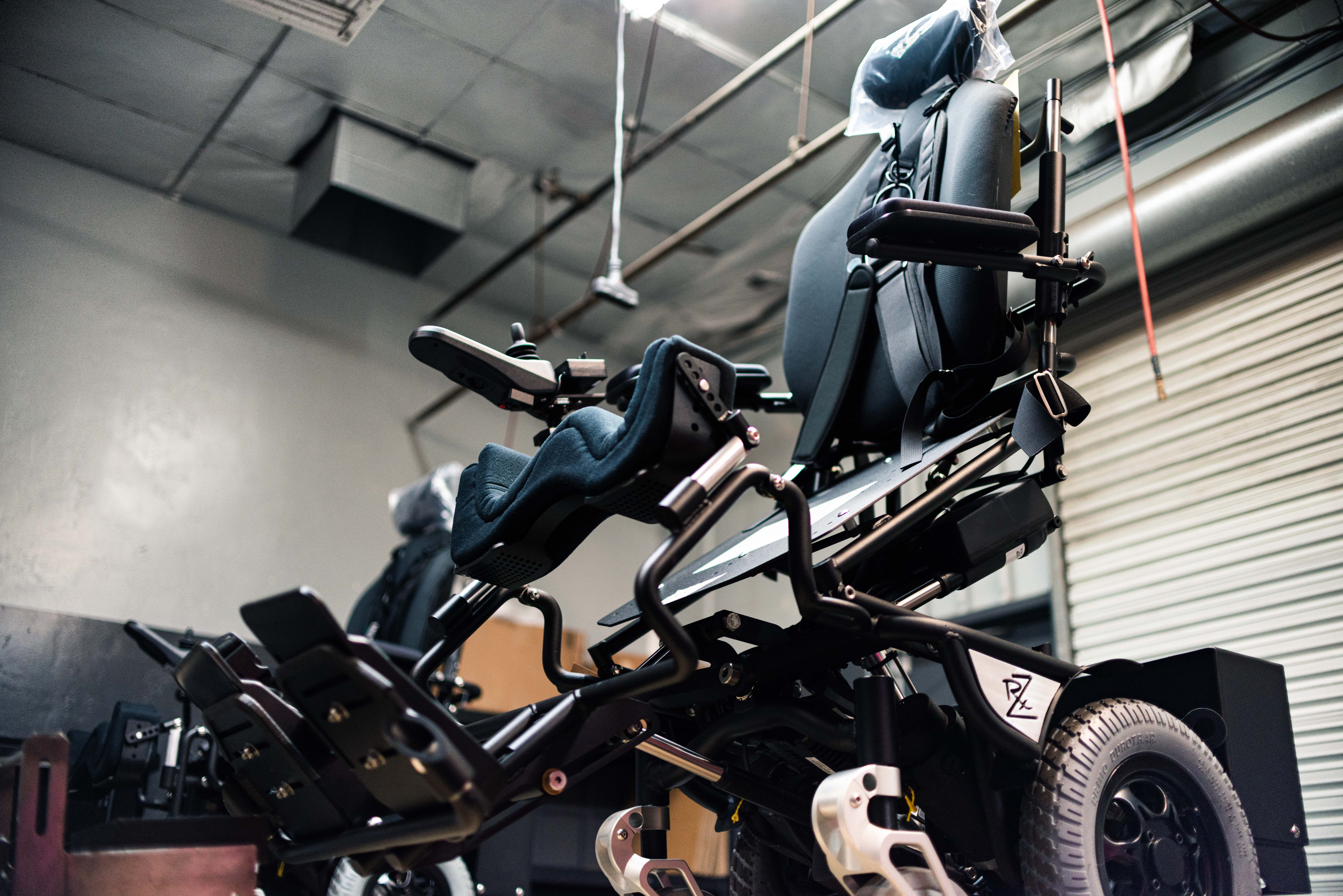
A standing wheelchair is an automated device that assists its user in moving from a seated, to standing position and oftentimes back to flat if the chair has the capabilities of doing so. Standing wheelchairs are common among individuals with: muscular dystrophy, multiple sclerosis, and other ailments that compromise mobility functions.

A standing wheelchair (also known as a standing chair, a wheeled stander or a stander) is assistive technology, similar to a standing frame, that allows a wheelchair user to raise the chair from a seated to a standing position. The standing wheelchair supports the person in a standing position and enables interaction with people and objects at eye level.

== Design and function ==
While they all hold the same basic function, there is much variety within standing wheelchairs. As assistive devices, standing wheelchairs are primarily designed according to their user's needs. The lifting mechanisms incorporated can be either manually operated or powered with hydraulic devices that range in strength. Wheels can also be power-operated or manual. Steel alloys are often used in production to strike a balance of durability, strength, flexibility and lightness, however there are heavier and lighter metals available. Specific models are built to be used regularly while others only assist in specific tasks. Some standing wheelchairs may even be driven from the standing position, however there is medical concern of an increased risk of bone fractures while driving due to the legs being under a heavy load.

== Diagnosis and users ==
Standing wheelchairs are used by people with mild to severe disabilities including: spinal cord injury, traumatic brain injury, cerebral palsy, spina bifida, muscular dystrophy, multiple sclerosis, stroke, rett syndrome, post-polio syndrome and more.

Standing chairs are used by people with both paraplegia and quadriplegia, since a variety of standing options are available to accommodate for mild-to-severe disabilities.

== Health benefits ==
Numerous studies show evidence of standing wheelchairs providing specific health benefits over their non-mechanized counterparts. Some of these benefits have included improved circulation, higher bone density, and lower risk for contractions and skeletal deformation. Several researchers and users alike report that benefits are not solely physical – the greater range of movement provided by mechanized standing wheelchairs allow users to lead more independent lives, resulting in improved mental health and a higher quality of life.

== Documentation and funding in the United States ==
Standing wheelchairs come at prices many consider inaccessible, with powered versions ranging from $10,000-$15,000. This inaccessibility resulted in a push for insurance companies to incorporate this technology into their existing plans. In 2020, the Independence Through Enhancement of Medicare and Medicaid (ITEM) Coalition appealed to the Centers for Medicare and Medicaid Services (CMS), requesting both standing wheelchairs and wheelchairs with power-elevated seats be covered under the Durable Medical Equipment Benefit. That request was partially granted in May 2023, as CMS incorporated wheelchairs with power-elevated seats into the benefit and claimed standing wheelchairs would be considered in the future.

As of Now, Medicare may help fund some portion of a standing wheelchair, while Medicaid funding varies from state to state in the U.S. Many insurance companies, vocational rehabilitation organizations, and medical case managers are increasingly funding standing wheelchairs because of the long-term health and quality of life benefits that come from passive standing.

=== Effective documentation ===
Funding (government funding or insurance) for standing equipment is achievable, but usually requires medical justification and a letter of medical necessity (a detailed prescription) written by a physical therapist or medical professional.

=== Funding sources ===
In the U.S. there are various funding options for purchasing durable medical equipment (DME) such as standing wheelchairs:

- Public insurance/government funding (i.e. Medicaid, Waivers, etc.)
- Private insurance companies (i.e. Blue Cross, health maintenance organizations (HMOs), PPOs, etc.)
- Worker's compensation
- Disability insurance
- Liability insurance (i.e. car, home, etc.)
- Out-of-pocket (cash or credit card)
- Possible payment plan through supplier
- Child's school purchase for use at school (i.e. standing is part of child's Individualized Education Program (IEP))
- Purchase by workplace for use while on the job
- Purchase through VA Hospital
- Assistance from local groups such (i.e. Rotary clubs, Lions, etc.)
- Assistance from disability groups (i.e. MDA, MS Society, etc.)

Most states have resources such as PAAT (Protection Advocacy for Assistive Technology) and State Technology Assistance Projects that are resources for consumers seeking funding or going through the appeals process.

== See also ==
- Sitting disability
- Standing chair
- Standing desk
