= Sitting disability =

Medical condition

A sitting disability is a condition in which a person has difficulties sitting or is unable to do so at all; usually due to pain. This can affect people who face little or no chronic problems with standing, as well as those who do, such as mobility aid users.

It is also known as reduced ability to sit, sitting problems or inability to sit.

Sitting disability has generally been an unrecognized disability. It is also not a well known concept, though the symptoms themselves are common for people with hidradenitis suppurativa, and severe back pain. The disabilities usually mentioned in research and legal documents are reduced mobility and visual or auditory impairments.

== Possible causes ==
Hidradenitis suppurativa may significantly limit sitting down in patients (with lesions in sacral, gluteal, perineal, femoral, groin or genital regions), and prolonged periods of sitting down itself can also worsen the condition of the skins of these patients.

Pain while sitting is a well known symptom when having ischial tuberosity pain, myofascial pain syndrome, coccyx pain (coccydynia), failed back surgery, arachnoiditis, sciatica, piriformis syndrome, and back pain in general. An inability to sit is one of the signs of chronic low back pain. Low back pain is a condition that affects a large part of the general United States population at some point in life. 65 to 80% of Americans have an episode of low back pain at some time in their lives. Although most cases resolve quickly, 40% recur and 5% result in a residual disability after one year.

In the U.S., acute low back pain (also called lumbago) is the fifth most common reason for all physician visits. About nine out of ten adults experience back pain at some point in their life, and five out of ten working adults have back pain every year.

With several severe pain syndromes, like neuralgia or pelvic pain (symphysis pubis dysfunction), pain during pregnancy or after given birth, the pain can be aggravated by sitting.

It is possible to get Social Security benefits for a sitting disability.

Sitting problems are usually an invisible disability. This, combined with the fact that reduced ability to sit is not mentioned in research or anti-discrimination laws, makes it even harder for people to live with this kind of impairment.

== Equality and accessibility ==
A person with a sitting disability caused by excessive pain is unable to sit or stand for long periods of time, and will need to lie down. The availability of benches or other devices where one may lie down may be a critical factor that determines whether a means of transportation or a public building is usable or not for many people with this form of disability. Public buildings and transportation such as flying are often inaccessible to people with severe sitting problems. People with both sitting- and mobility problems may have to use a wheelbench, which is usually too large to fit into an elevator.

A sitting disability is a medical condition that makes a person unable to sit, not unable to move. It is not the inability to access the building that prevents a person from being in a building, it is the lack of places to lie down or comfortable reclining chairs. Accommodations for people who have a sitting disability are being enforced as Western nations integrate universal design into their societies. In 2013, the Anti-Discrimination Ombud in Norway ruled that a person with sitting disability was discriminated against when denied transport for disabled people.

For some medical conditions like pudendal neuralgia, avoiding activities like sitting, which worsen the condition, is regarded as crucial. An inability to sit requires major life adjustments.

People with this condition are often totally disabled in that there are few jobs in which a person is able to lie down, and not required to stand or sit for extended periods of time. Individuals with this condition in the United States are unseen because of a lack of suitable mass transit, and the lack of public places to lie down in a socially acceptable manner. They often remain at home even though they may be totally ambulatory.

Reclining power chairs are a more reasonable option because they allow access where wheel cots do not. Properly modified by removal of foot rests and replacement with an ottoman type leg rest provides a reasonably comfortable option. The leg lift option along with suitable back padding and cushions is required. These chairs are readily available through most power chair manufacturers. This allows the user to be autonomous and not dependent on a caretaker.

== Media coverage ==
A noncommercial video about sitting disability was run on Norwegian national TV on holidays in 2013 and 2014.

The American college radio DJ Laurie Cohen has neuropathy in her pelvis after she was rear ended in a car accident. The severe pelvic pain prevents her from being able to sit.

== See also ==
- Right to sit
- Standing chair
- Standing wheelchair
