= Telephone desk =

Small writing desk for a telephone

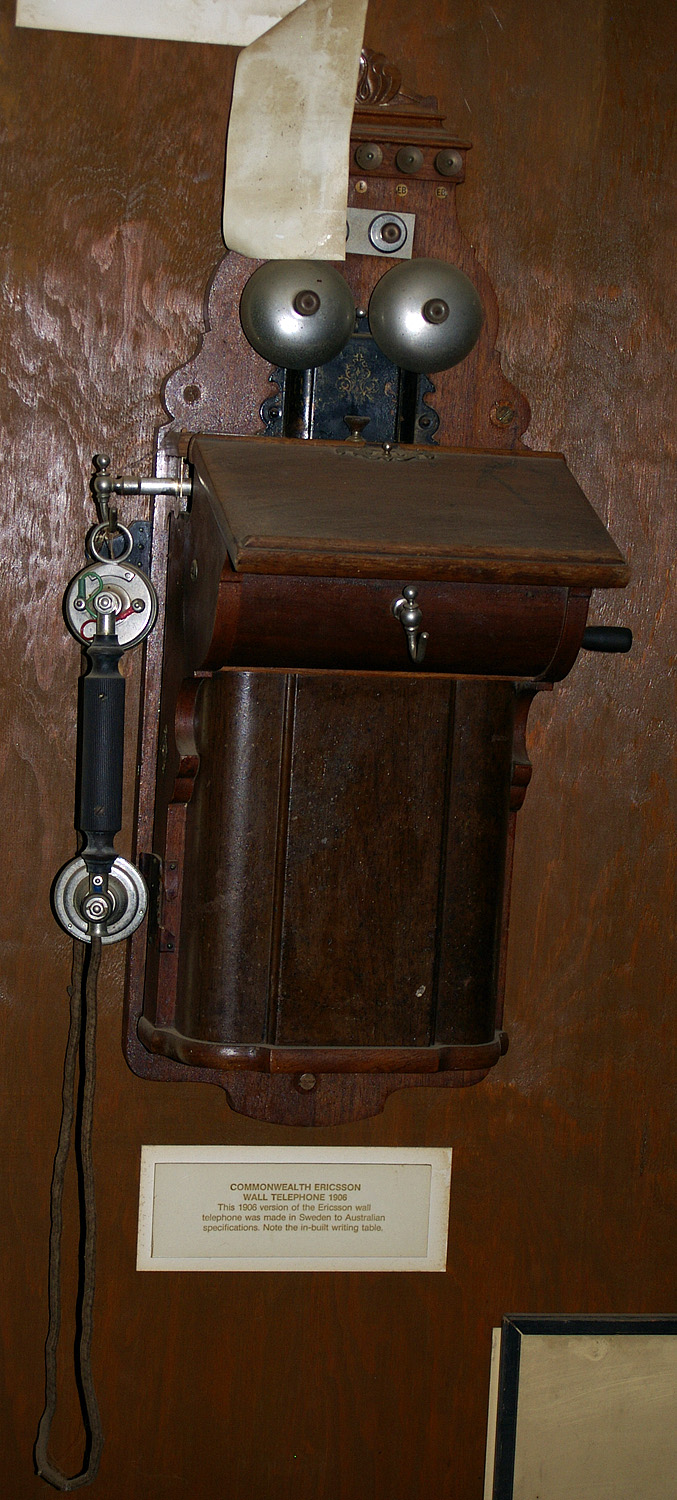
Telephone with built in writing surface

The telephone desk is the smallest kind of fixed desk. Its traditional role is to provide a working surface barely large enough to write notes while speaking on the telephone, and in some cases to support the telephone or hold telephone books. In early generations of telephones the phone apparatus itself had a small desk built in. This was most common in wall mounted telephones of the end of the 19th and the beginning of the 20th century.

The illustrations show front and side views of such an antique wall phone with a small slanted desk surface fitted with two ridges to keep paper and pencil from falling to the floor.

The telephone desk has usually been a domestic piece of furniture. In an office a telephone would normally be placed on any form of desk, as close as possible to its users.

Many 20th century telephone booths or call boxes had a tiny built-in desk surface for the convenience of customers. Vandalism and a higher concern for costs has led to the gradual elimination of these minuscule desk surfaces.

== See also ==
- Desk and bench
- Gossip bench
- List of desk forms and types.
