= Agura =

Japanese term for a cross-legged seating position

The agura position

Agura (胡坐 or あぐら, lit. 'foreign/barbarian sitting'; also called anza 安座) is the Japanese term for the position normally referred to as sitting cross-legged in English.

== Description ==
The buttocks are on the floor (or on a cushion set on the floor) and the legs are out in front, with the knees bent and each foot crossed beneath the other leg.

== Cultural background ==
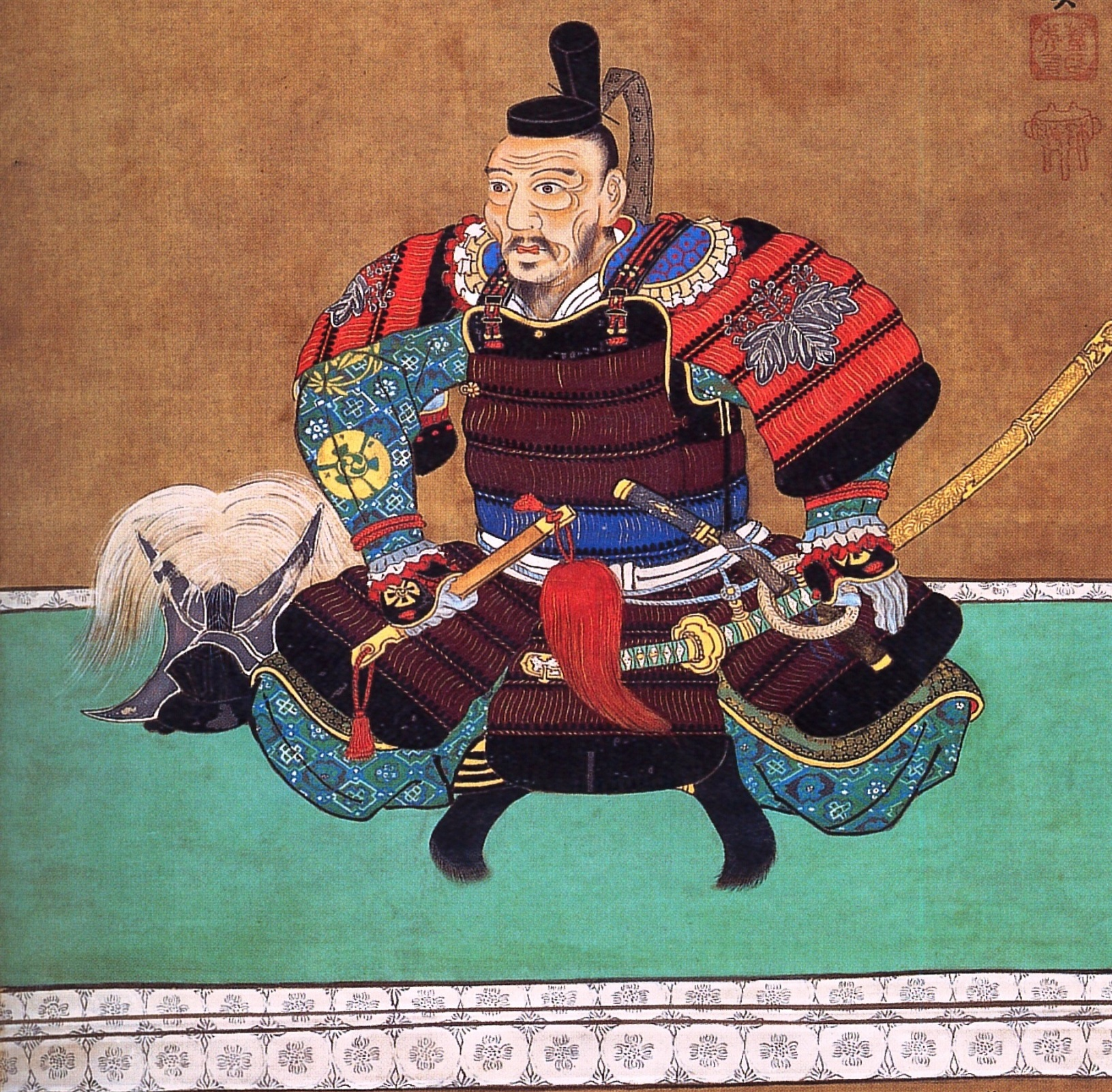
Toyotomi Hideyoshi sitting in agura position

In Japan, this posture is considered an informal alternative to the seiza (proper sitting) position, though it is generally deemed unfeminine and uncouth for women if sitting in skirts or certain types of traditional clothing, such as the kimono (mostly due to where the opening is in a premodern kimono, and the fact that women rarely wore undergarments; whereas, under certain circumstances, men could appear in public wearing only their undergarment, the fundoshi). It may also be considered impolite to sit in this manner in the presence of a superior or elders, unless permitted to do so.
