= Standing chair =

Modified chair designed to help people stand

A standing chair is a tall support for the body—a modified chair or stool—designed for standing work or to reduce fatigue.

The precursors of standing chairs are chairs that relieve sitting discomfort by providing a more open angle between thighs and torso: traditional architects' tall stools, bar stools, and more recent bar-height tables in restaurants.

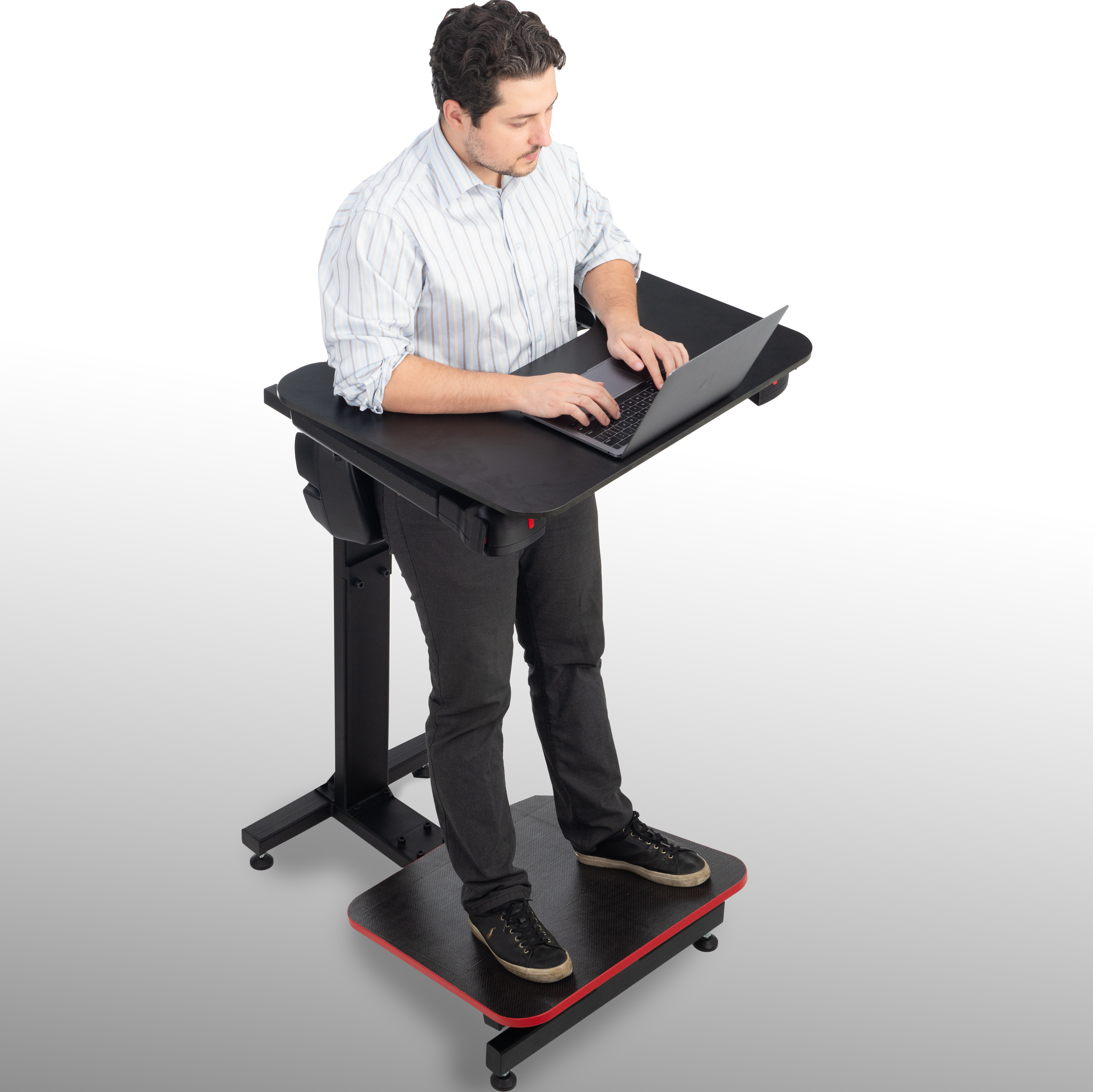
C-Infinity Standing Chair

The main purpose of standing chairs has been to help standing staff and disabled persons. One experimental study showed that an auxiliary standing chair reduces muscle fatigue of standing workers more than an ordinary office chair. Such chairs are recommended to relieve postural constraint in standing workers. Standing chairs have been introduced in public buses for peak traffic periods and for handicapped persons who have to travel standing up.

A standing chair should not be confused with a standing wheelchair, which helps disabled people who cannot stand on their own.

== See also ==
- Right to sit
- Sitting disability
