= Ezboard =

ezboard
- Website type: bulletin board system
- Owners: ezboard, Inc.
- Creator: Vanchau Nguyen
- Commercial: Yes
- Registration: Required
- Launched: 1996
- Current status: Defunct

ezboard, Inc., based in San Francisco, California, United States, was a provider of free and paid hosted Internet forums.

== Description ==
ezboard was a provider of a free, hosted message board for use by webmasters with little to no experience running a website. Along with premade ezboard templates and a color-picking tool, the ezboard community also supported volunteers who help other users customize their ezboards.

ezboard offered free and paid accounts for both boards and users. The free accounts were supported by advertisements and had fewer customization and board management features. Paid members were called "ezSupporters", while paid message boards were referred to as "Gold boards". Accounts were either local (deprecated) and tied to a specific board or global and usable for posting across the entire ezboard network.

== History ==
ezboard is a web application, created in 1996 by Vanchau Nguyen. The website was one of the earliest providers of user-customizable online message boards. At its peak in 2001, it ranked among the world's top 50 most popular websites.

In 2001, ezboard launched its first CSC (Community-Supported Communities) product, i.e., a paid version of ezboard without advertisements. This later split into CSC Blue (officially called CSC Community) and CSC Gold (officially called CSC Gold Community). CSC Blue removed intrusive ad pop-ups but retained ad banners for a fixed price, while CSC Gold was 100% ad-free with extra features, but at a variable cost. It was reported that some very large ezboards paid the fixed price for CSC Blue, which ultimately proved unprofitable. ezboard announced that as of August 31, 2001, they would no longer renew CSC Blue boards.

In 2002, ezboard introduced third-party image hosting. The image-hosting deal was an ordeal for ezboard. The parent company of the image hosting service filed for bankruptcy, leaving ezboard to continue operation of the image hosting in-house, while developing a new hosting product in parallel. A later announcement highlighted a miscommunication between ezboard staff and moderators with an admission that the image hosting service had been a bad decision.

On March 4, 2004, Robert Labatt was appointed as ezboard's new CEO. Vanchau Nguyen later chose to leave ezboard but remained on the Board of Directors. Vanchau left in April 2004.

On May 31, 2005, ezboard claimed it had been hacked, causing many boards to lose information, become inaccessible, or be completely wiped. Ezboard indicated that it was impossible to restore all data to all boards. Assistance was requested from the FBI, and $5,000 was offered for information that led to the direct arrest and conviction of the hacker.

== ezboard and Yuku ==
Yuku was the successor to ezboard. It has been in alpha/beta software since it was first unveiled at DEMOfall 2005. On January 9, 2008, it was confirmed that Yuku was "coming out of beta", although a date has not been set.

As of January 8, 2008, it has been confirmed that all ezboard communities will be moving to Yuku. However, board owners can ask for a delay in the migration process.

As of January 15, 2008, the ezboard home page redirects to a Yuku Welcome page. A link allows users to log into ezboard.

On September 8, 2011, Yuku was acquired by CrowdGather, Inc. The acquisition included all legacy ezboard domains.

== Technology ==
ezboard was written in Smalltalk VisualWorks 3.1 by Vanchau Nguyen with Jay O'Connor. There was no database used on the back-end, but instead a built-in flat-file object-oriented datastore (BOSS) which together with the overall power of the Smalltalk language, made the code fast and compact for the time.

ezboard used a flat file system consisting of binary objects. It had no relational database. Attempts were made to migrate the database to a traditional RDBMS but attempts failed because they were too slow. ezboard was an early form of a NoSQL style database as the objects were essentially JSON type data (key-value pairs). The flat files were stored in deep nested directory structures

Ezboard's creator, Vanchau Nguyen, said he had "bet his company, and his future, on Cincom Smalltalk". He also mentions ezboard's userbase, listed as having nearly 20 million registered users.

Kep C. Kepler was the 1st CIO and director of technology.
