= Art Nouveau furniture =

Furniture style, 1890s to 1914

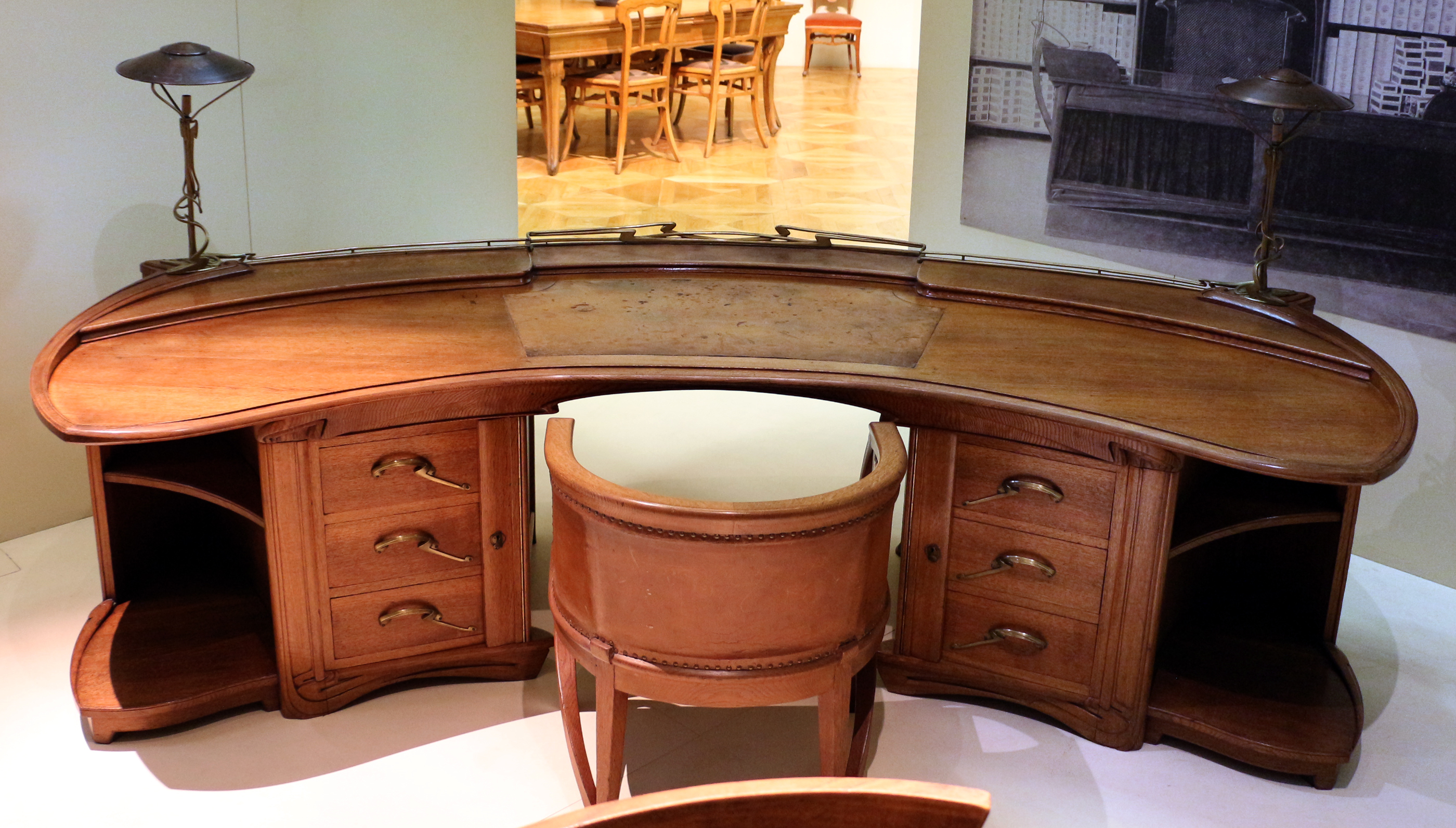
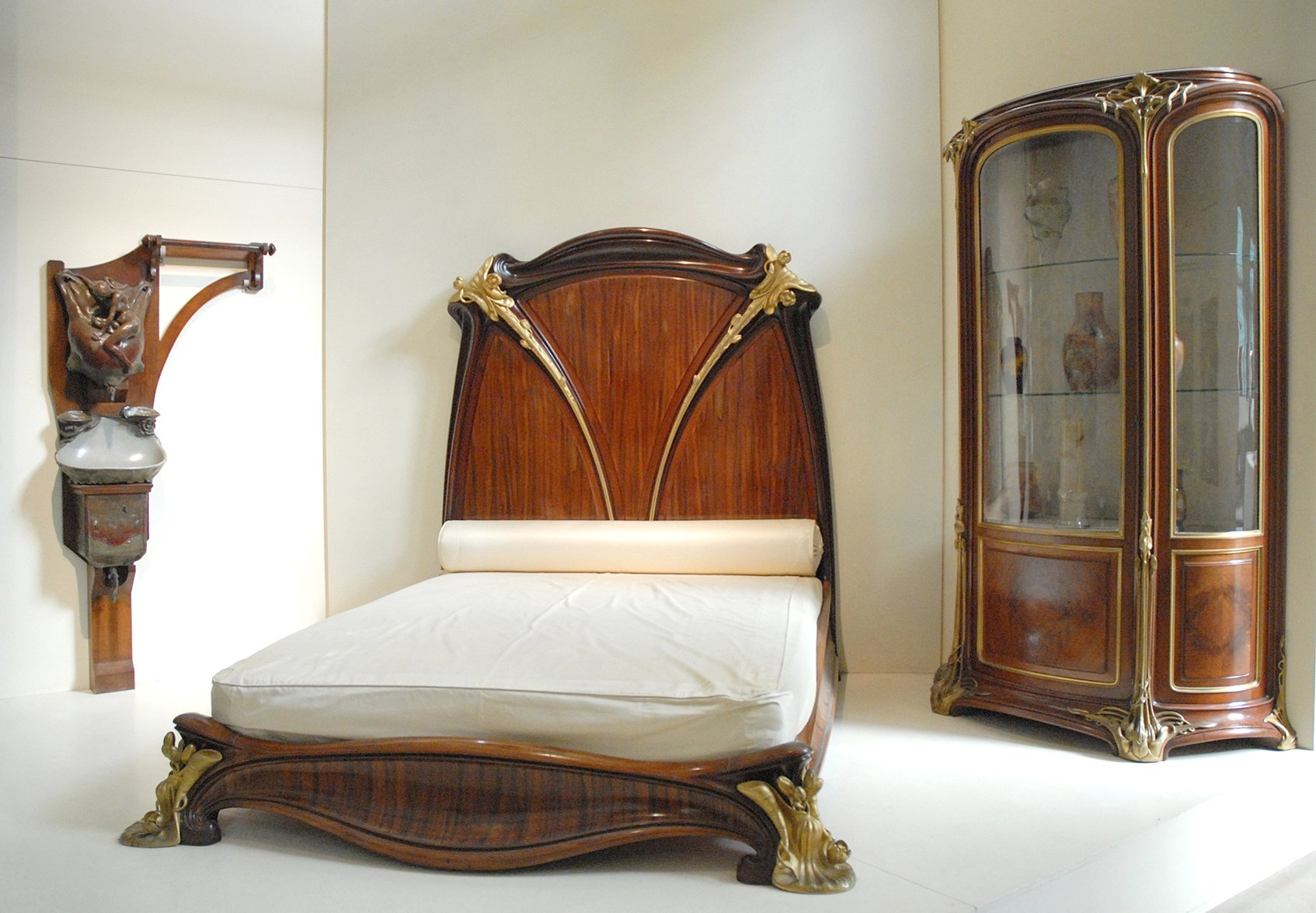
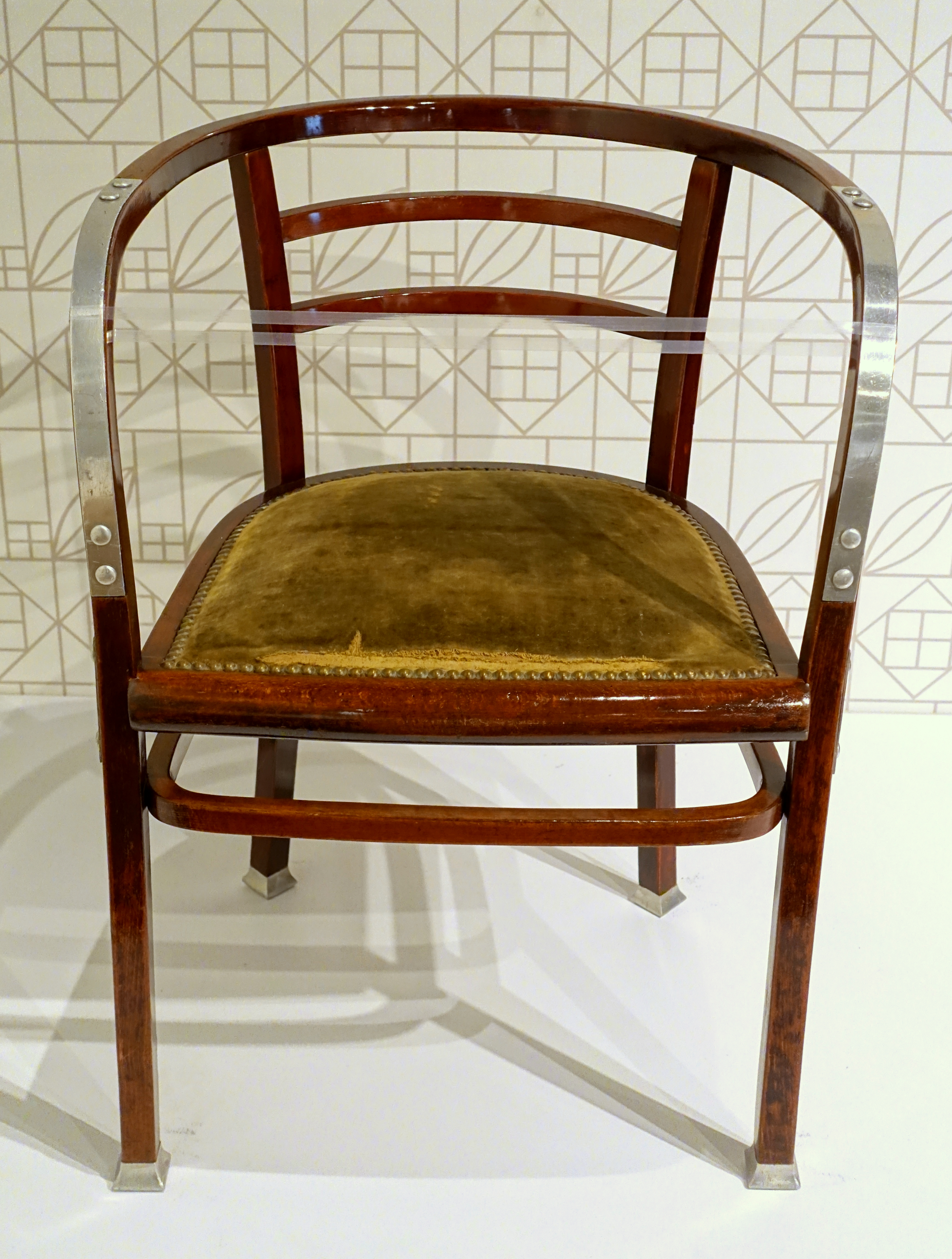
- Top: Desk by Henry Van de Velde (1898); Center: Water Lily bedroom set by Louis Majorelle (1902-1903); Bottom: beechwood, cane and aluminium armchair by Otto Wagner (1905–1906)
- Years active: c. 1893–1910
- Location: Europe and United States

Furniture created in the Art Nouveau style was prominent from the beginning of the 1890s to the beginning of the First World War in 1914. It characteristically used forms based on nature, such as vines, flowers and water lilies, and featured curving and undulating lines, sometimes known as the whiplash line, both in the form and the decoration. Other common characteristics were asymmetry and polychromy, achieved by inlaying different colored woods.

The style was named for Siegfried Bing's Maison de l'Art Nouveau gallery and shop in Paris, which opened in 1895. It was usually made by hand, with a fine polished finish, rare and expensive woods, and fine craftsmanship. Luxury veneers were used in the furniture of leading cabinetmakers, including Georges de Feure and others.

In the early years of the style, Art Nouveau architects often designed the furniture to match the style of their houses. These architects included Charles Rennie Mackintosh, Antoni Gaudí, Victor Horta, Hector Guimard and Henry Van de Velde. After 1900, particularly in the furniture designed for the Vienna Secession and the German Jugendstil, the forms became simpler, more functional and more geometric, and some could be produced on assembly lines.

== Influences ==
Art Nouveau furniture was particularly influenced by the British Arts and Crafts Movement, with its emphasis on fine craftsmanship. It also adapted certain features from earlier historical styles, particularly the curling lines of French Rocaille or Rococo. Another significant influence was Japonisme, featuring the light and fragile forms of Japanese pieces, and marquetry. The Japanese style had become popular in Europe in the 1890s thanks to the galleries of Samuel Bing in Paris and Liberty and Company in London and Milan.

== Belgium ==
The first Art Nouveau houses appeared in Brussels in 1893, including the Hotel Tassel designed by Victor Horta. Horta designed not only the house and decor but also the furniture, which featured the same nature-inspired curling whiplash lines which were featured in the architecture, wrought iron balcony and stairway railings, ceramic floors, and door handles. His lines were inspired particularly by the long curling stems of plants. The furniture itself had a minimum of decoration; the decoration and form merged into a seamless unit.

Another early Belgian architect and furniture designer was Paul Hankar, who designed one of the first Art Nouveau houses in Brussels, and, like Horta, used the curving whiplash line in his furniture. Another notable Belgian furniture designer of the early Art Nouveau was Gustave Serrurier-Bovy, who adapted the natural curving forms and added more decoration, applying small brass ornaments in whiplash lines to his mahogany armoires.

Another influential Belgian furniture designer with a very different Art Nouveau style was Henry Van de Velde. He had designed furniture for his own house, Bloemenwerf, near Brussels, in a style influenced by the British Arts and Crafts movement. He had decorated the Art Nouveau shop of Samuel Bing in Paris in 1896, and founded his own workshops in Brussels in 1898. His furniture featured the curving line, but was less exuberant. In 1897 he moved to Germany and became founding member of the German Werkbund and an influential force in German furniture design.

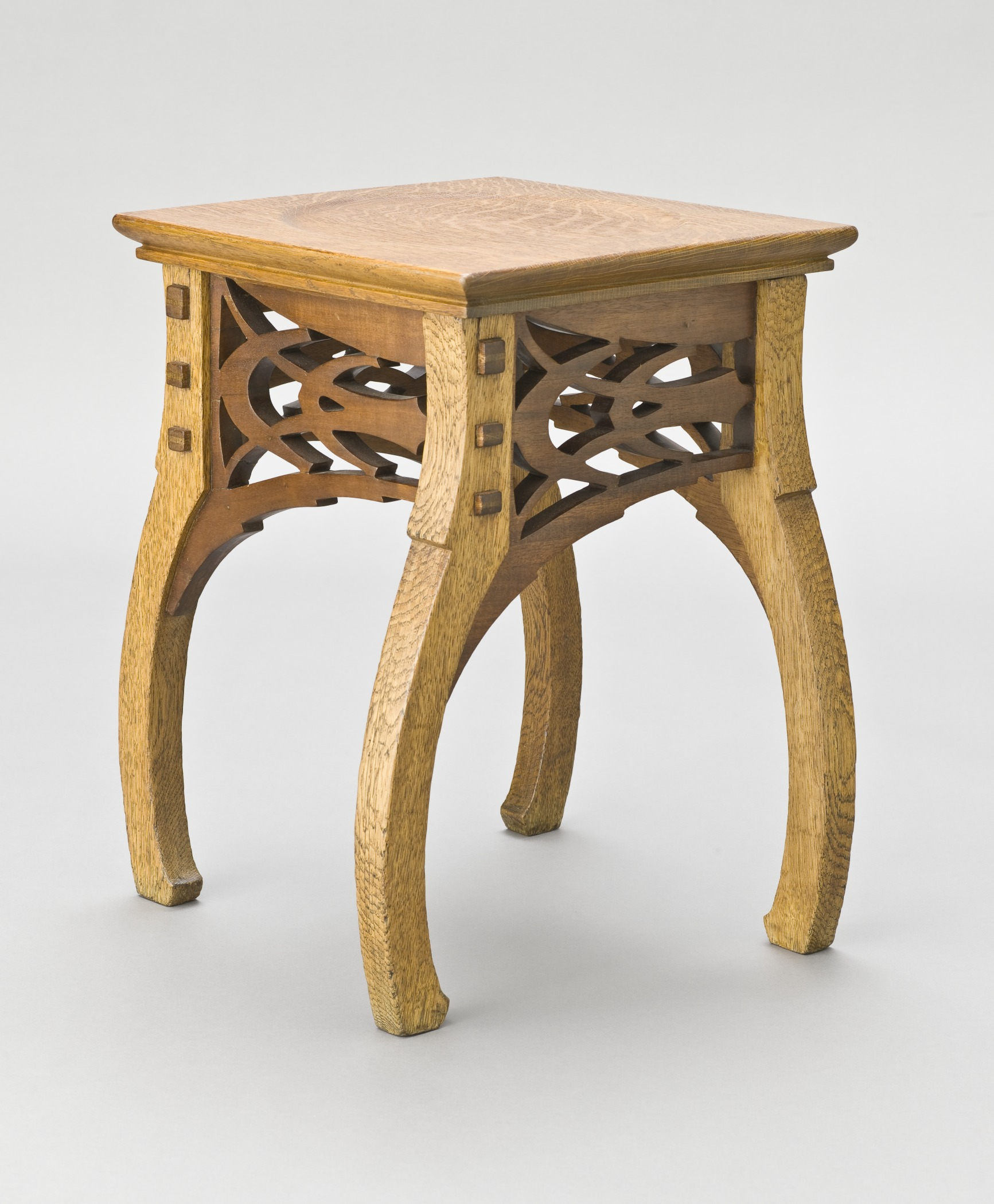
Stool by Paul Hankar (1898) (Los Angeles County Museum of Art)

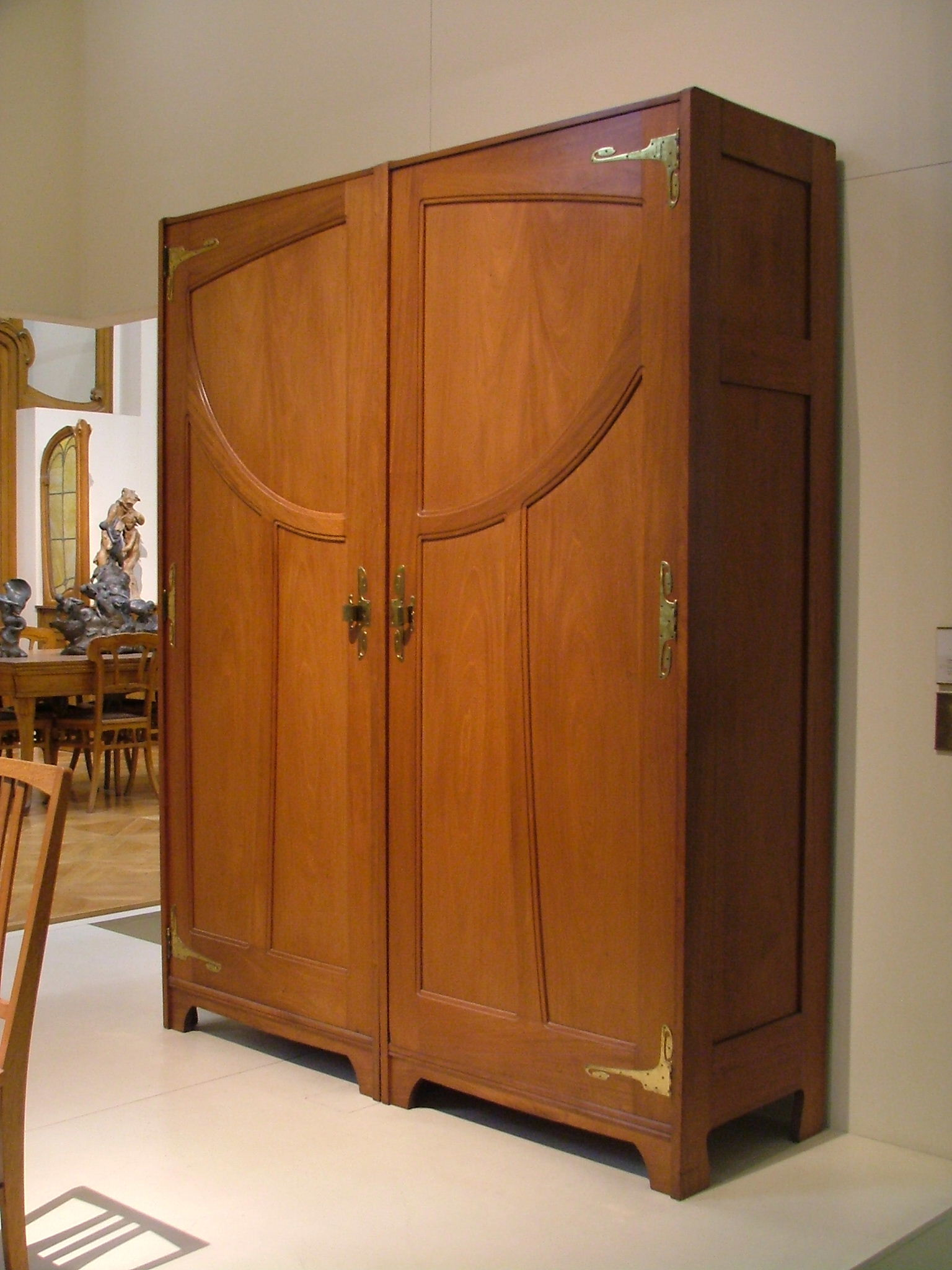
Mahogany wardrobe by Gustave Serrurier-Bovy (1899)

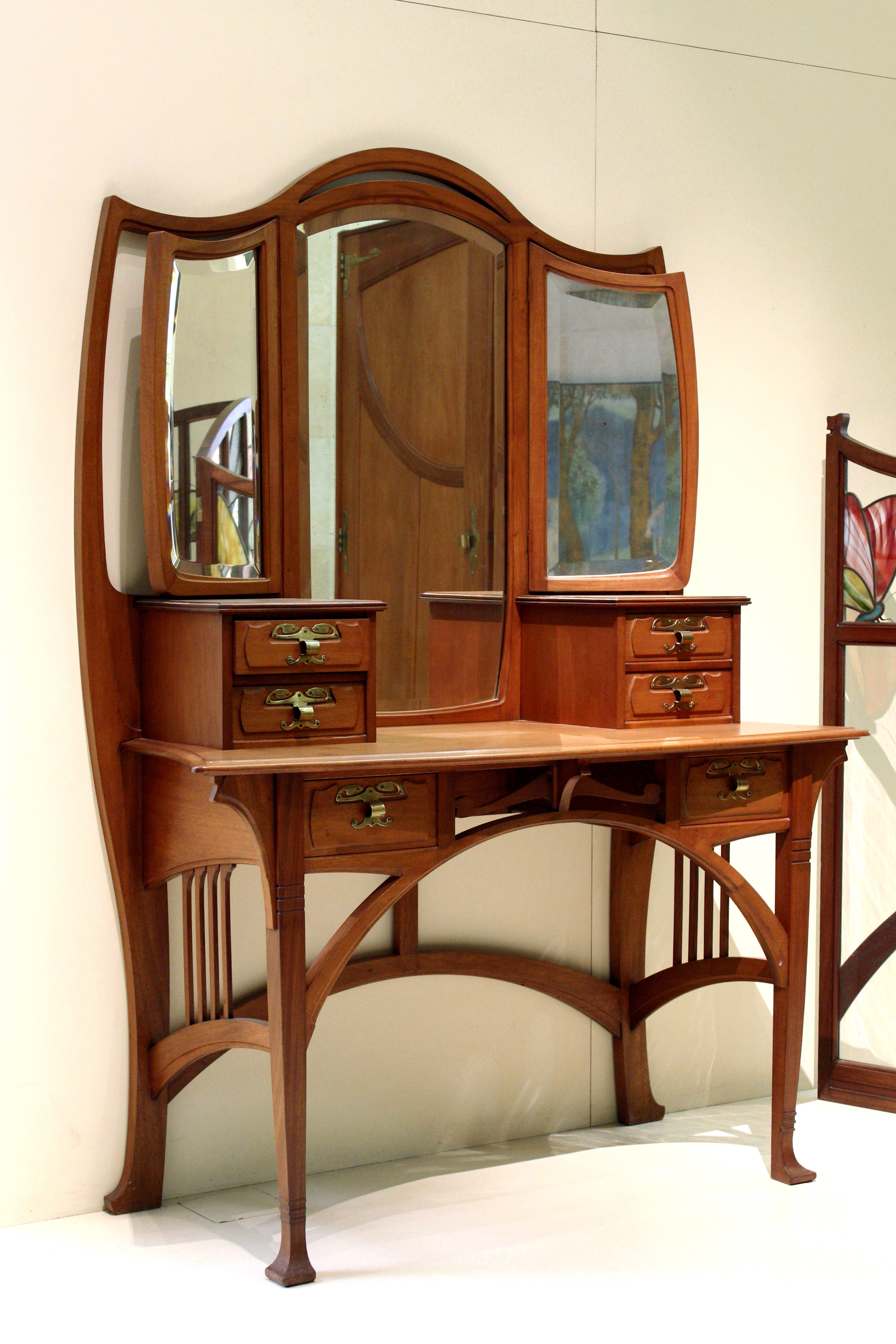
Dressing table by Gustave Serrurier-Bovy (1899)

Mahogany chair by Victor Horta (1900) (Cleveland Museum of Art)

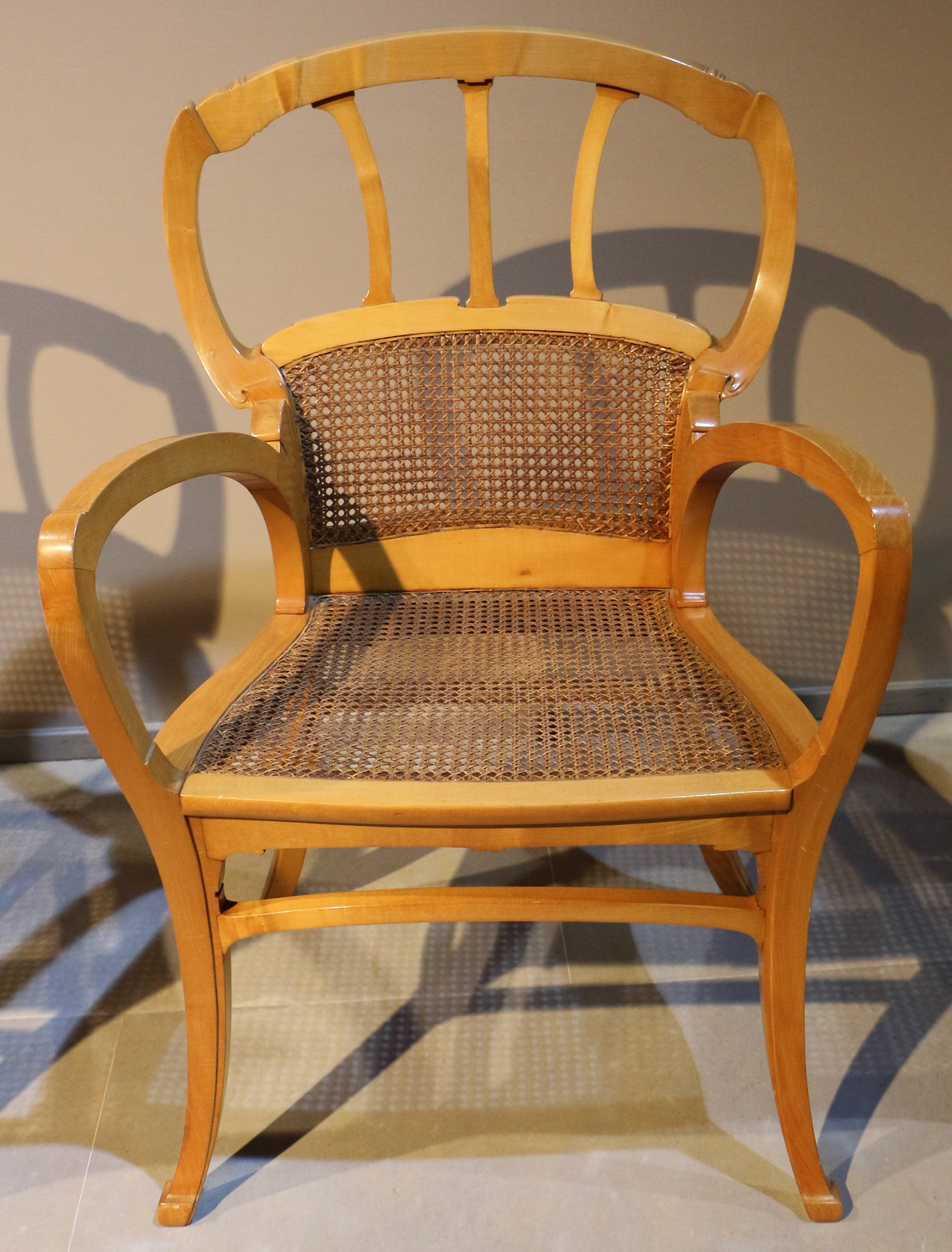
Chair by Horta from the Hôtel Aubecq (1902–1904) (Musée d'Orsay, Paris)

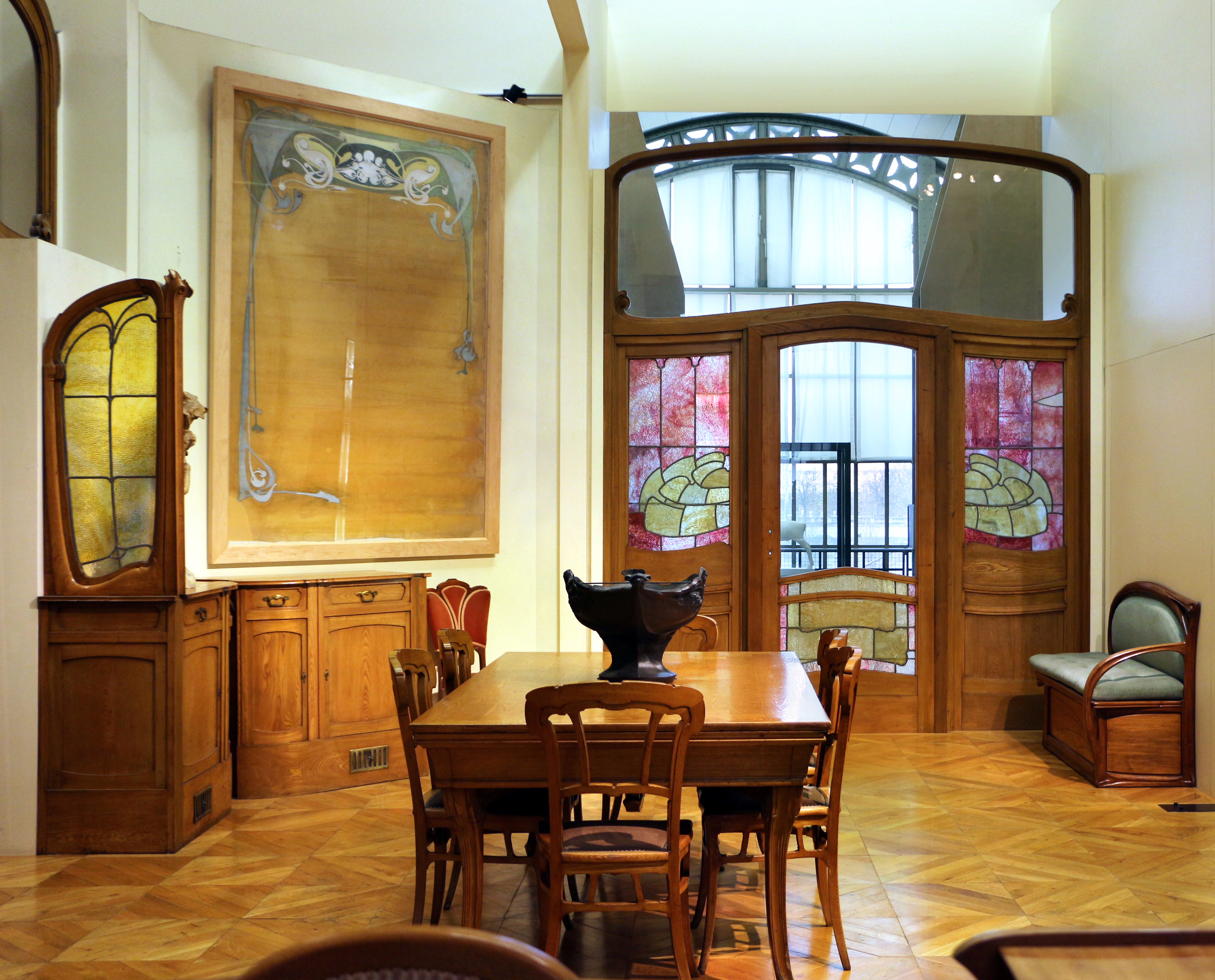
Dining room furniture and wall panel by Horta from the Hôtel Aubecq (1902–1904)

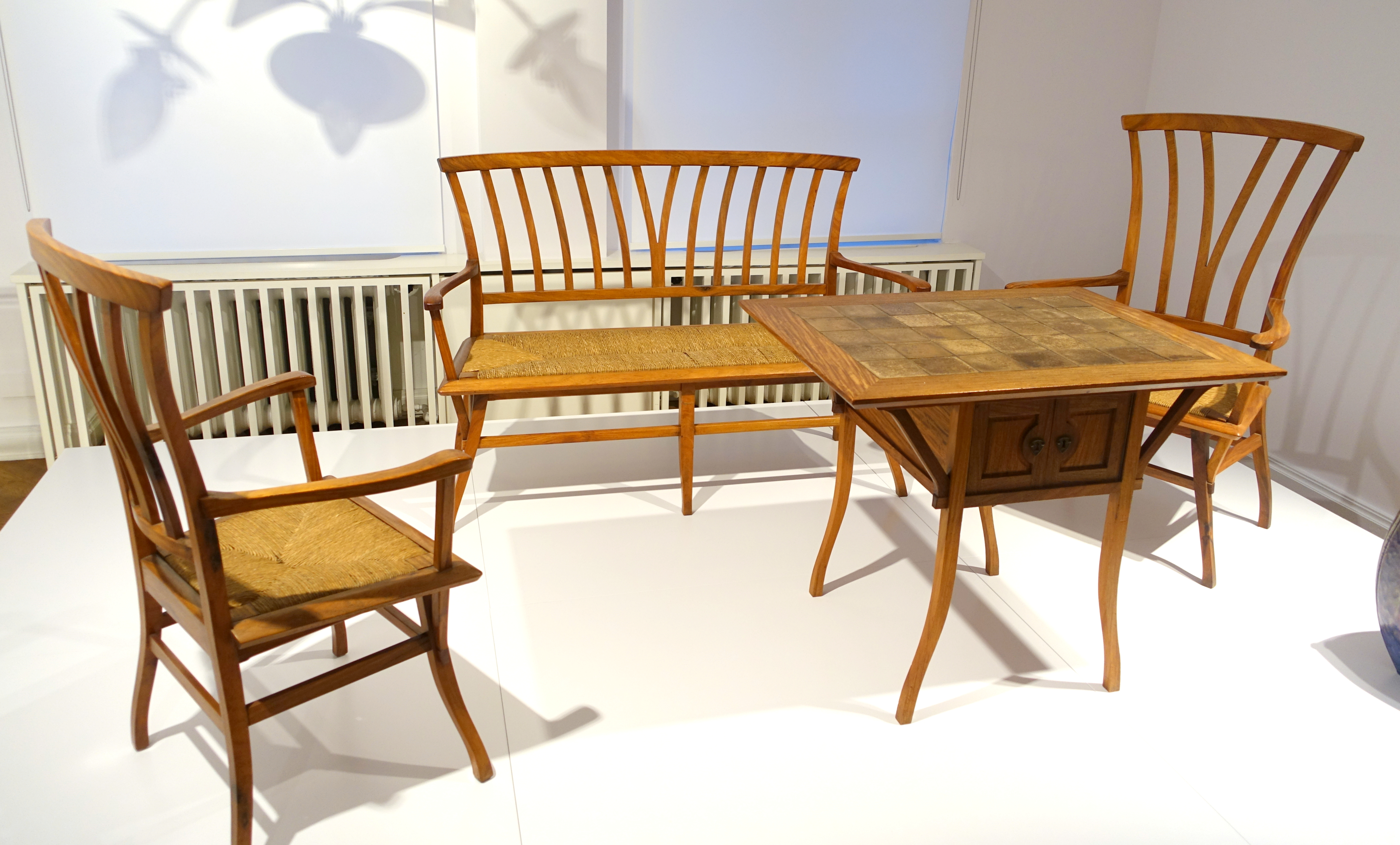
Furniture designed by Henry Van de Velde for Bloemenwerf (1895)

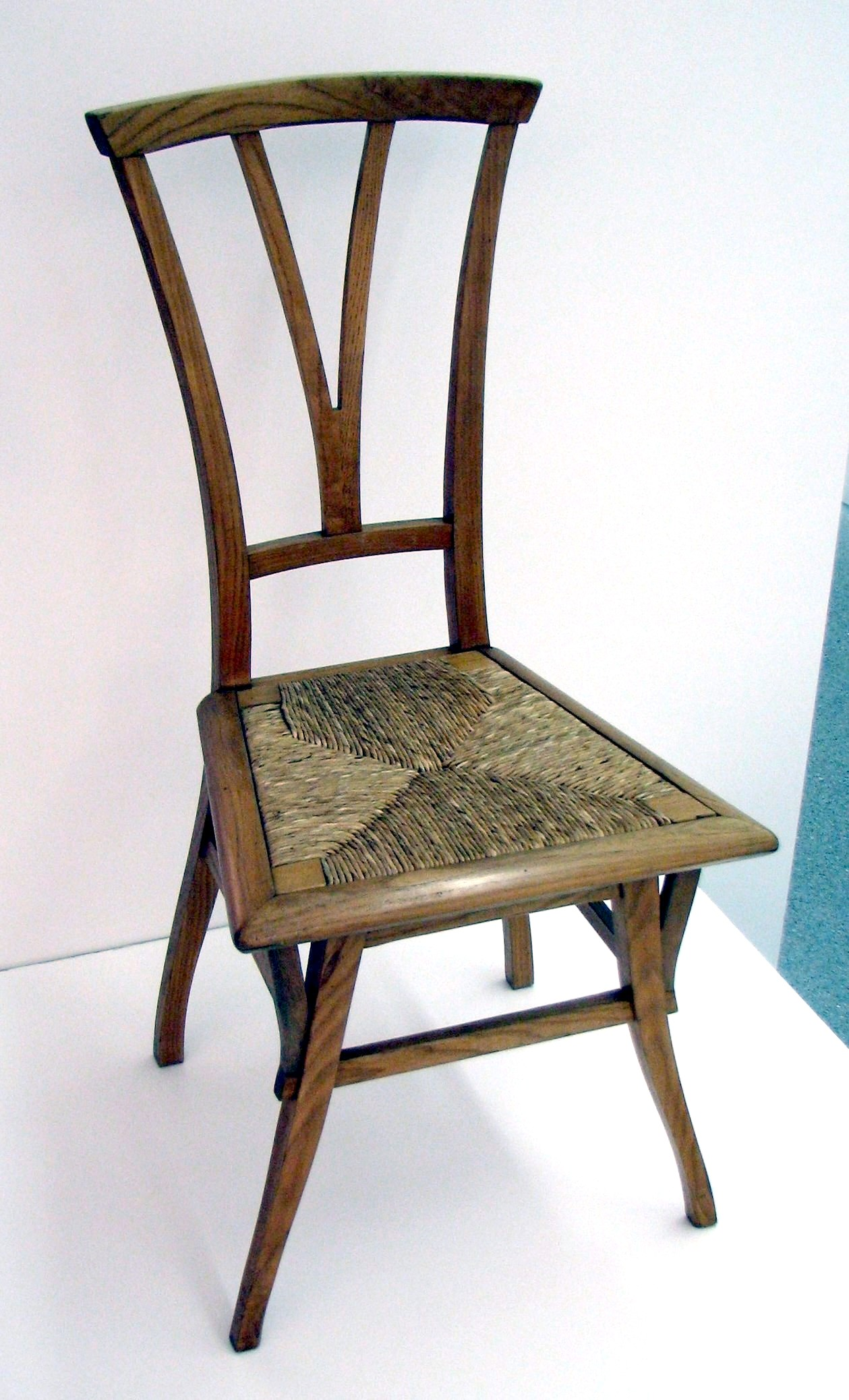
Chair by Van de Velde for Bloemenwerf (1895)

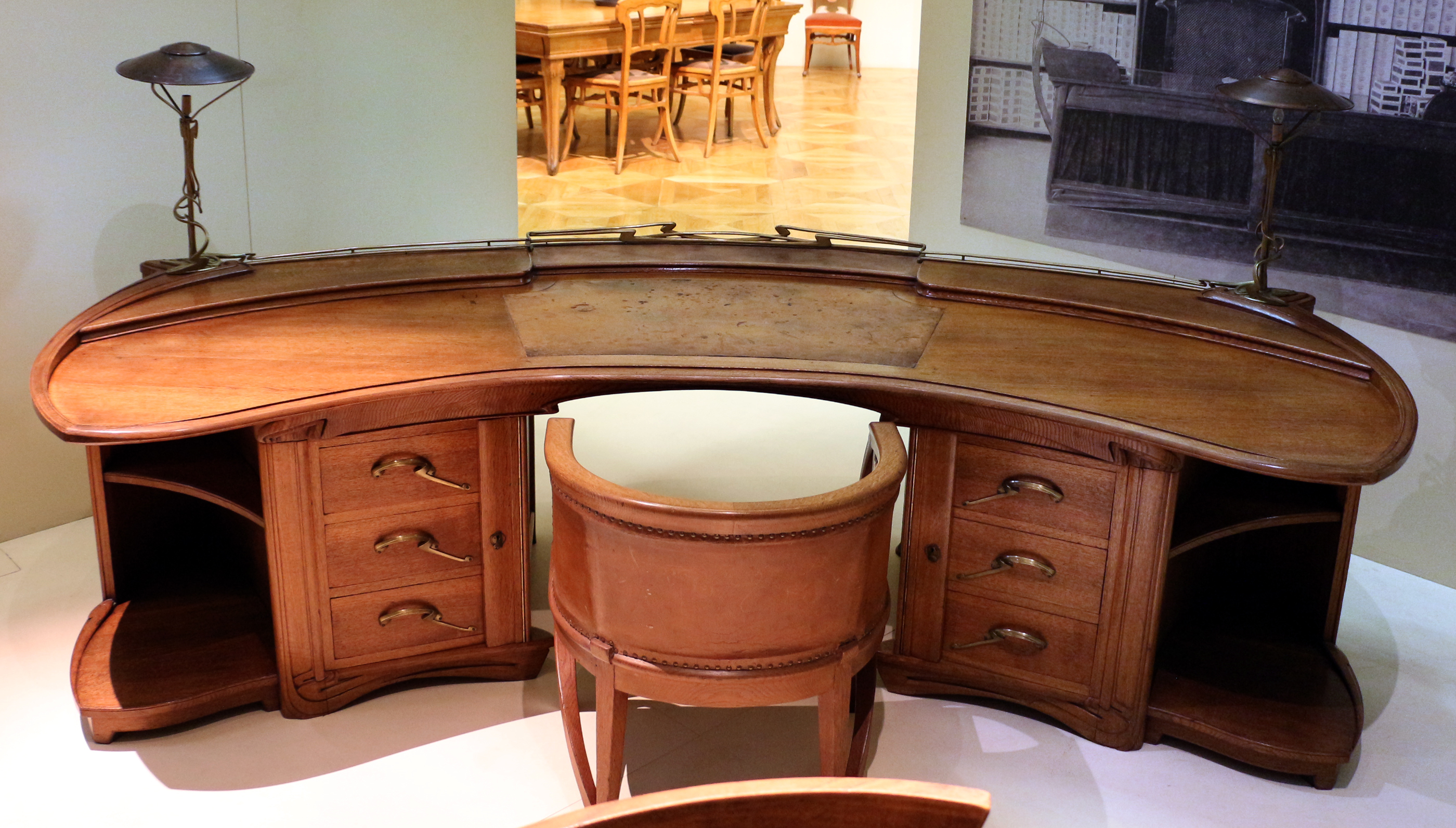
Desk by Van de Velde (1898–1899) (Musée d'Orsay)

== France – Paris and the School of Nancy ==
=== Paris – Guimard, Gaillard and de Feure ===
In France, as in Belgium, some early Art Nouveau furniture was designed by architects. After a visit to the Hotel Tassel in Brussels, Hector Guimard created the first Art Nouveau apartment house in Paris, the Castel Beranger, a curious mixture of Gothic revival and Art Nouveau elements. He also began designing sets of furniture with the naturalistic curves and decoration that were characteristic of the style. Guimard declared, "That which must be avoided art all cost in anything that is continuous is the parallel and symmetry. Nature is the greatest builder, and it makes nothing that is parallel and nothing that is symmetric." Guimard's furniture, made for his own and other residences, highlighted the curving natural forms and perfectly matched the architecture.

Eugene Gaillard and Georges de Feure showed their work at what Samuel Bing called The Pavillon L'Art Nouveau at the Paris Universal Exposition of 1900. They employed the most expensive woods, primarily from fruit trees, combined with finely made details and curling whiplash lines. They had great success first in Paris, then at the Exposition of the Munich Secession in 1897 and at the Turin International Exposition of Decorative Arts in 1902. The furniture of Gaillard was highly ornate, recalling the French Rococo, while the forms of de Feure, who was a painter and graphic artist, were more subtle, which the Art Nouveau expressed in the upholstery and details.

Alexandre Charpentier was a sculptor, medalist, craftsman, and cabinet-maker who was another notable figure in Paris furniture design, and who designed very elaborate ensembles of furniture and carved wood panelling in vegetal themes. He worked with a variety of formats and materials, including tin, marble, wood, leather, and terra cotta. Many of his custom designs for fixtures (doorknobs, door plates, window handles) were subsequently mass-produced and commercially sold.

Other notable French designers included Henri Bellery-Desfontaines, who took his inspiration from the neo-Gothic styles of Viollet-le-Duc; and Édouard Colonna, who worked with art dealer Siegfried Bing to revitalize the French furniture industry with new themes. Their work was known for "abstract naturalism", its unity of straight and curved lines, and its rococo influence.

The most unusual and picturesque French designer of early Art Nouveau was François-Rupert Carabin, a sculptor by training, whose furniture featured sculpted nude female forms and symbolic animals, particularly cats, who combined Art Nouveau elements with Symbolism. Another influential Paris furniture designers was Charles Plumet, Through his work the old vocabulary and techniques of classic French 18th-century Rococo furniture were re-interpreted in a new style.

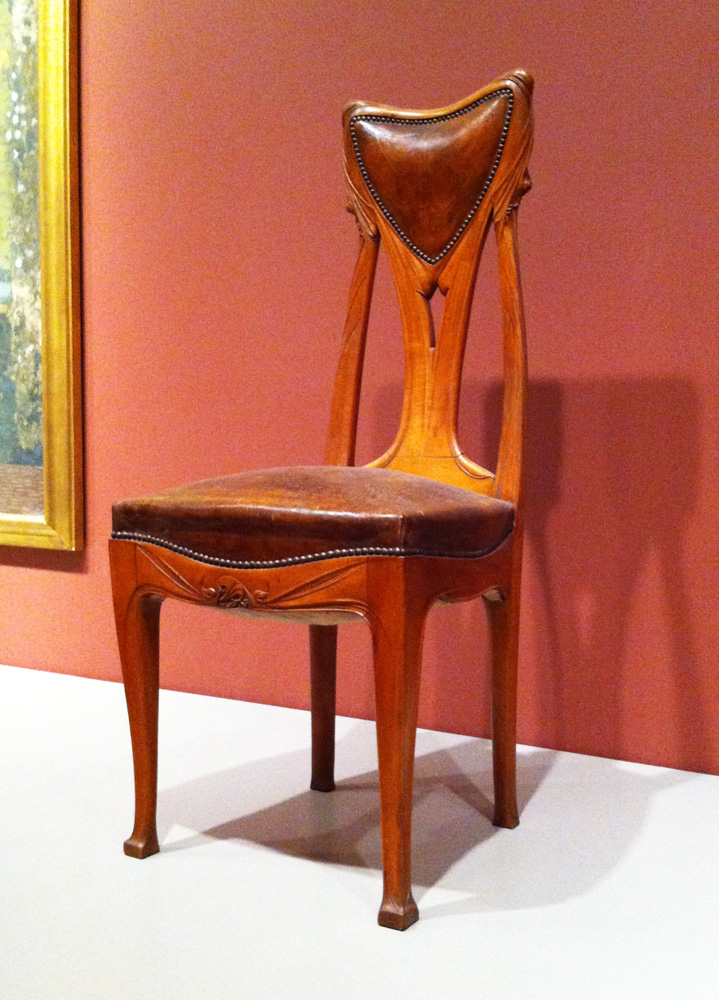
Side chair by Hector Guimard (1900) (Art Institute of Chicago)

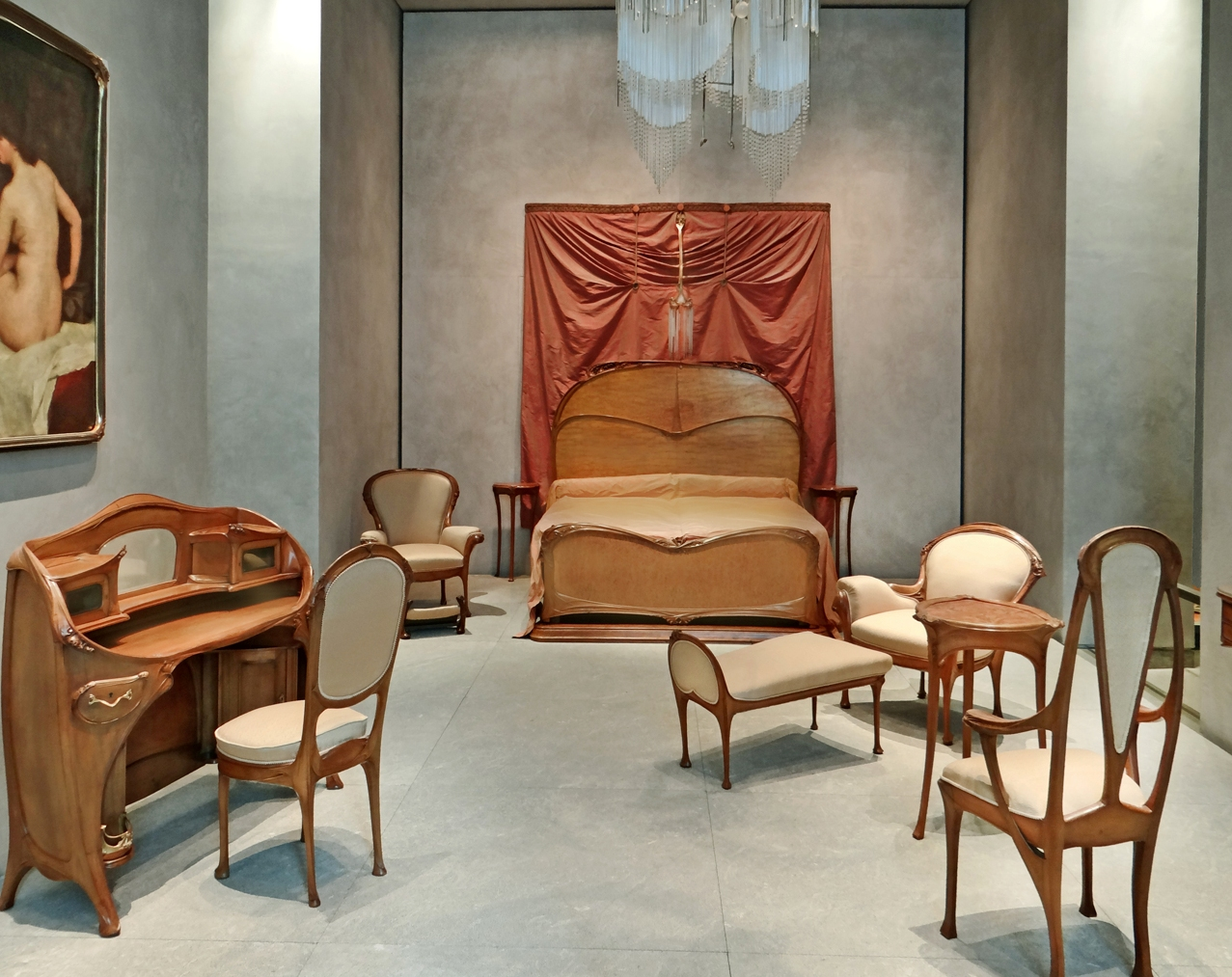
Bedroom furniture of the Hotel Guimard by Hector Guimard (now in the Musée des Beaux-Arts de Lyon)

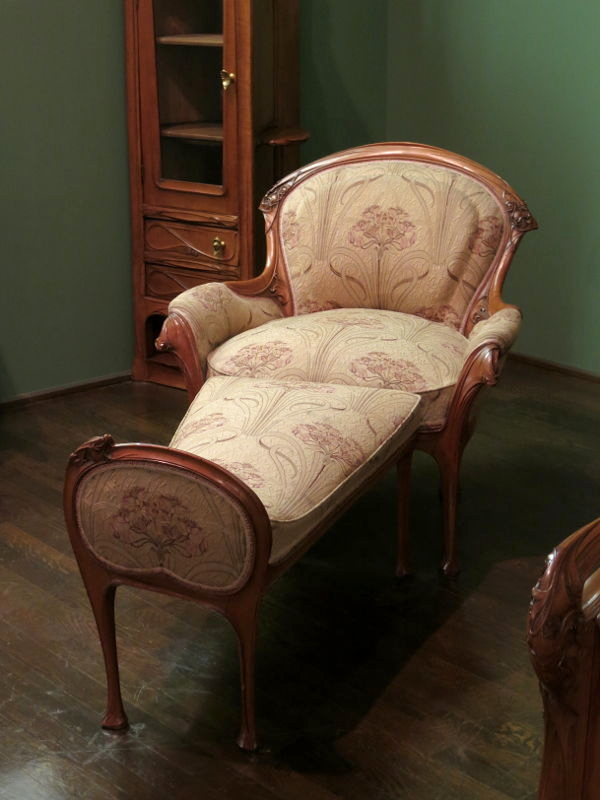
Chaise Lonngue by Hector Guimard (c. 1903) (Musée des Arts Décoratifs, Paris)

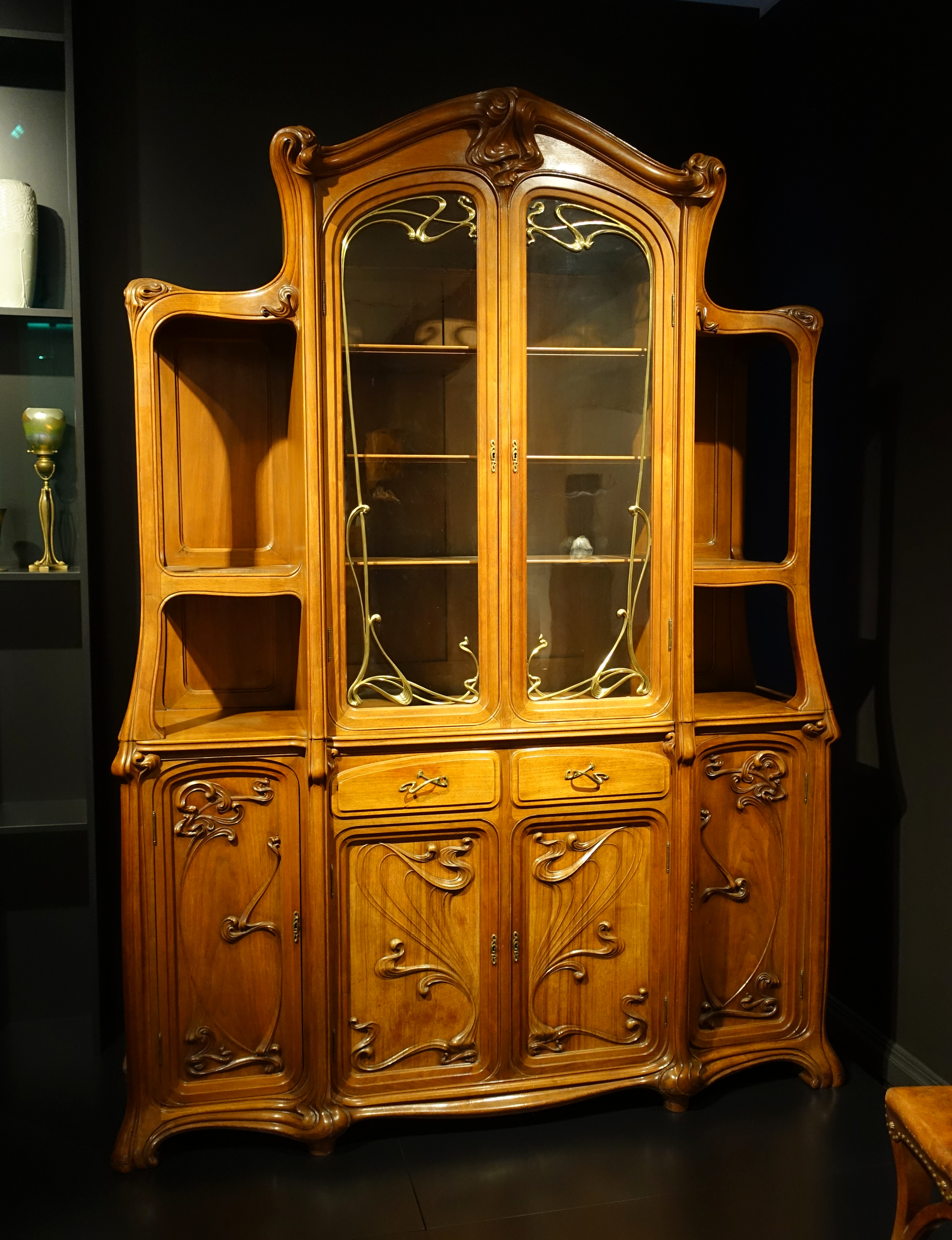
Vitrine by Eugene Gaillard (1899–1900) (Bröhan Museum, Berlin)

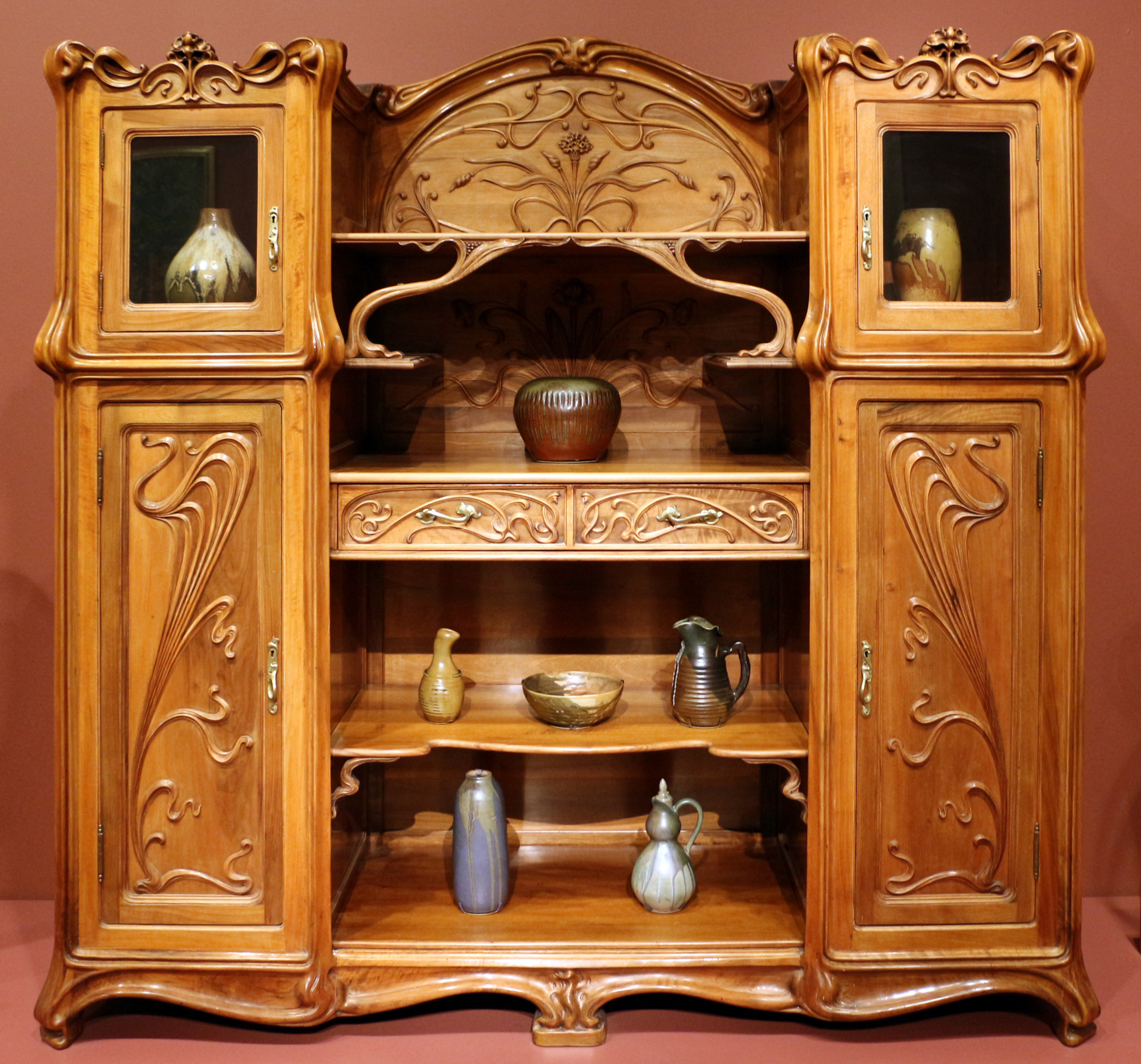
Credenza by Eugène Gaillard (1900) (Art Institute of Chicago)

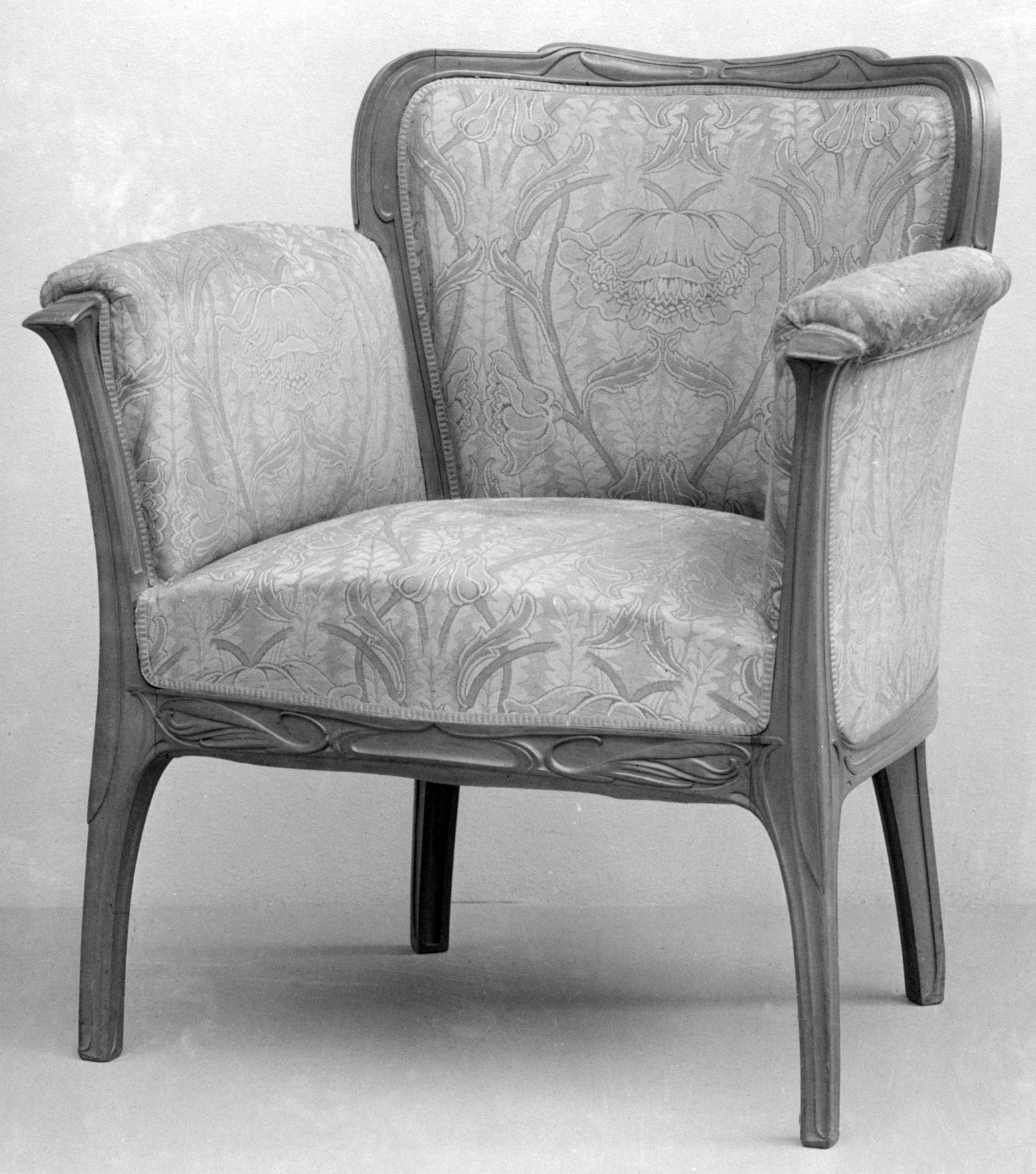
Armchair by Georges de Feure (1899–1900) (Metropolitan Museum of Art)

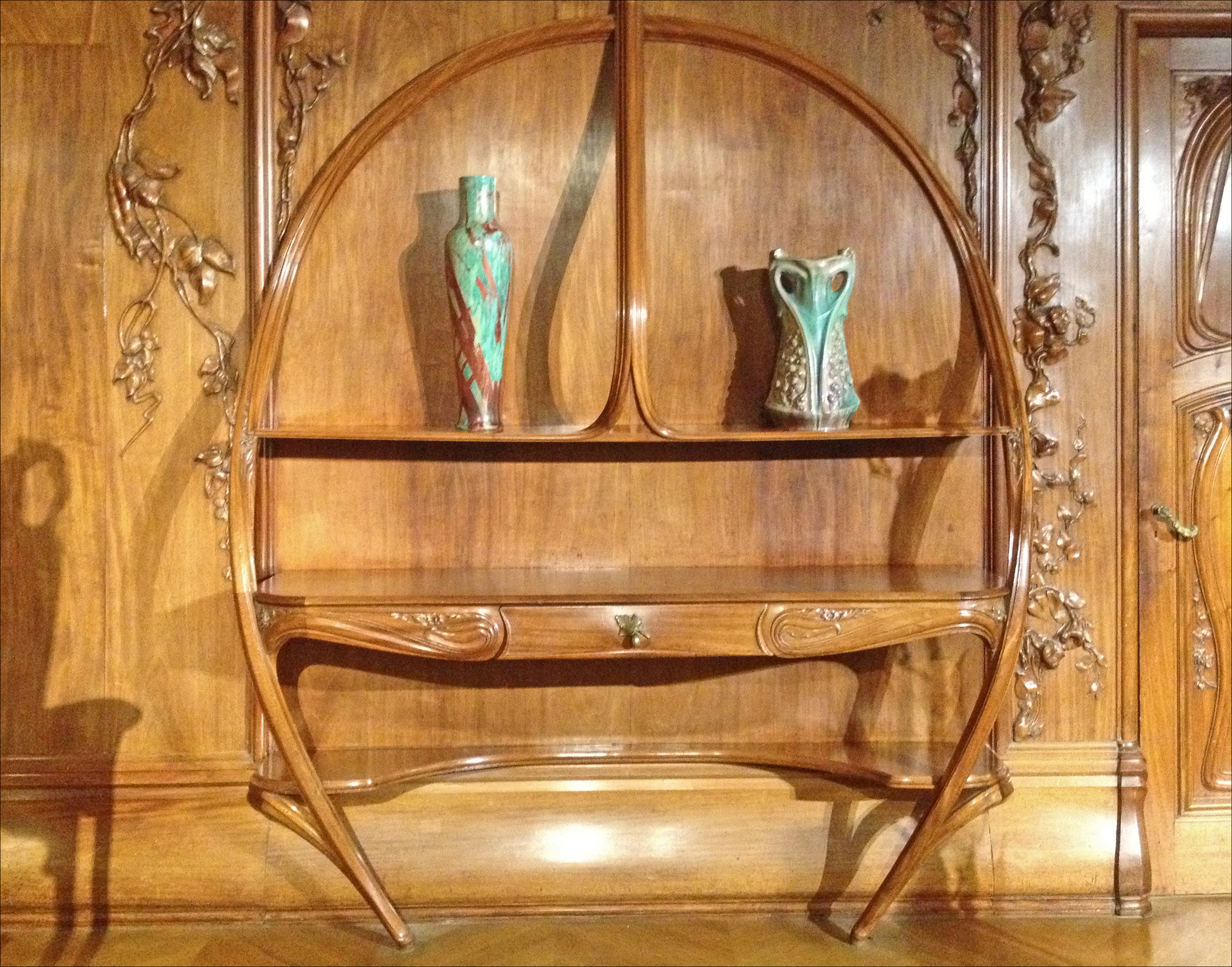
Dining room by Alexandre Charpentier (1900–1901) (Musée d'Orsay)

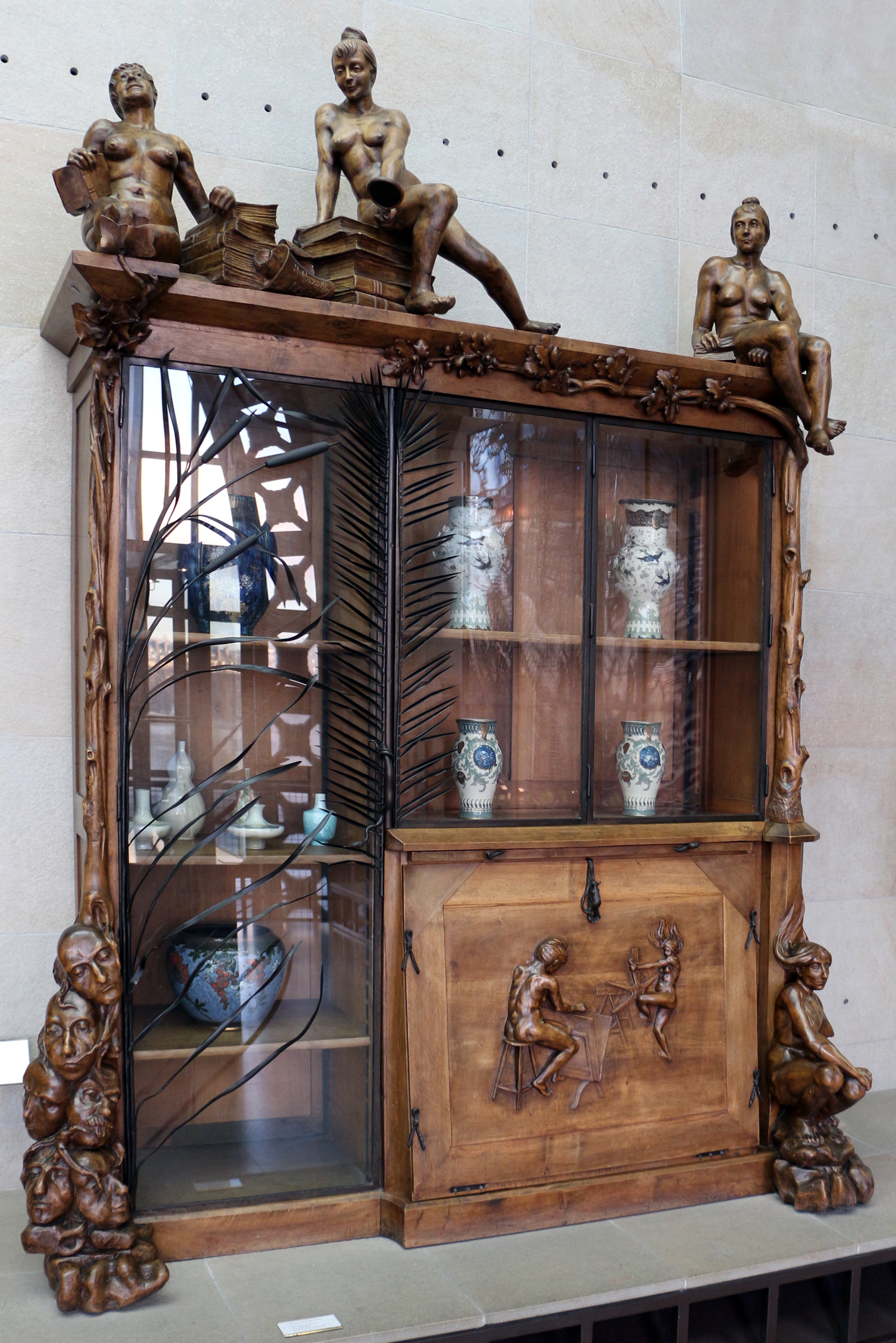
Bookcase with sculpture by François-Rupert Carabin (1890)

=== The Nancy School ===
An important center for Art Nouveau furniture design and manufacture was in Nancy, in eastern France, where Louis Majorelle had his studios and workshops, and where the Alliance des industries d'art (later called the School of Nancy) had been founded in 1901. Both designers based on their structure and ornamentation on forms taken from nature, including flowers and insects, particularly the dragonfly, a popular motif in Art Nouveau design. He especially used the water lily, an Egyptian symbol of eternal nature, which often appeared in sculpted and gilded bronze in the hardware nd decoration of furniture.

Majorelle made nature the central element, calling it "a collaborator worthy of attention", but he also insisted that the structure of the furniture should be clearly recognised, and that the beauty of a piece of furniture came not only from its decoration, but from its elegant lines and correctly proportions.

Besides furniture, Majorelle collaborated with the glass manufactory Daum on the design of lamps and other glassware. In keeping with the spirit of the Arts and Crafts Movement, he also established a factory making furniture in series for less wealthy clients. He used machines for the first phases of manufacture, but all the pieces were finished by hand.

Other notable furniture designers of the Nancy School included Eugène Vallin and Émile André; both were architects by training, and both designed furniture that resembled the furniture from Belgian designers such as Horta and Van de Velde, which had less decoration and followed more closely the curving plants and flowers.

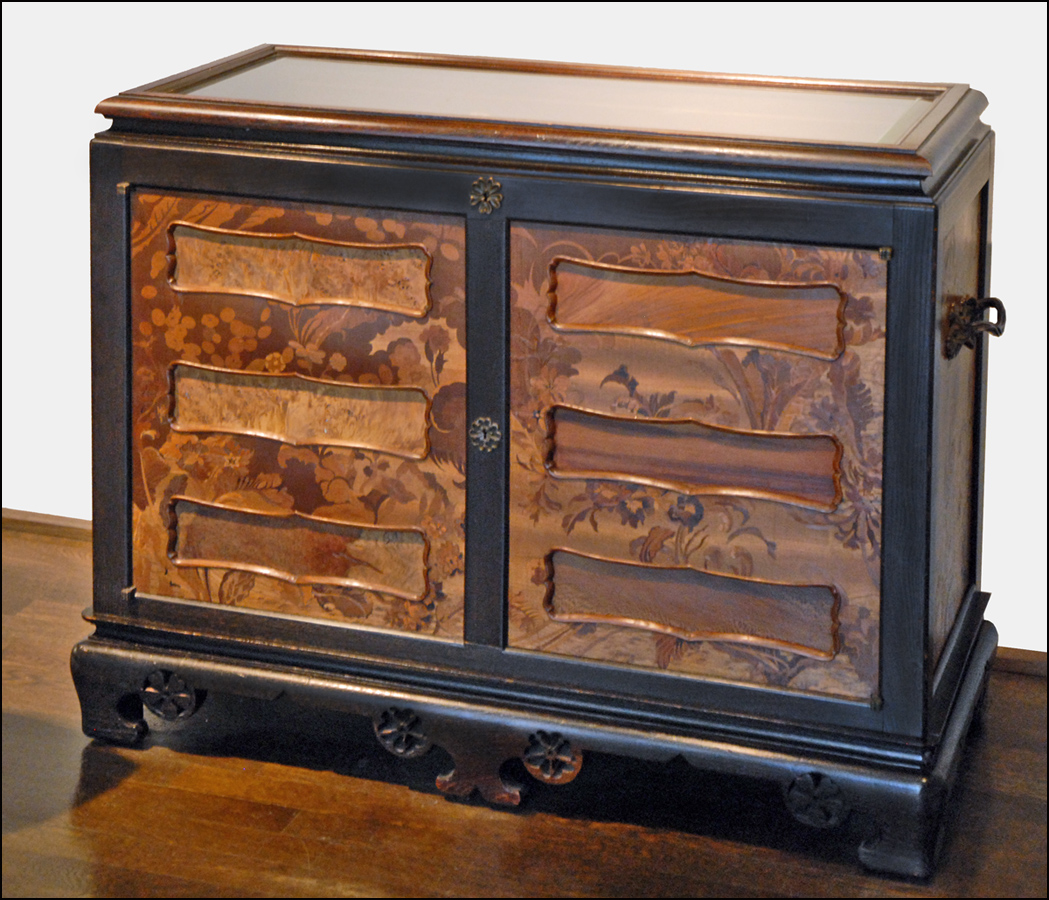
cabinet of ash wood, oak and poplar, with marquetry of colored woods and sculpted bronze, by Emile Gallé presented at the 1900 Paris Exposition (1900) (Musée des Arts Décoratifs, Paris)

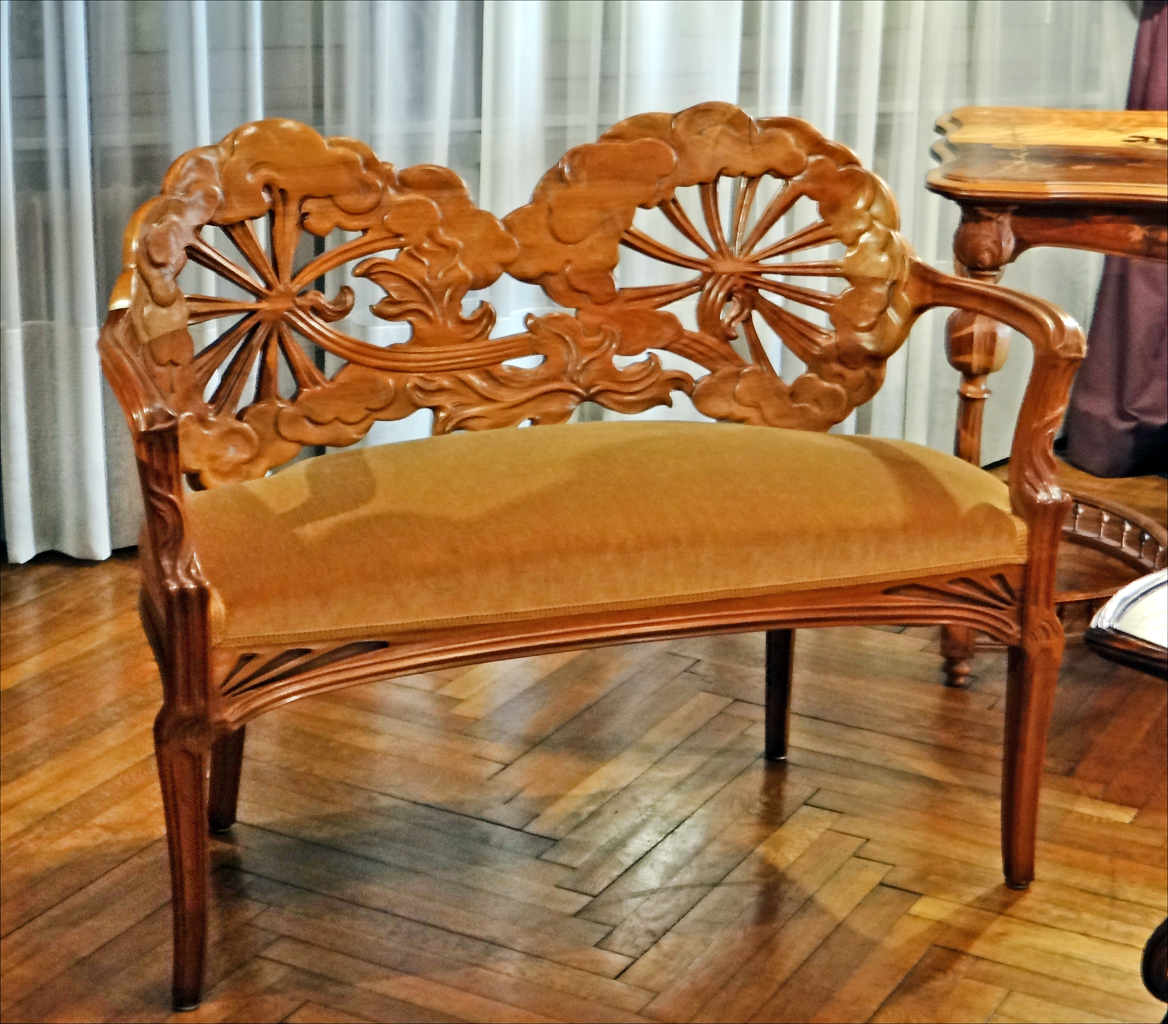
Bench by Émile Gallé, (1902)

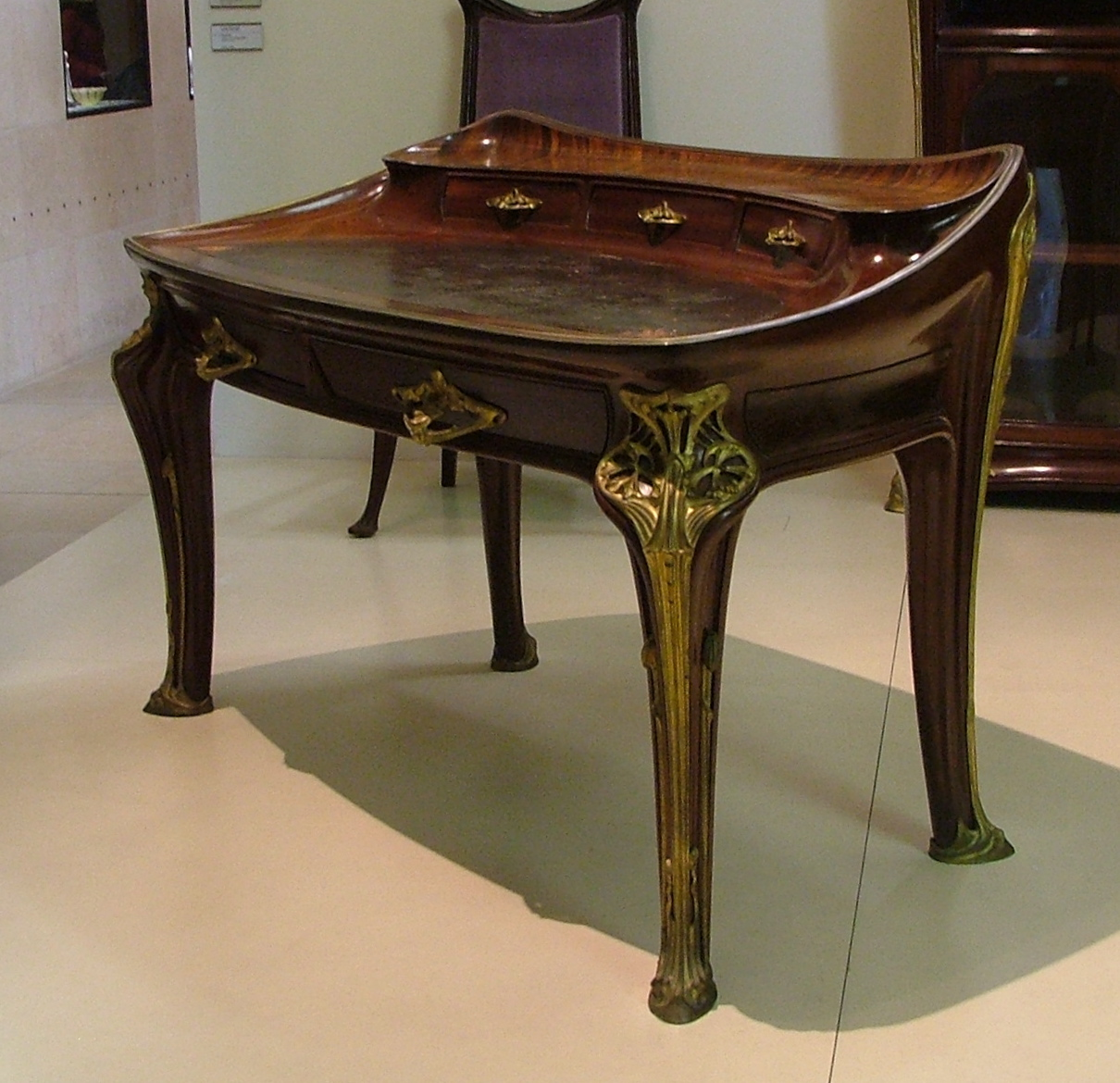
Desk by Louis Majorelle (1903–04) (Musée d'Orsay)

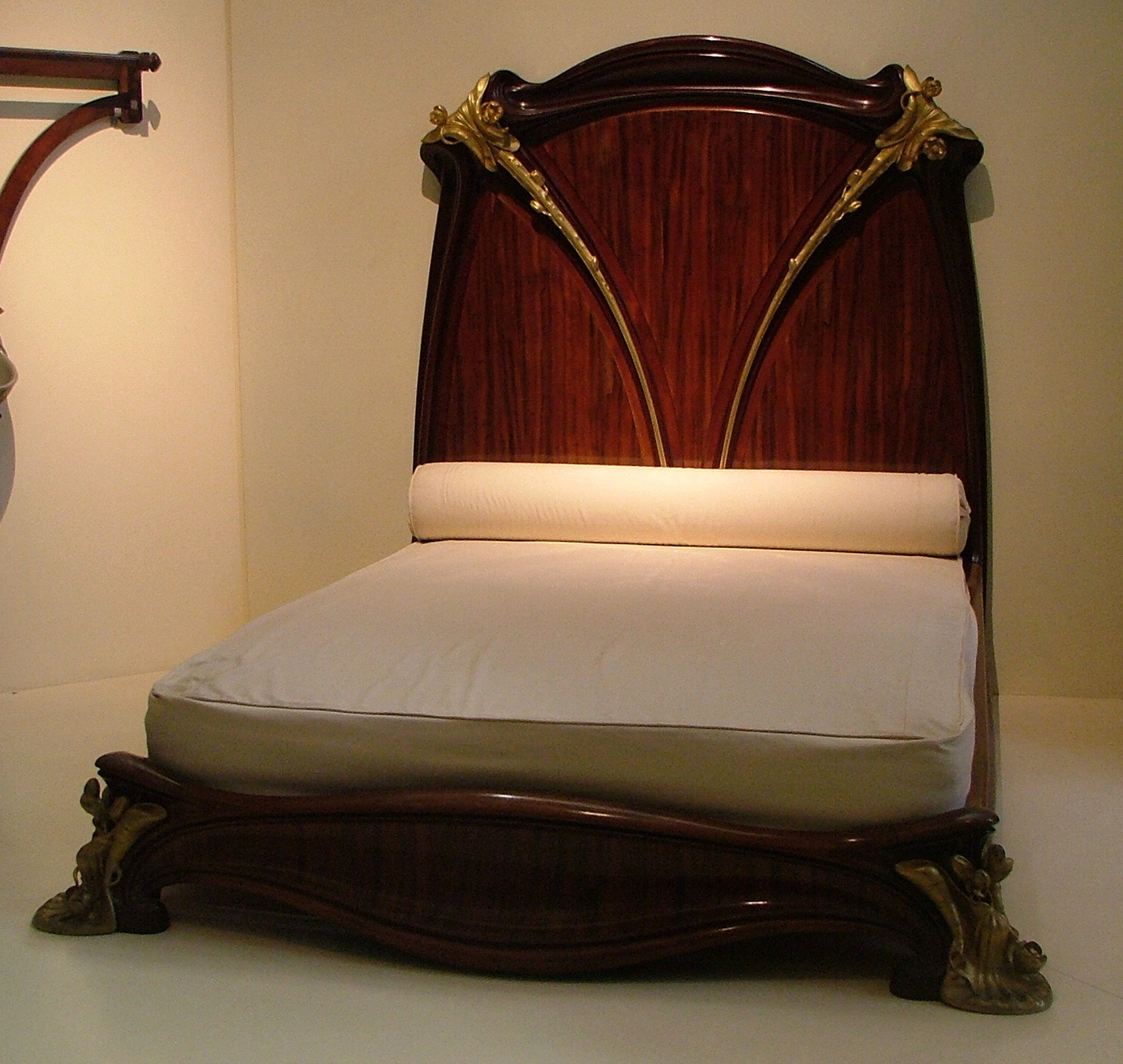
The "Water Lily" bed by Louis Majorelle (1902–1903) (Musée d'Orsay)

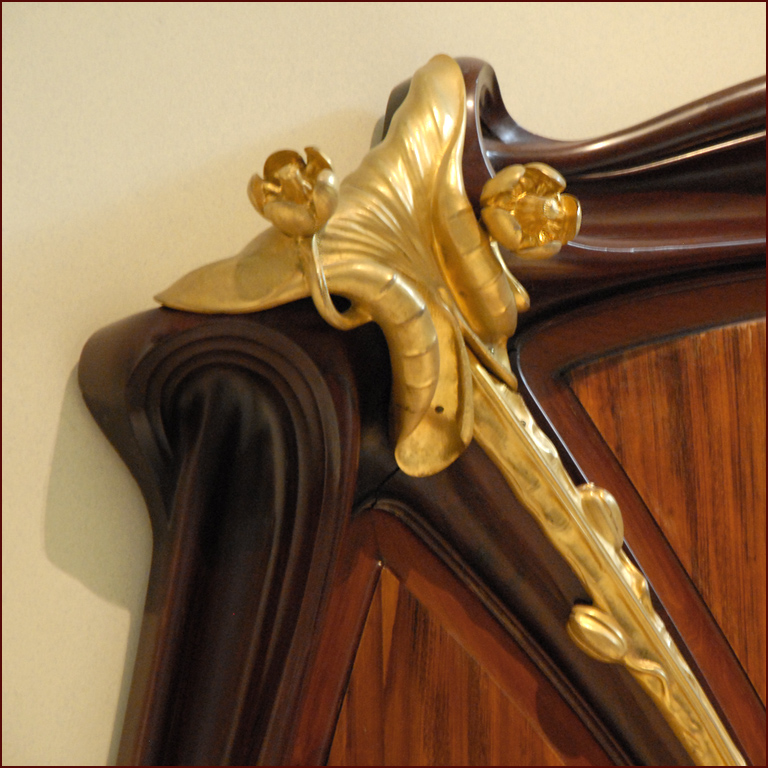
Detail of the "Water Lily" bed by Louis Majorelle

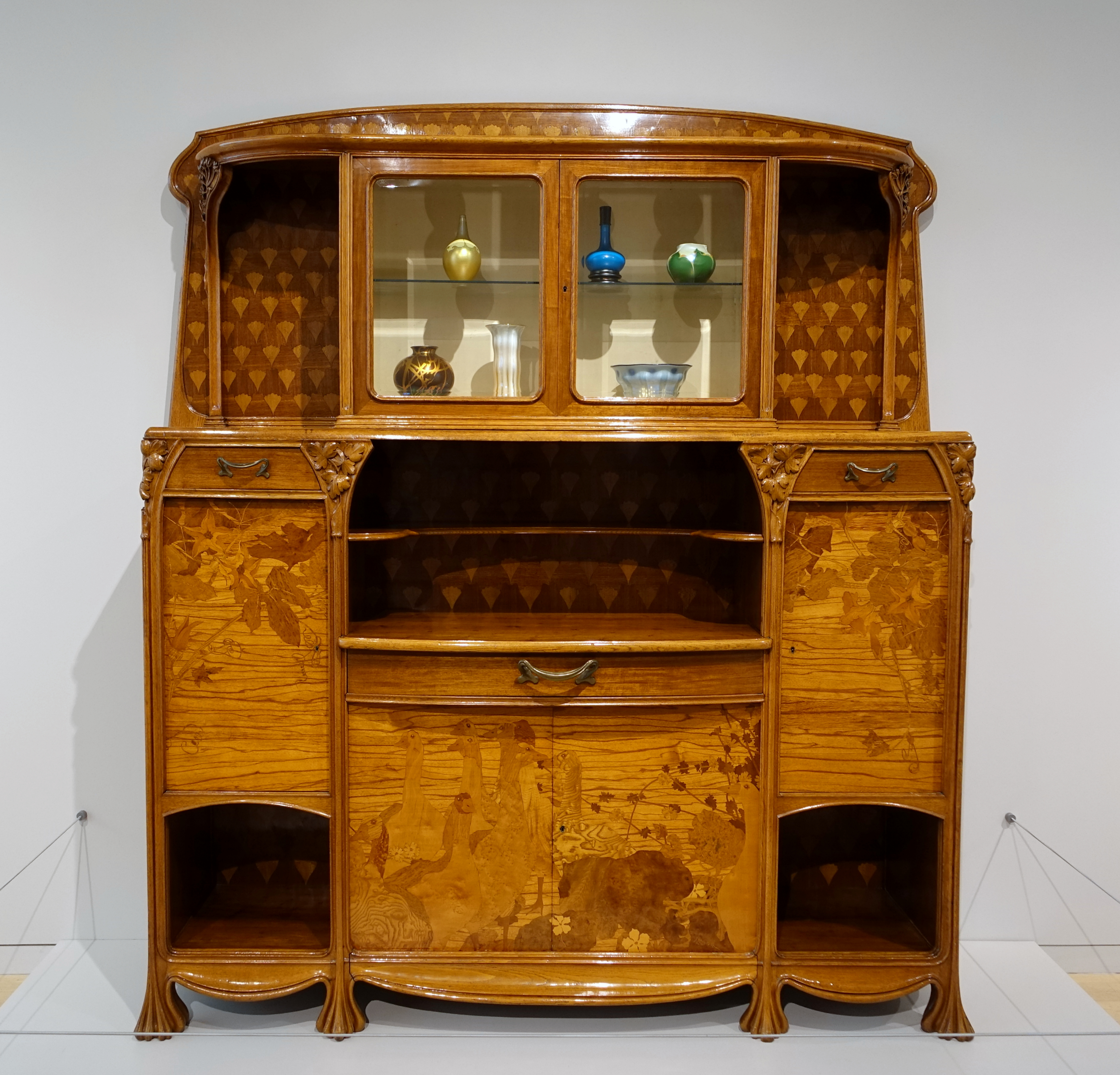
Cabinet by Louis Majorelle, with glass vases by Louis Comfort Tiffany (1900–1910) (Dallas Museum of Art)

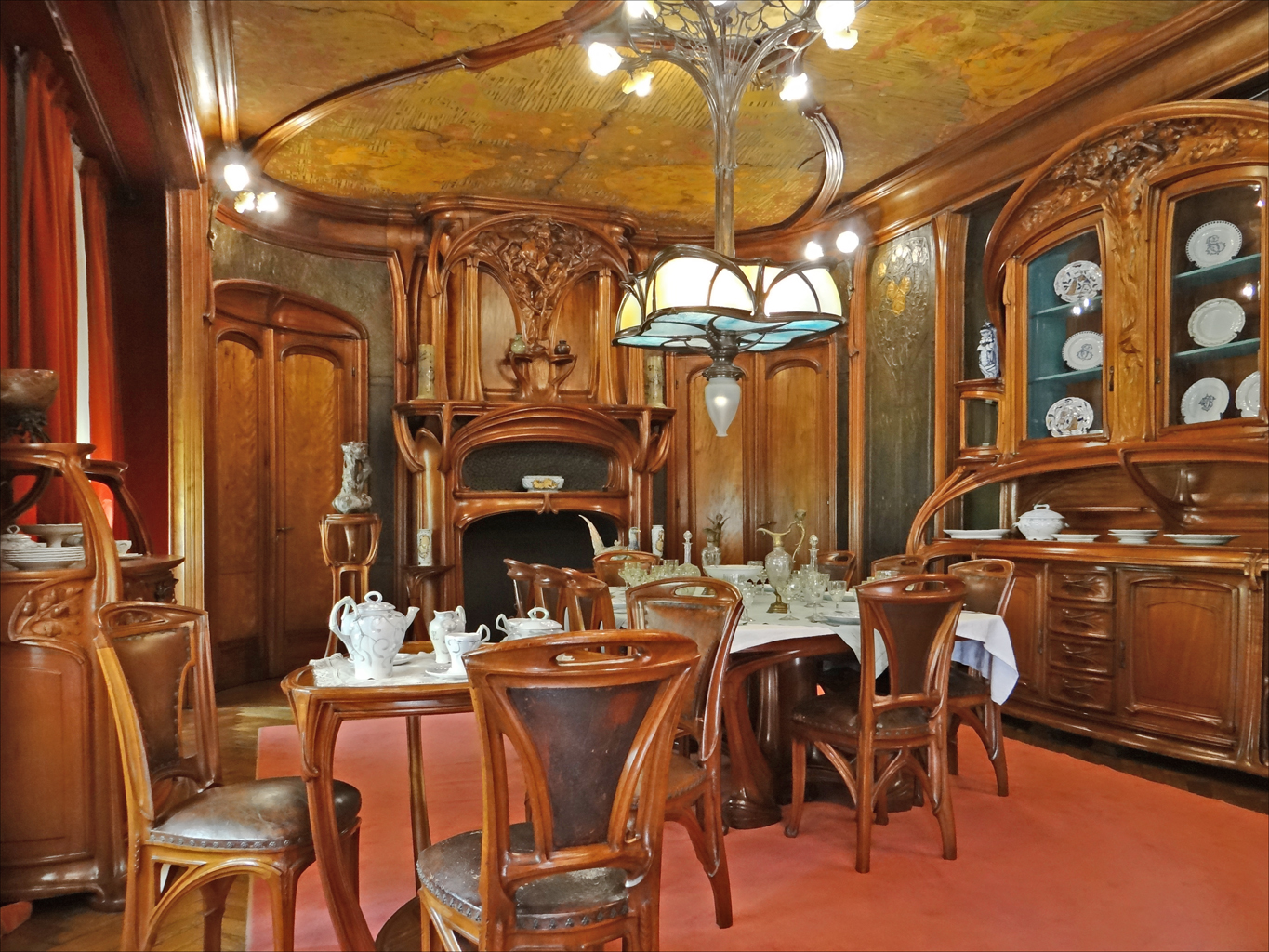
Dining room by architect Eugène Vallin and furniture designer Victor Prouvé (1903–1906) (Musée de l'Ecole de Nancy)

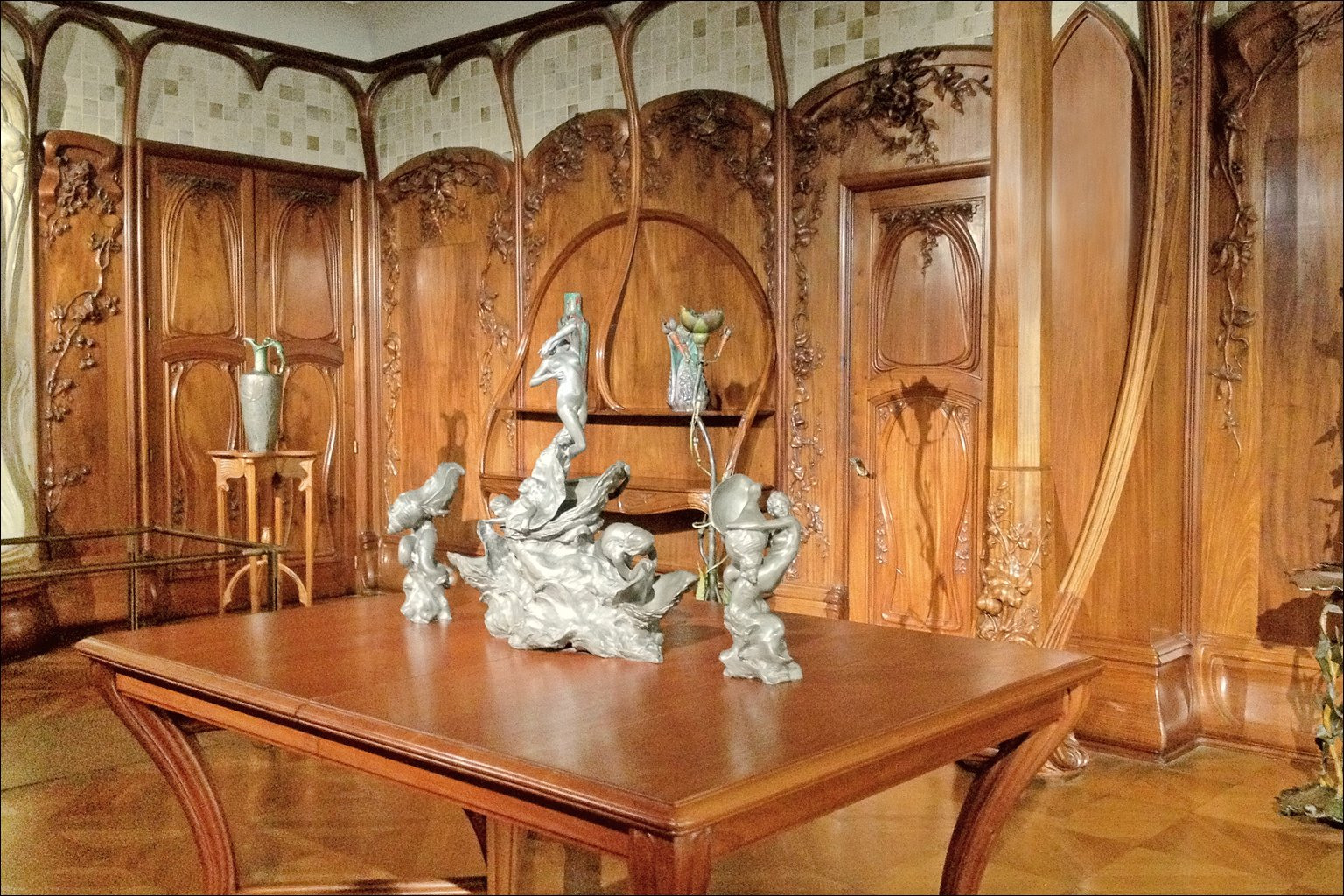
Salon by Alexandre Charpentier combining carved woodwork, furniture and sculpture into a unified work of art (1901) (Musée d'Orsay)

Unlike furniture made by the British Arts and Crafts movement, from which it emerged in stylistic respects, most Art Nouveau furniture was produced in factories by normal manufacturing techniques, which led to tensions with Arts and Crafts figures in England, who criticised continental Art Nouveau furniture for not being "honestly" constructed. It also tended to be expensive, as a fine finish, usually polished or varnished, was regarded as essential, and continental designs were usually very complex, with curving shapes that were expensive to make. France and Belgium furniture designers took up the style with more enthusiasm than those of most countries.

Several notable designers were architects who designed furniture for specific buildings they had also designed, a way of working inherited from the Arts and Crafts movement; these include Charles Rennie Mackintosh, Antoni Gaudí, Hector Guimard and Victor Horta. Mackintosh's furniture was relatively austere and geometrical, marked by elongated dimensions and right-angles. Continental designs were much more elaborate, often using curved shapes both in the basic shapes of the piece, and in applied decorative motifs.

== Germany – the Jugendstil and the Deutscher Werkebund ==
In Germany, the furniture of early designers of the Jugendstil, or "Young Style", such as Otto Eckmann displayed what was called the "floral" period of the Jugendstil. These pieces had natural curves and motifs popular in French Art Nouveau.

However, the furniture of Peter Behrens was in sharp contrast with French Art Nouveau. The influence of nature and natural motifs, such as flower stems and lily pads, the primary element of French Art Nouveau furniture, almost disappeared: this Jugendstil was rationalist, with geometric straight lines and a bare minimum of decoration. Behren's goal was exactly the opposite of French Art Nouveau; simplicity of structure and simplicity of materials, for furniture that could be inexpensive and easily mass-manufactured. He helped launch the Deutscher Werkbund, a workshop of artists in Munich to produce the new designs. At various times several leading modernists, including Ludwig Mies van der Rohe, Le Corbusier and Walter Gropius) worked for Behrens. He was a founder of the Darmstadt Artists' Colony, located near Munich, and became a key figure in the transition from Art Nouvau to modernism.

The Belgian designer Henry Van de Velde was already known in Germany for his early Art Nouveau designs. In 1899 he settled in Weimar, Germany, where in 1905 he established the Grand-Ducal School of Arts and Crafts, under the patronage of the Grand Duke of Weimar. It was the predecessor of the Bauhaus, the birthplace of modern architecture. Van de Velde became active in furniture design and decorative arts. In 1907 he became a founder of the Deutscher Werkbund, producing a wide variety of furniture in Weimar and other industrial cities.

Another notable Munich Jugendstil furniture designer was Bruno Paul, who became known for his rectangular, geometric style, with slight curves and no external decoration. His students also included the young future architect Ludwig Mies van der Rohe. He won recognition for his work at the Paris Universal Exposition of 1900.

The Munich artist Bernhard Pankok, known primarily as an illustrator, also created innovative furniture designs, with stylized lines that simplified the French style. His furniture and book designs also won him recognition at the 1900 Paris Exposition.

Richard Riemerschmid, a Dresden artist and designer, was another influential Munich Jugendstil and a founder of the Deutscher Werkbund. He was also known for his clean, perfectly functional pieces of furniture, with no ornament outside of their form, helping open the way to modernism. He also had a notable career as a decorative painter, becoming a prominent figure in the symbolist movement.

Other important figures included Jugendstil furniture included August Endell, Theodor Fischer, Otto Eckmann, and the Austrian Joseph Maria Olbrich.

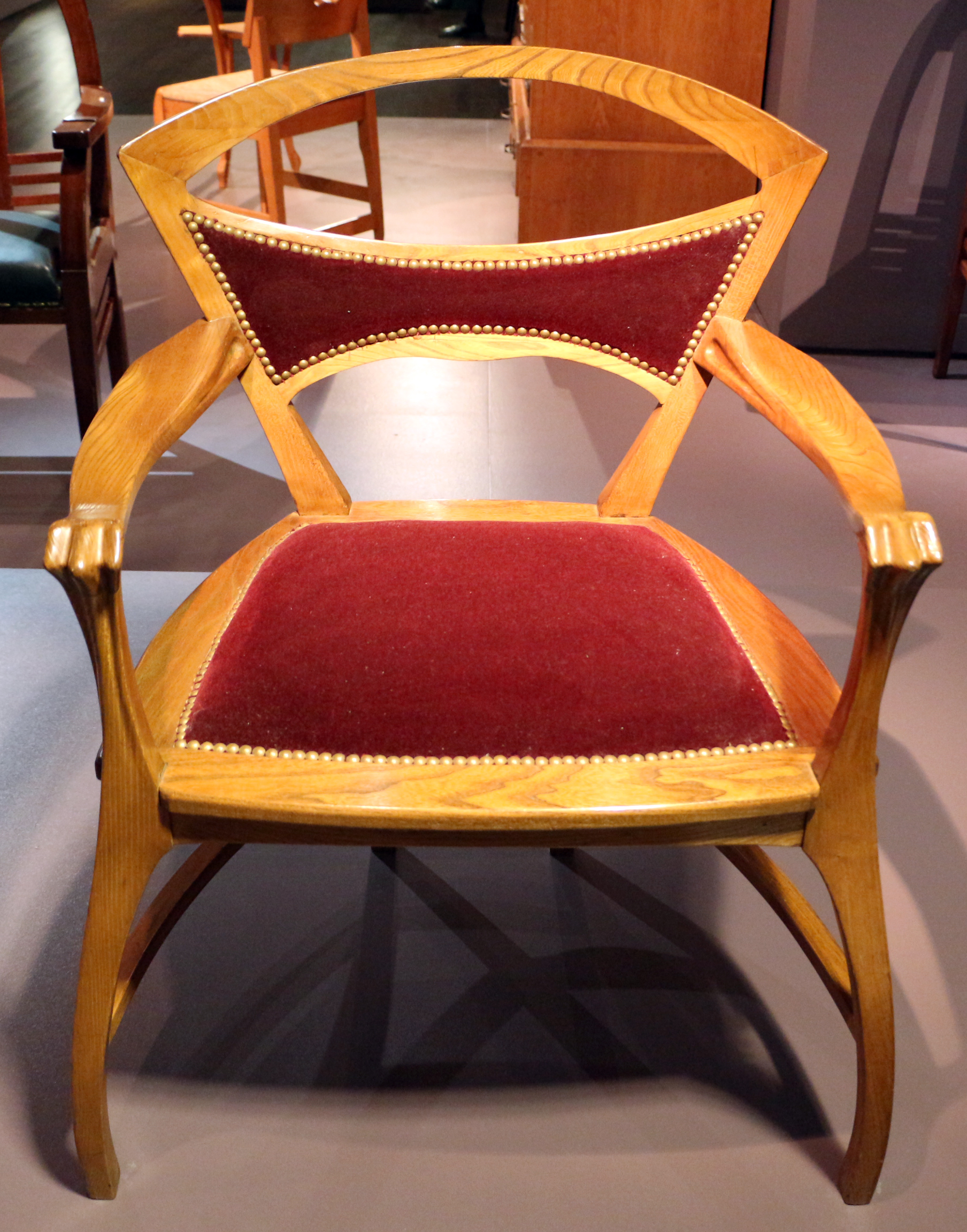
Chair by Bruno Paul (1900)

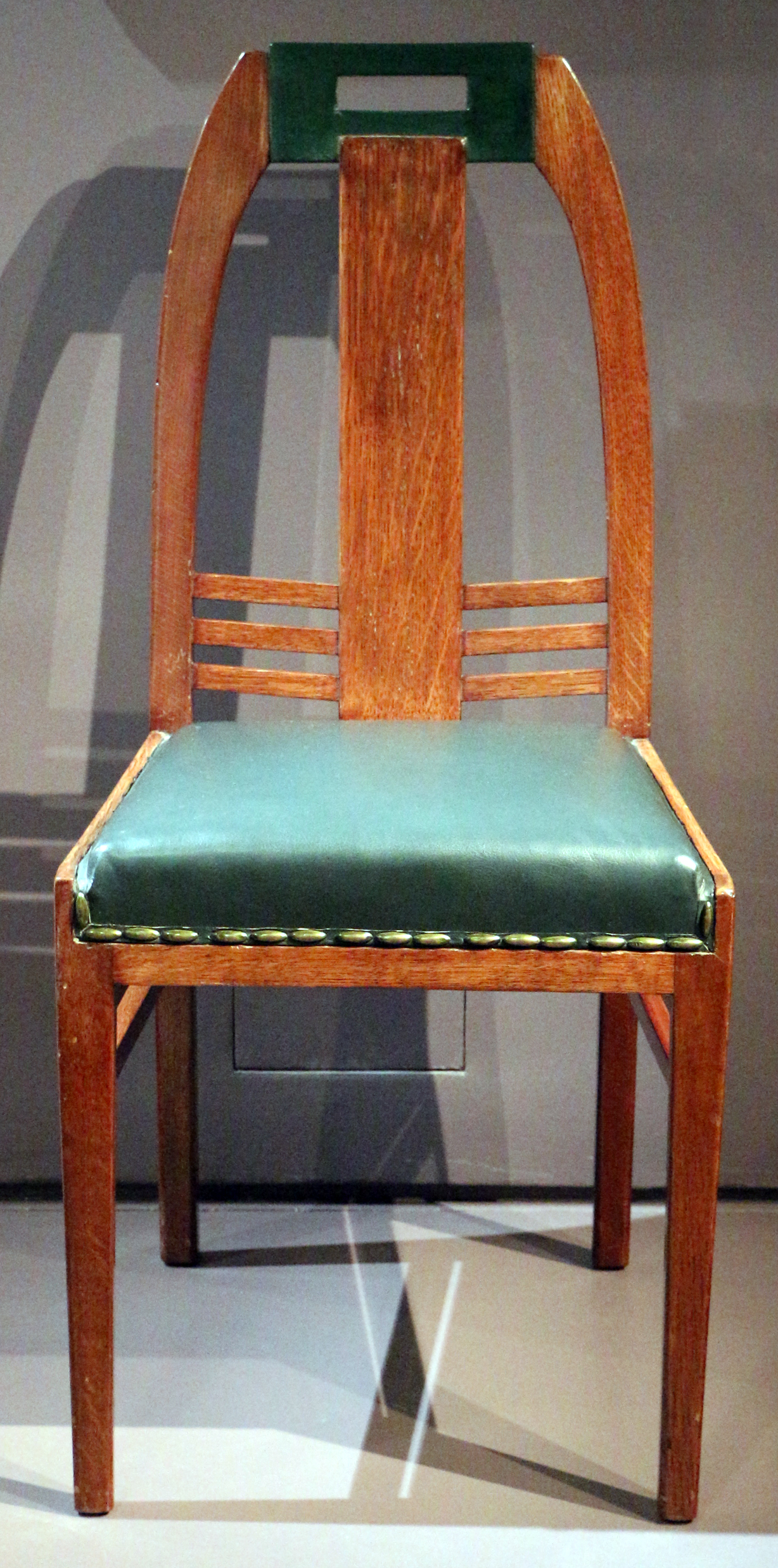
Chair by Peter Behrens (1902)

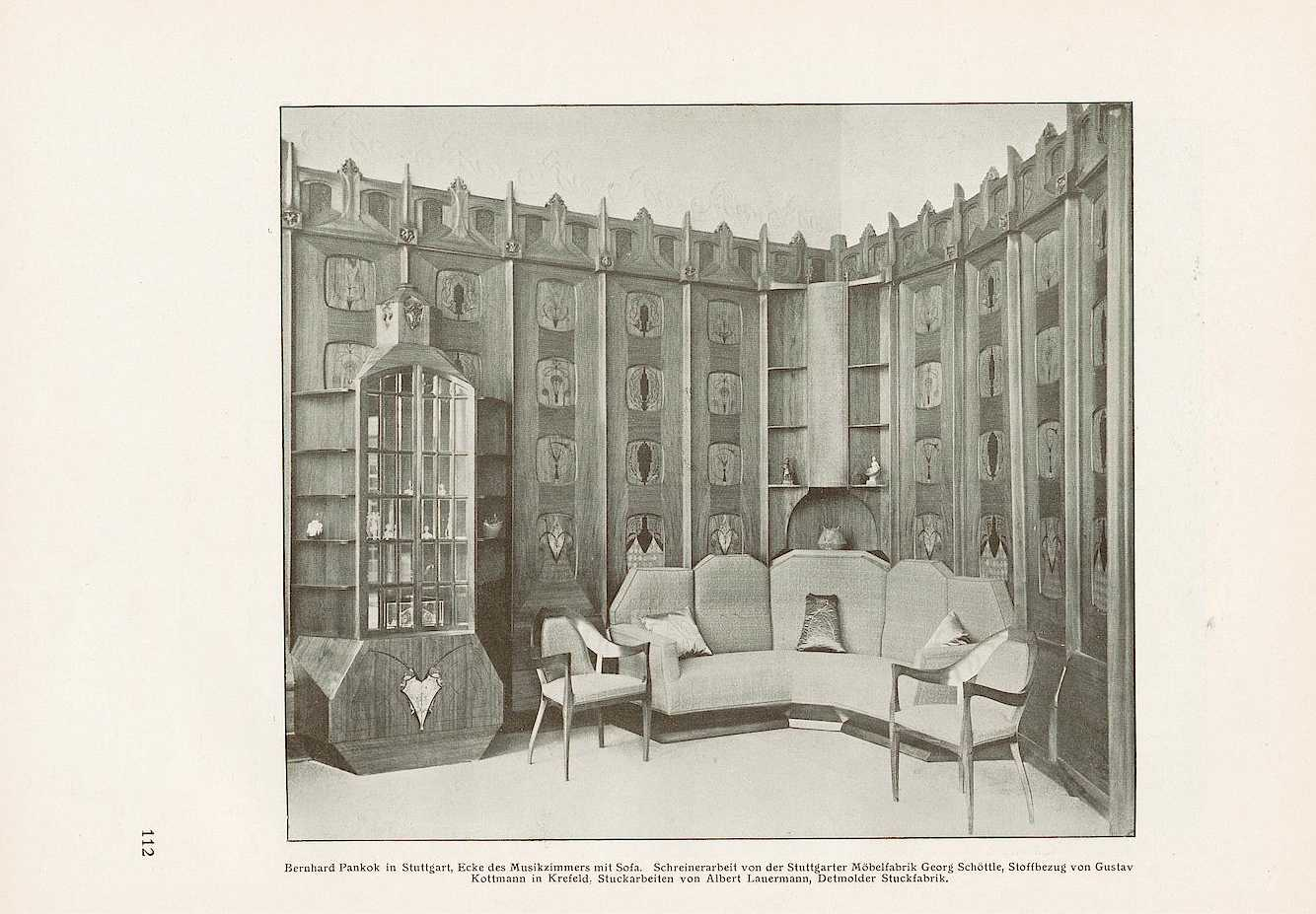
Salon furniture designed by Bernhard Pankok shown at Stuttgart Exposition (1904–1905)

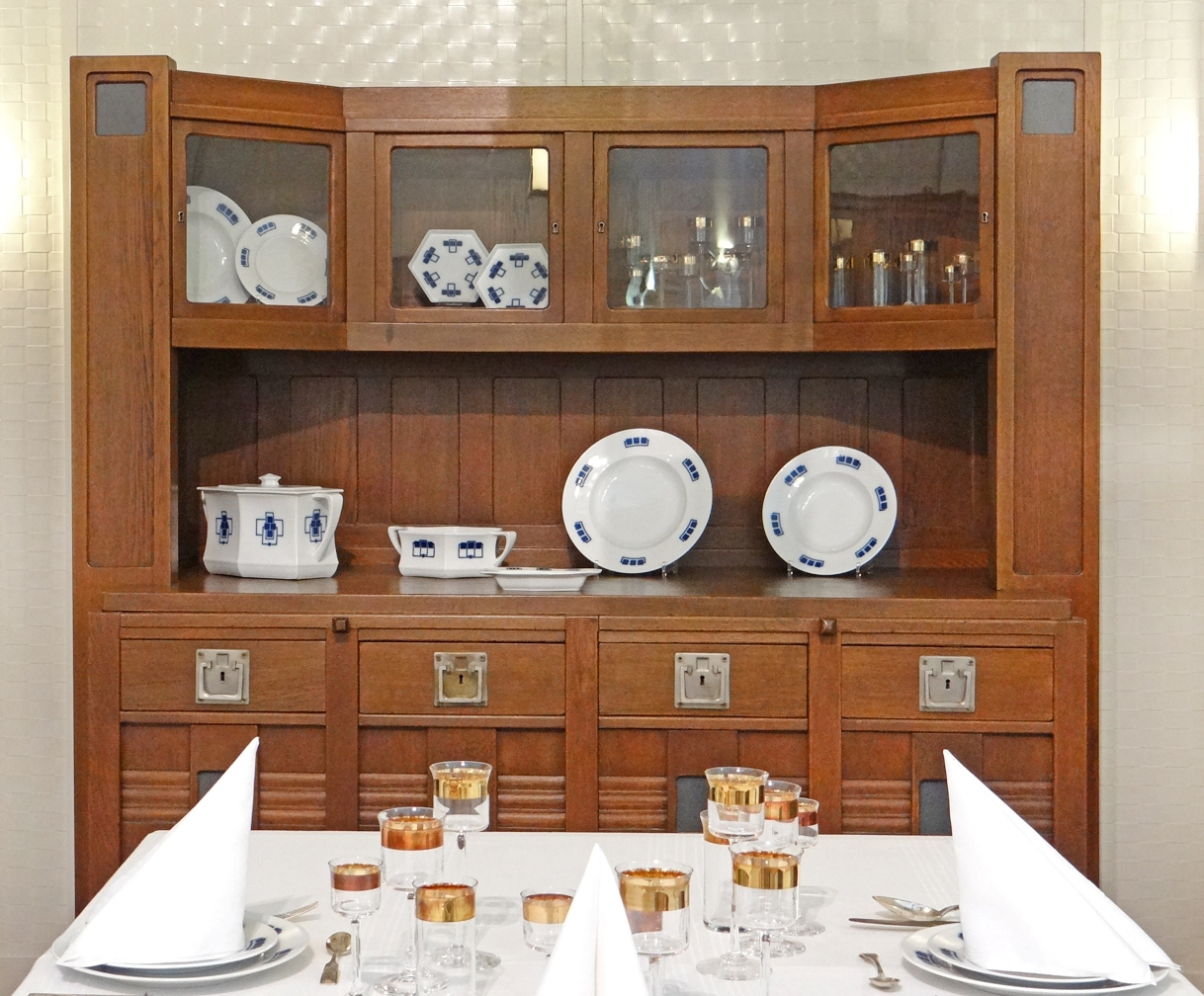
Dining room furniture at Darmstadt Artist's Colony by Peter Behrens

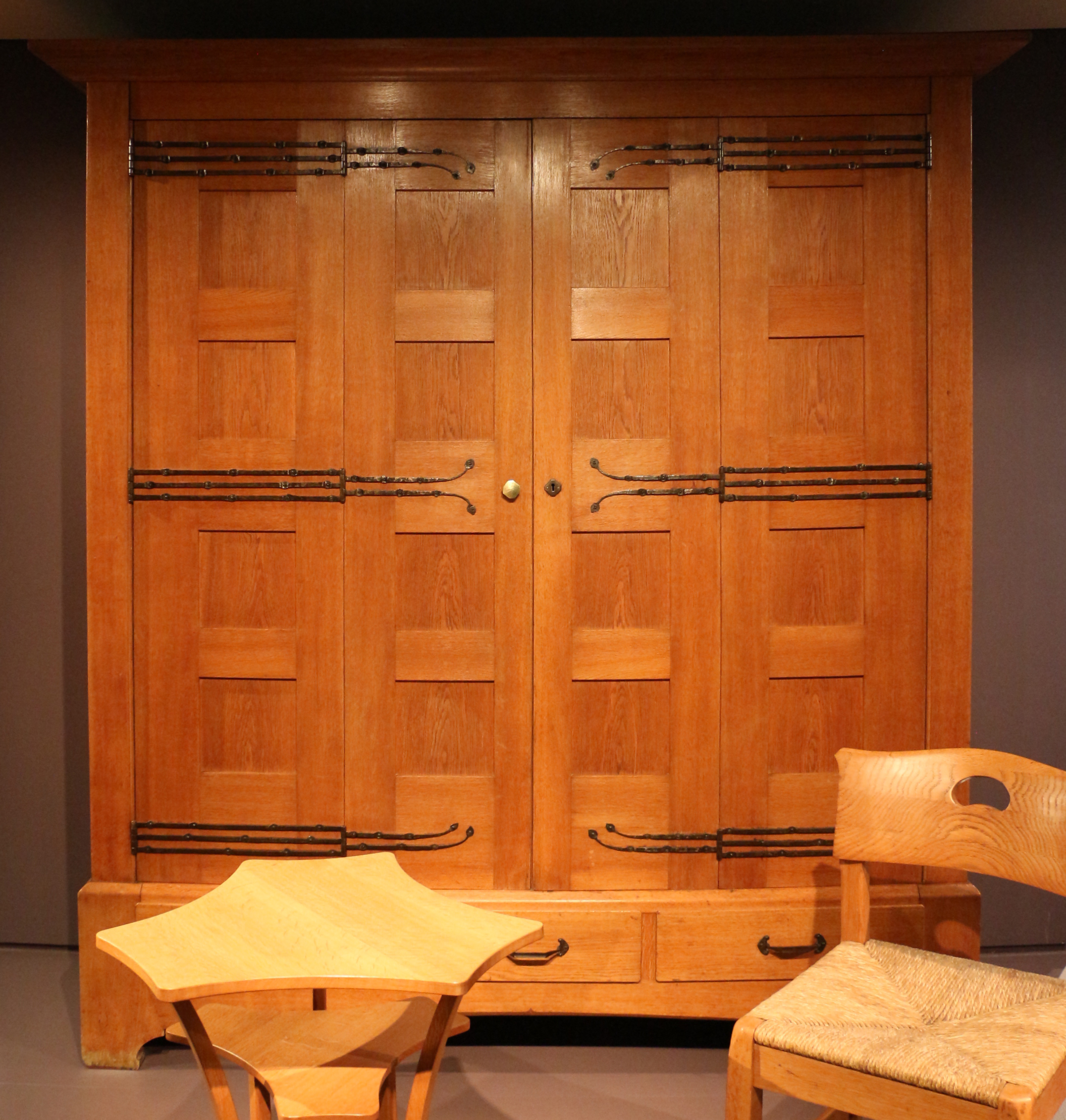
Dresser by Richard Riemerschmid (1902)

== Britain – Arts and Crafts and the Glasgow School ==
In Britain, the Arts and Crafts movement, launched early in the 1880s, had advocated finely crafted, hand-made furniture, in a reaction against factory-made mass-produced furniture. By the 1890s Glasgow was a major seaport and prosperous industrial center, and it aspired to have a distinct cultural identity. Two former students of the Glasgow School of Art, the designers Charles Rennie Mackintosh and his wife, Margaret Macdonald Mackintosh, helped establish that identity. The furniture Mackintosh designed was inspired by Arts and Crafts, austere and geometrical, with long straight lines and right angles, to which MacIntosh and his wife added touches of Art Nouveau decoration, using painted wood, marquetry of enamel and stained glass and fabrics such as painted silk. His major project, commissioned in 1897, was a remaking of the school building and its interiors, for which the two Mackintoshes created the architecture, decoration and furniture. The furniture and decor of Willow Tea Room of the school became a popular symbol of the Glasgow style; it influenced artists of other schools, particularly the Vienna Secession, which invited Mackintosh to exhibit his work.

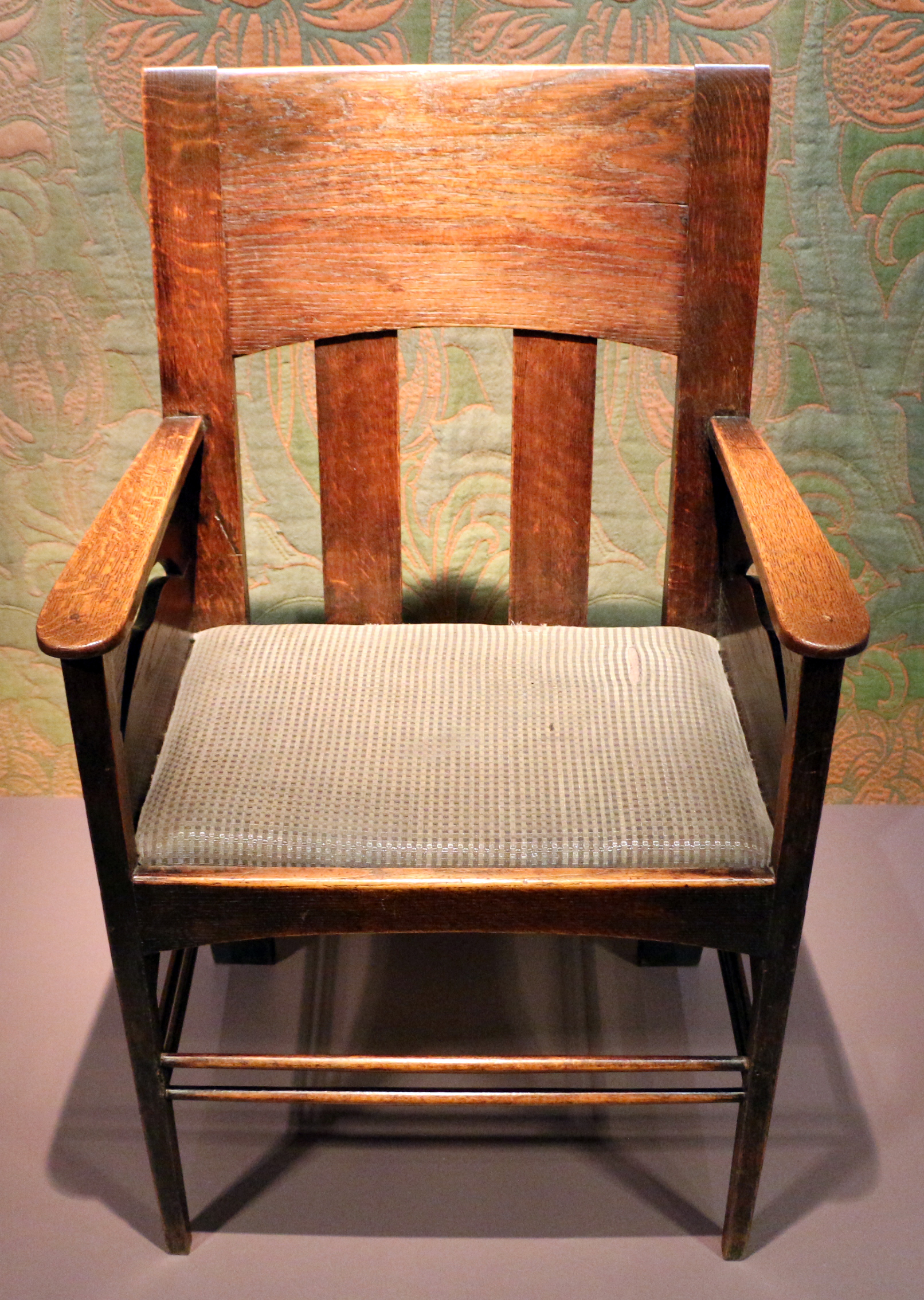
Armchair by Charles Rennie Macintosh (1897)

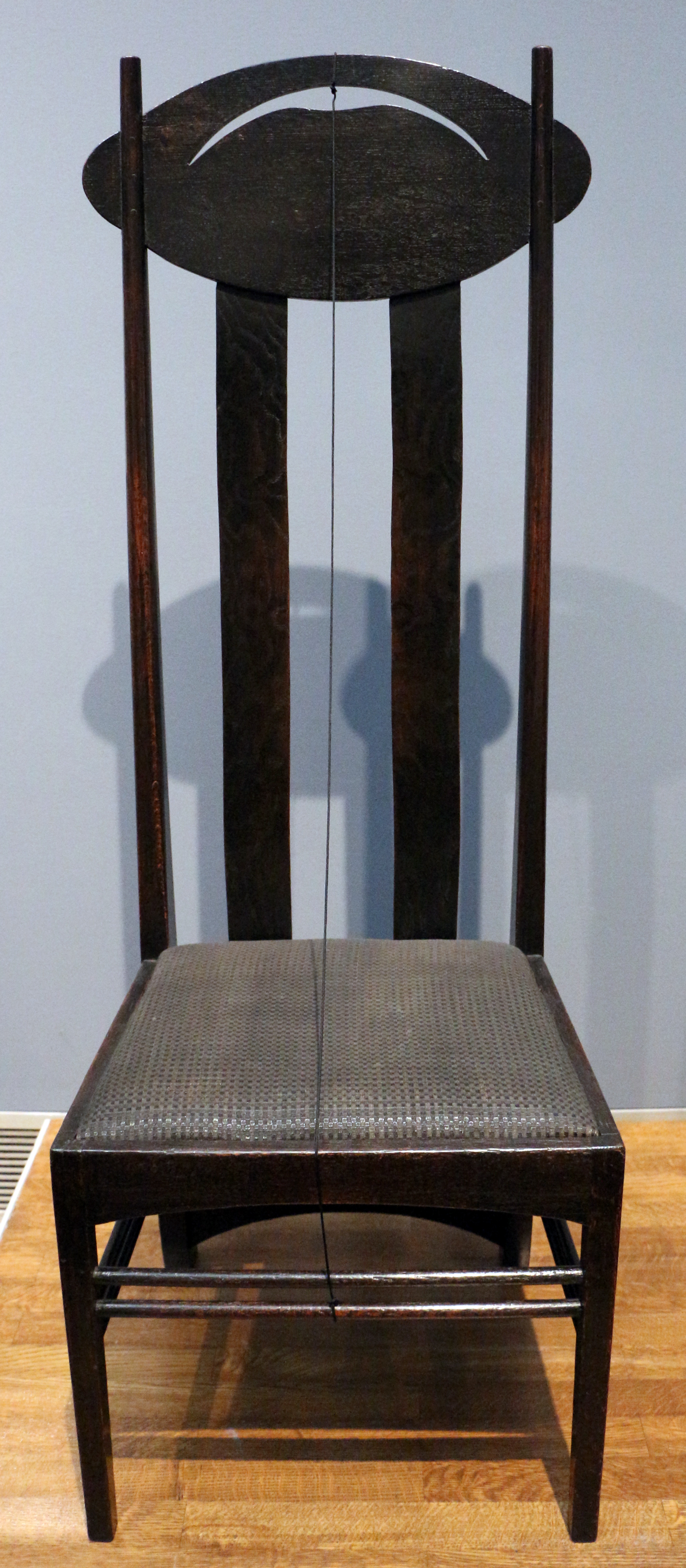
Dining room chair by Charles Rennie Mackintosh (1897)

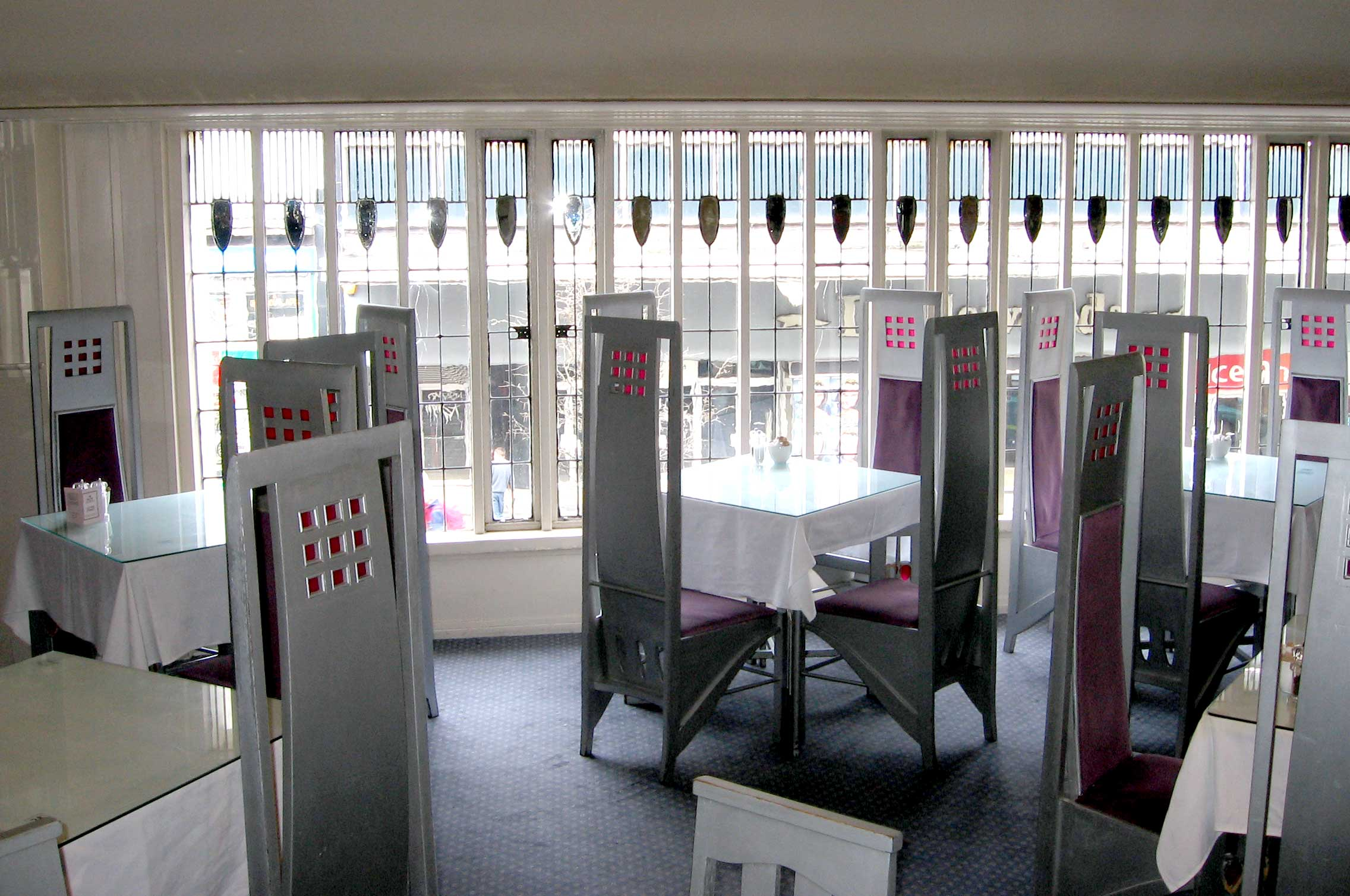
The Willow Tea Room at the Glasgow School, by Charles Rennie Mackintosh and Margaret Macdonald Mackintosh

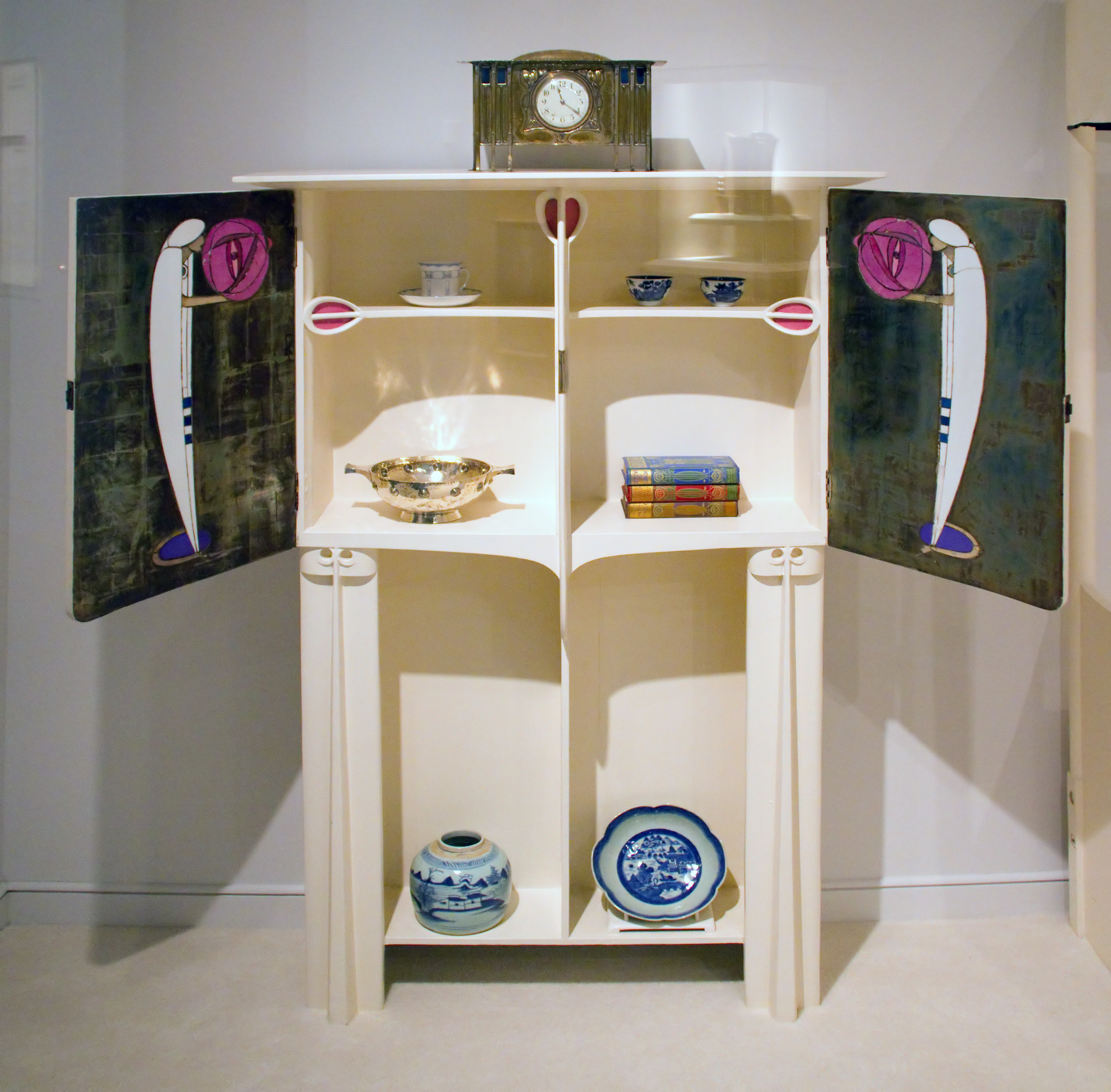
Cabinet by Charles Rennie Mackintosh and Margaret Macdonald Mackintosh

== Austria – the Vienna Secession and the Wiener Werkstätte ==
The Vienna Secession was founded on 3 April 1897 by artist Gustav Klimt, designer Koloman Moser, architects Josef Hoffmann and Joseph Maria Olbrich, and was soon joined by architect Otto Wagner. The primary features of the furniture were geometric forms, a minimum of decoration, and a break away from historic models, though it sometimes adapted features from traditional styles, particularly the Biedemeier style. Wagner's furniture was particularly modern; he was among the first to incorporate new materials such as aluminium into his furniture designs.

Josef Hoffmann was another major figure in the Secession. In 1903, along with Koloman Moser, he helped launch an even more ambitious project, the Wiener Werkstätte, an enterprise of artists and craftsmen working together to create all the elements of a complete work of art, or Gesamtkunstwerk, including furniture with very modern geometric designs. One of his most radical creations was the Sitzmachine adjustable-back chair, created in 1905.

Hoffmann's method was to produce a "total work of art". He introduced similar and harmonized motifs, especially squares and cubes, into the metal, glass, jewellery, leather, textiles, and furniture. His timing was perfectly in sync with the transition from Art Nouveau to Modernism. He introduced the Kubus armchair in 1910, just as the first major works of cubism by Picasso and Georges Braque appeared in Paris.

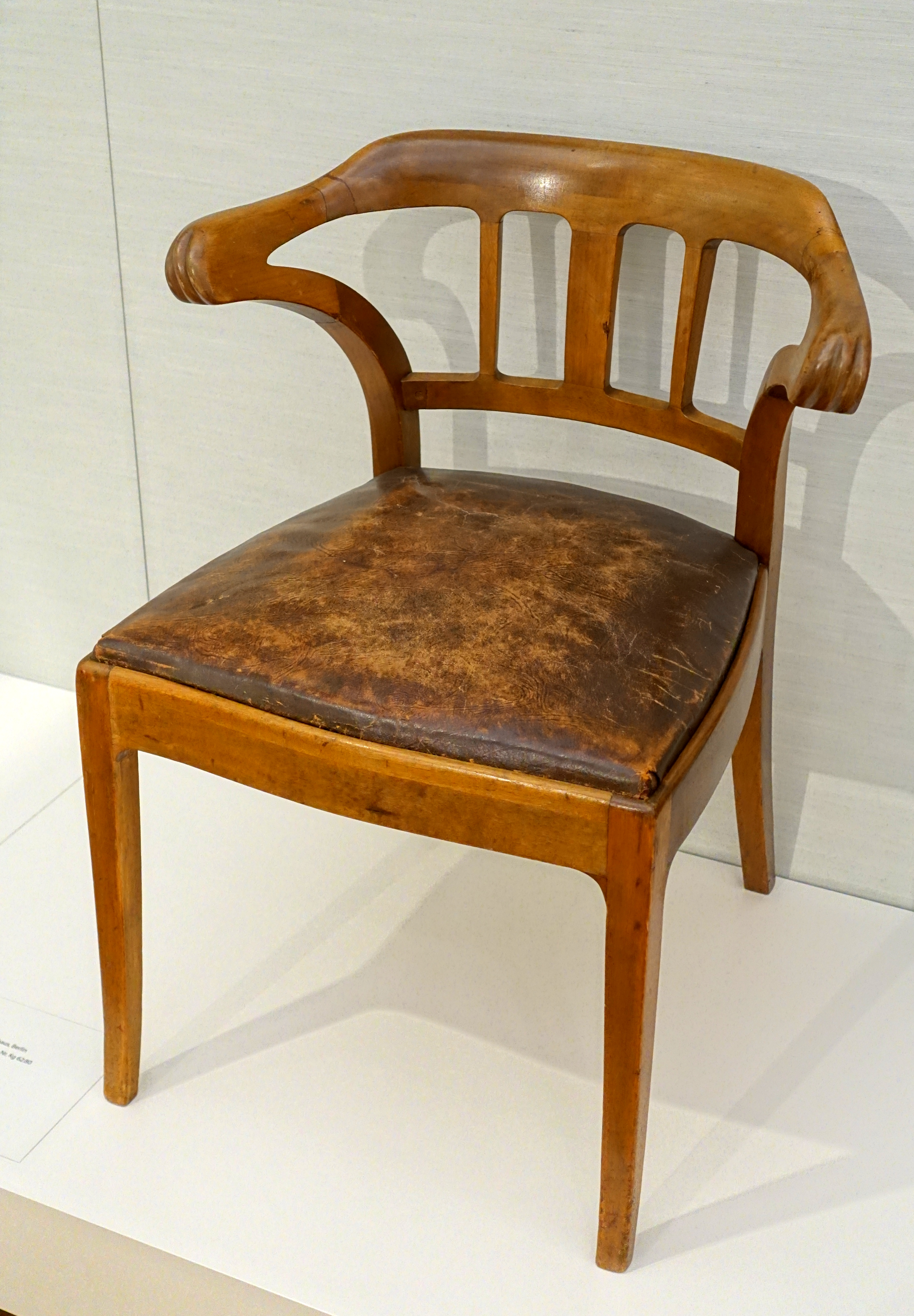
Maple wood and leather armchair by Otto Eckmann (1898)

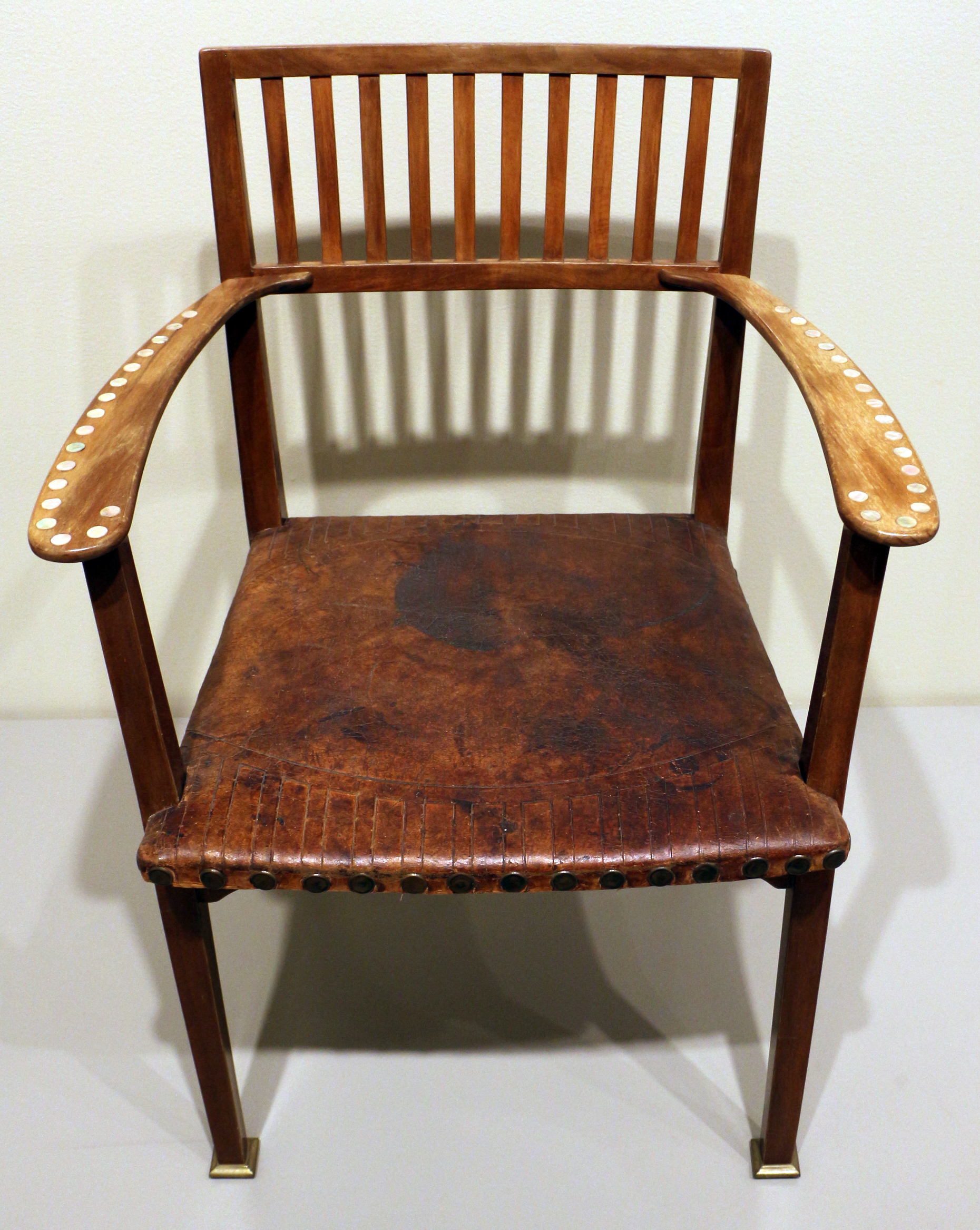
Wagner armchair (1898–99) (Art Institute of Chicago)

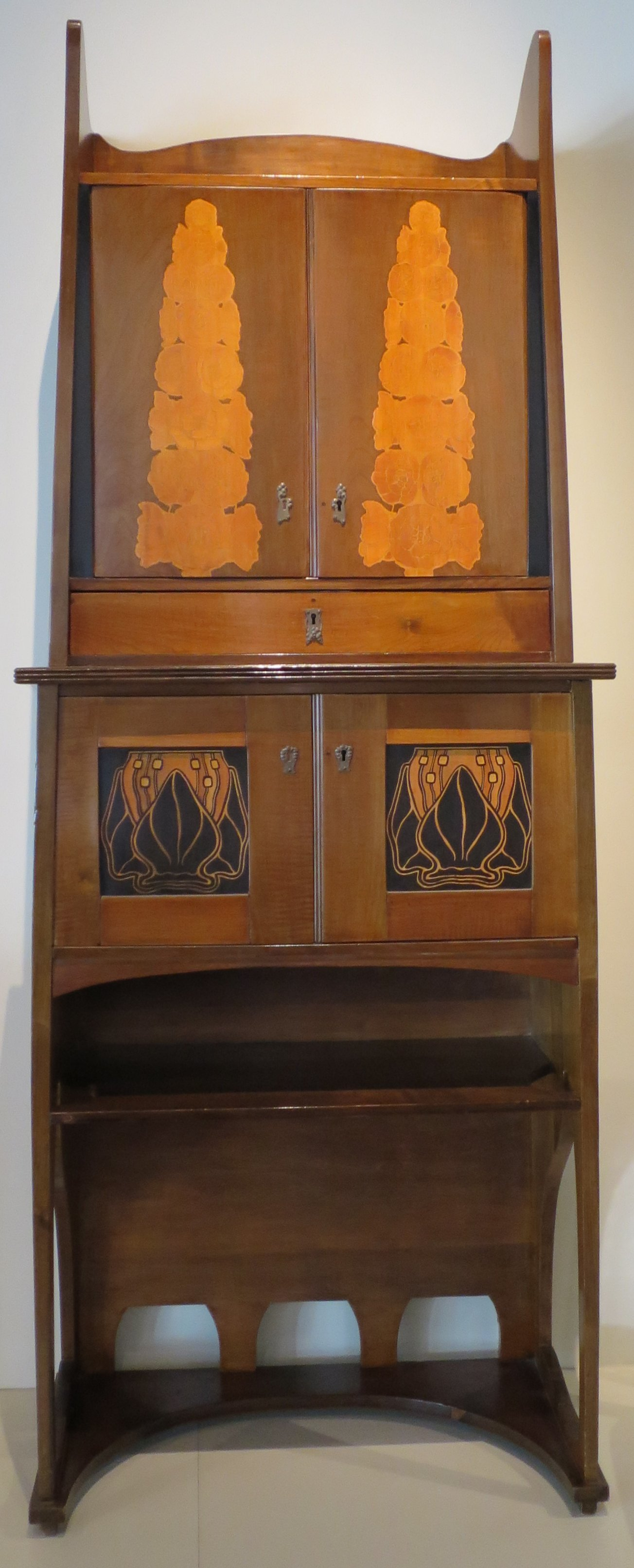
Pillar cabinet made by Joseph Maria Olbrich (1900)

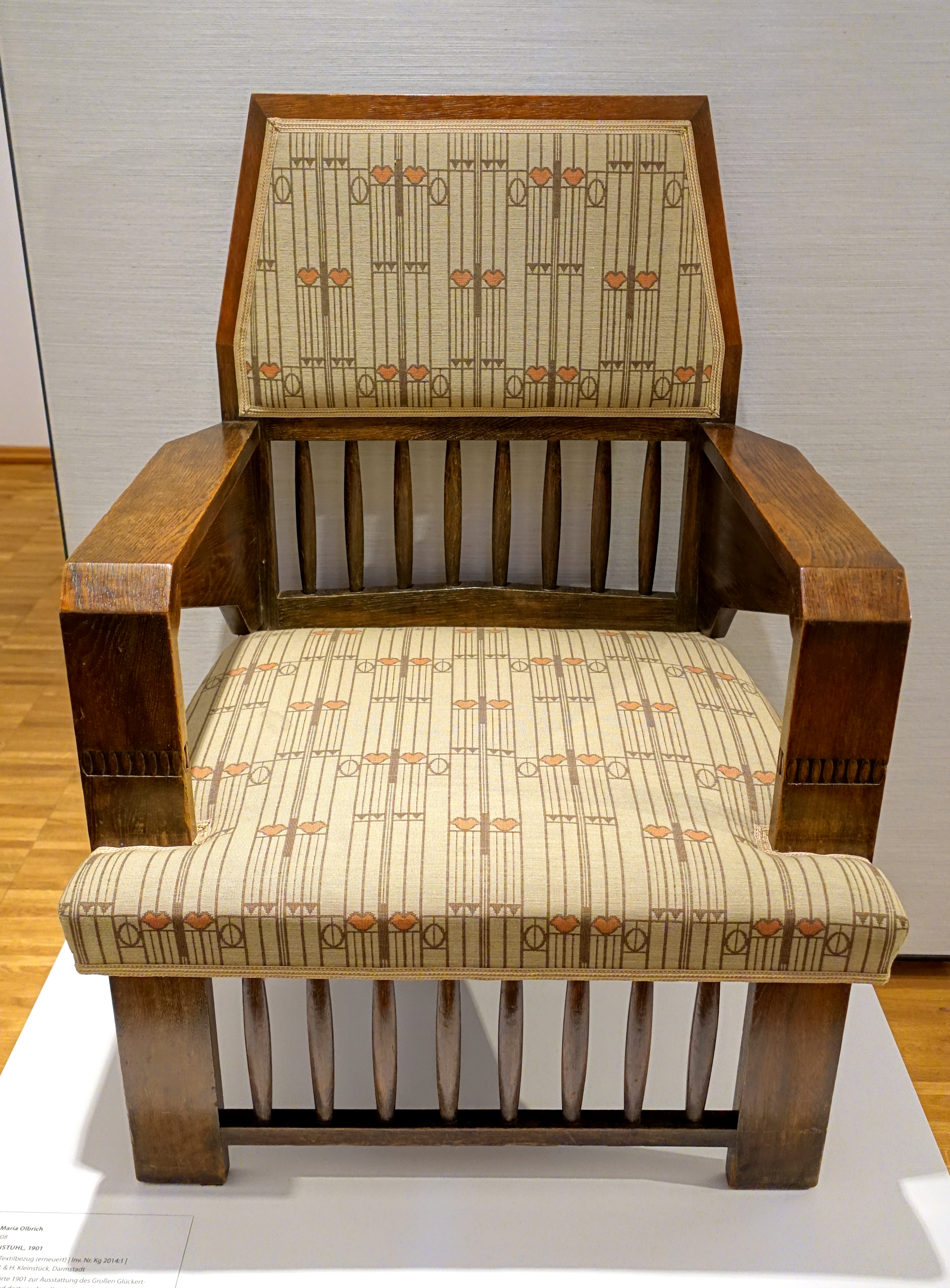
Armchair by Joseph Maria Olbrich, oak and textile, (1901) (Darmstadt Museum)

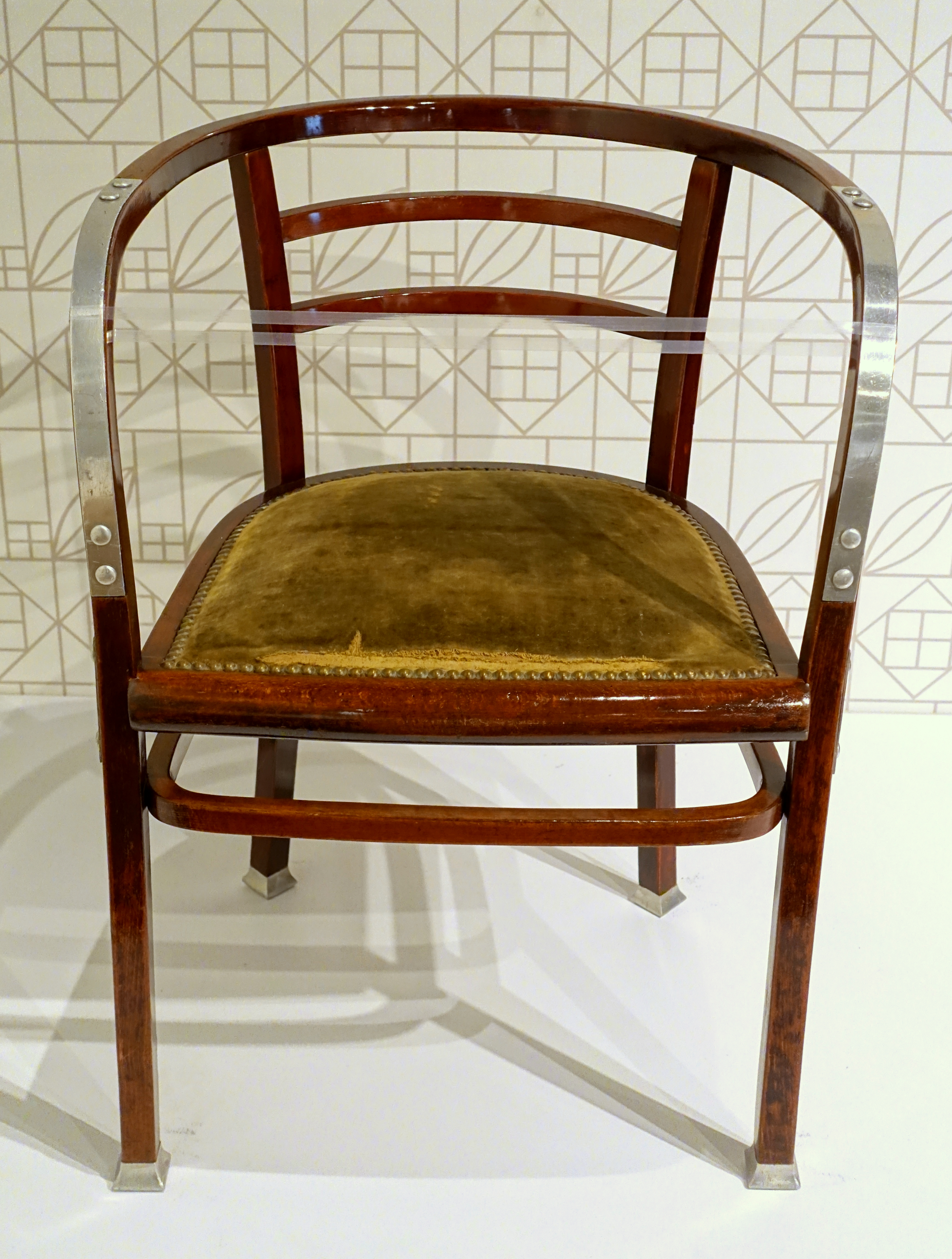
Armchair designed by Otto Wagner and made by Gebruder Thonet (1905–1906), of beechwood, aluminum, and cane under the upholstery (Montreal Museum of Fine Arts)

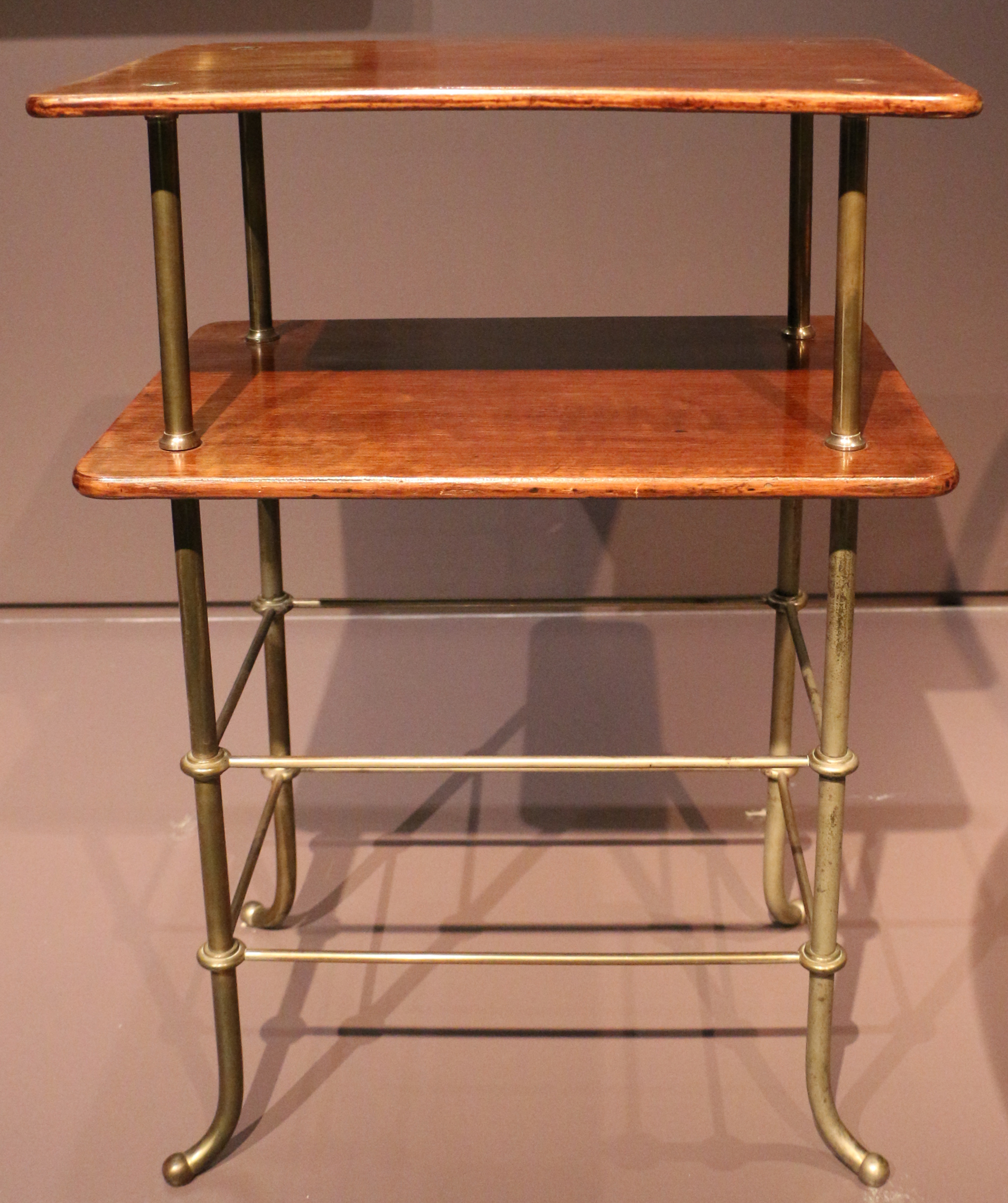
Portable table by Otto Wagner made for his villa (1904)

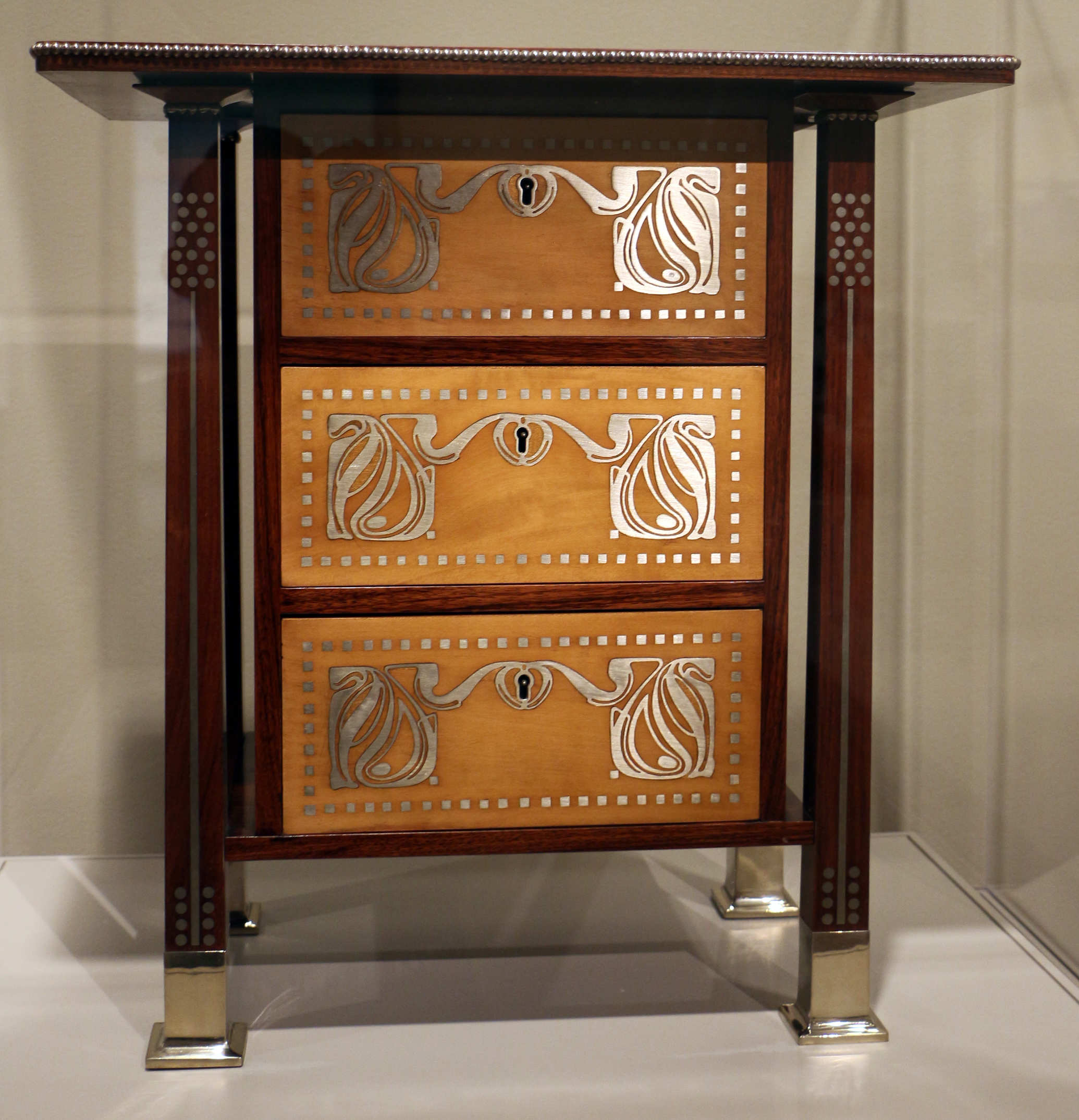
Cabinet for photographs by Josef Hoffmann (circa 1902)

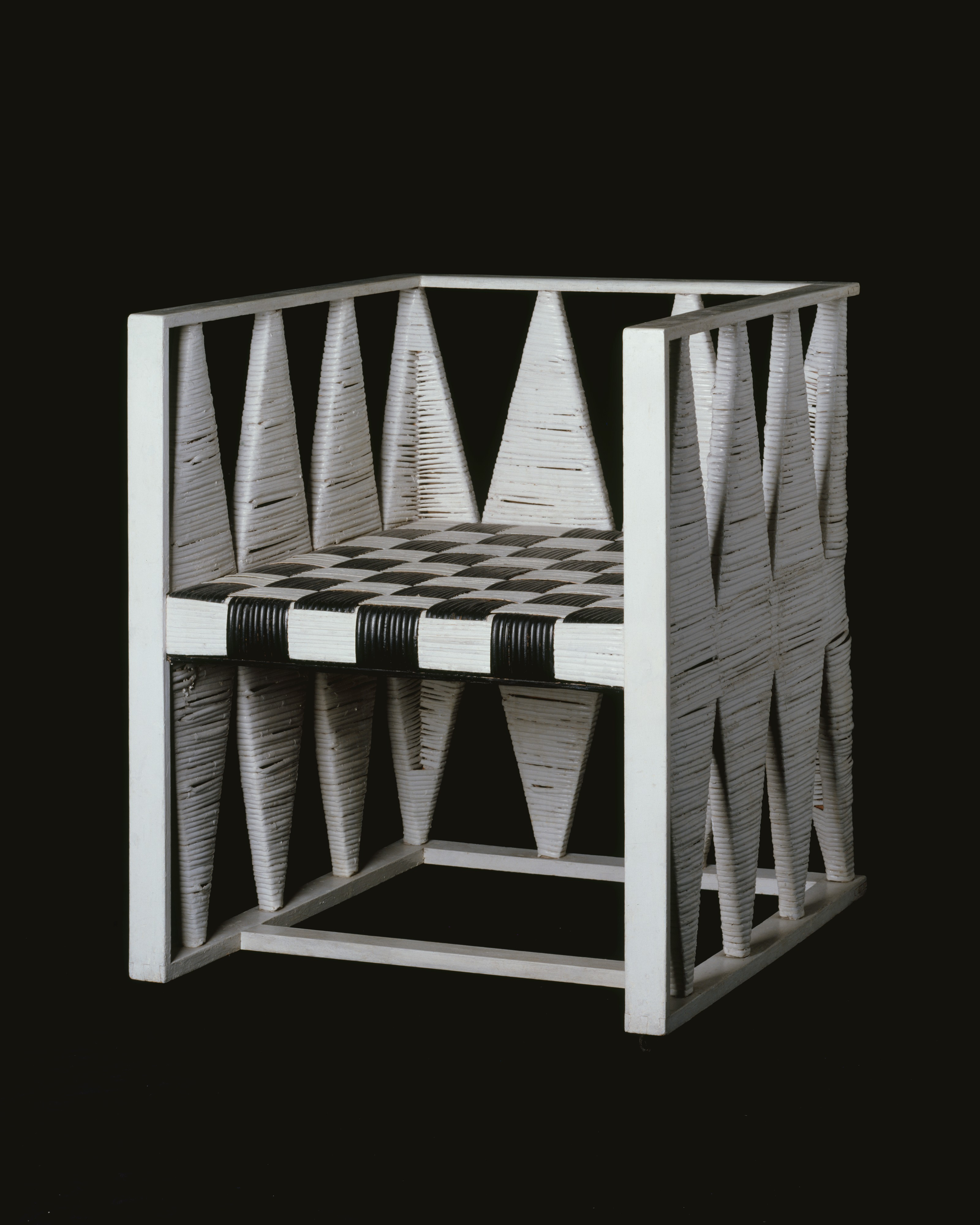
Armchair of wood and cane (1903), Josef Hoffmann and Koloman Moser (Metropolitan Museum of Art)

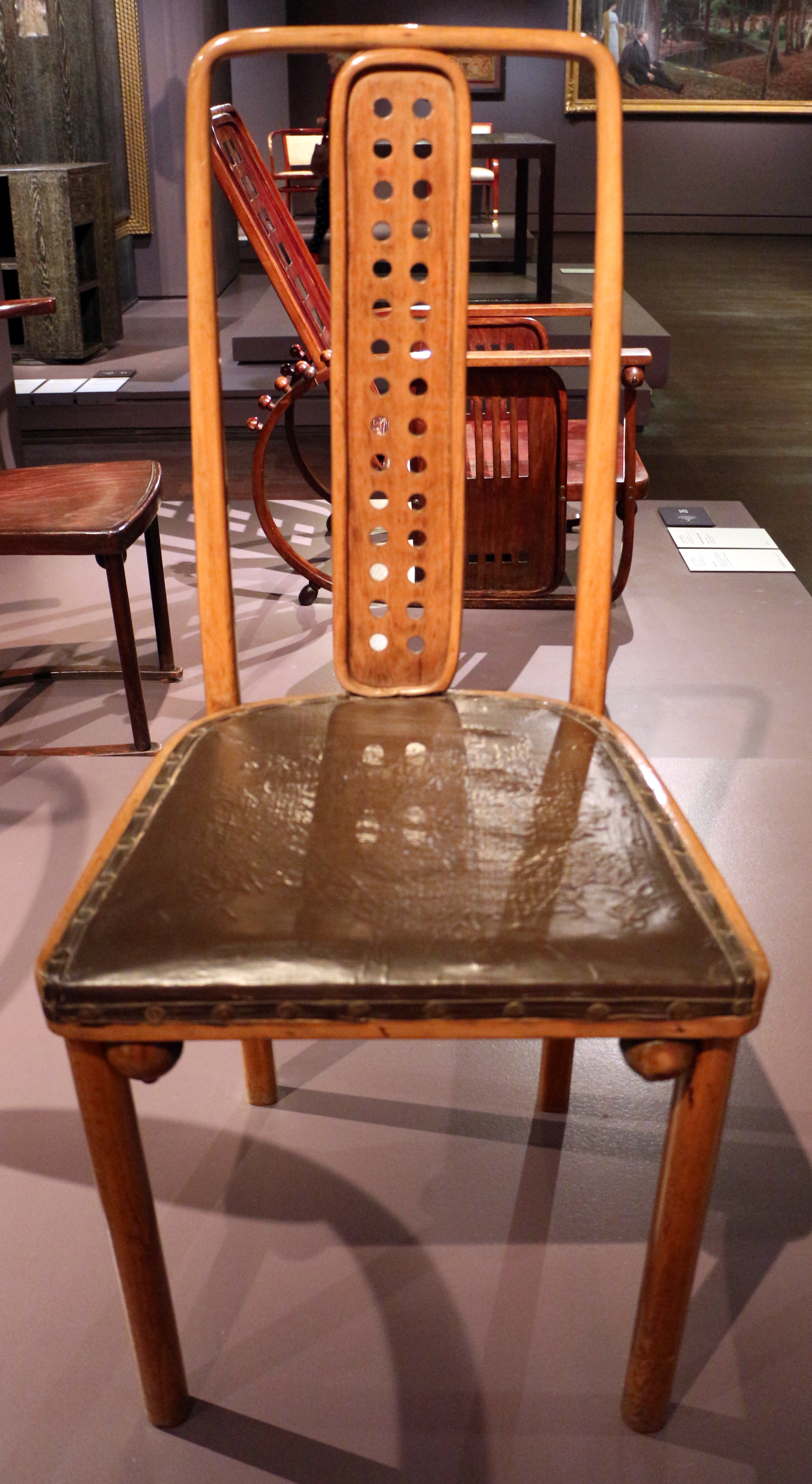
Chair for the Pürkesdorf Sanatarium (1904–05)

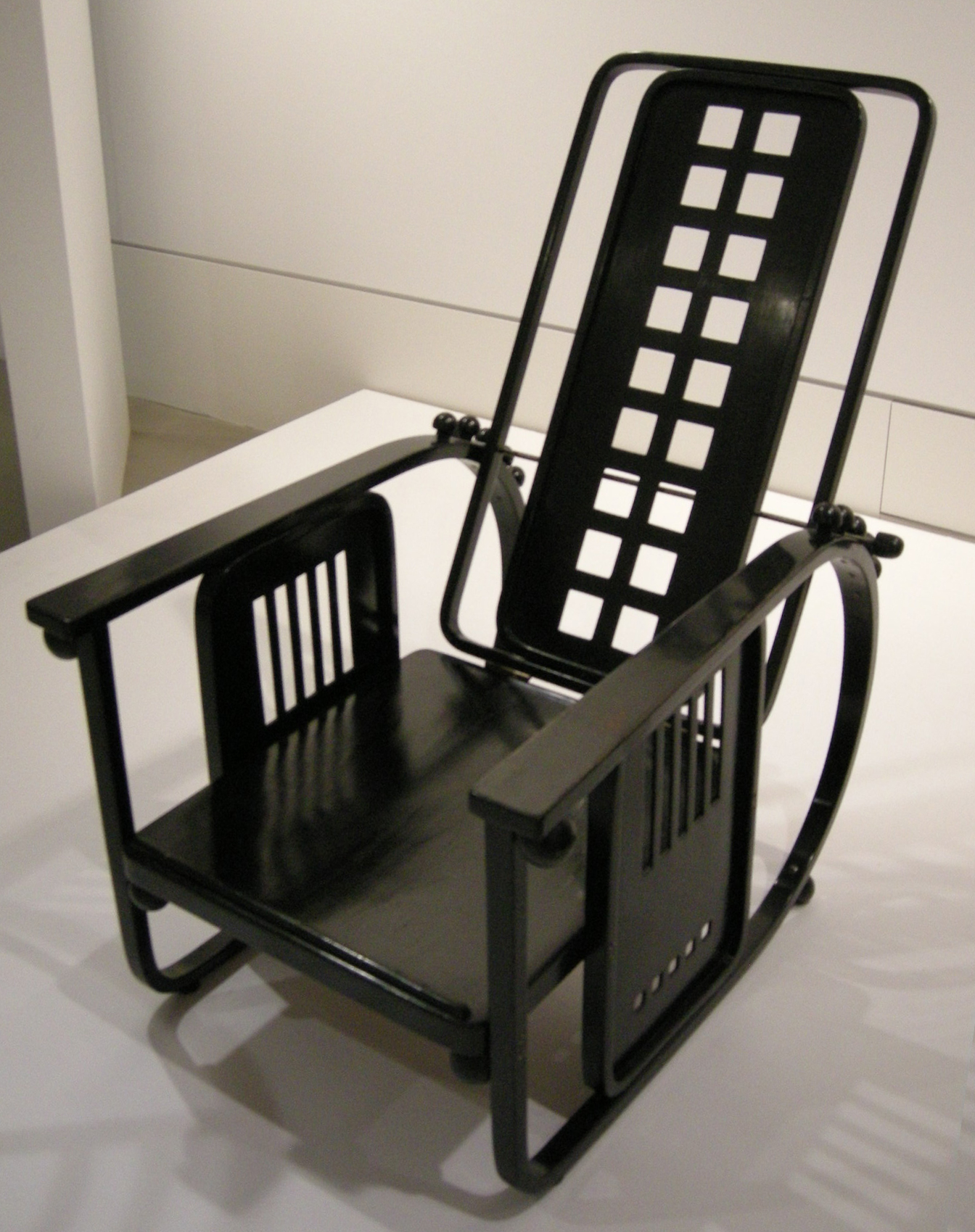
Sitzmaschine adjustable armchair by Josef Hoffmann (1905) (National Gallery of Victoria)

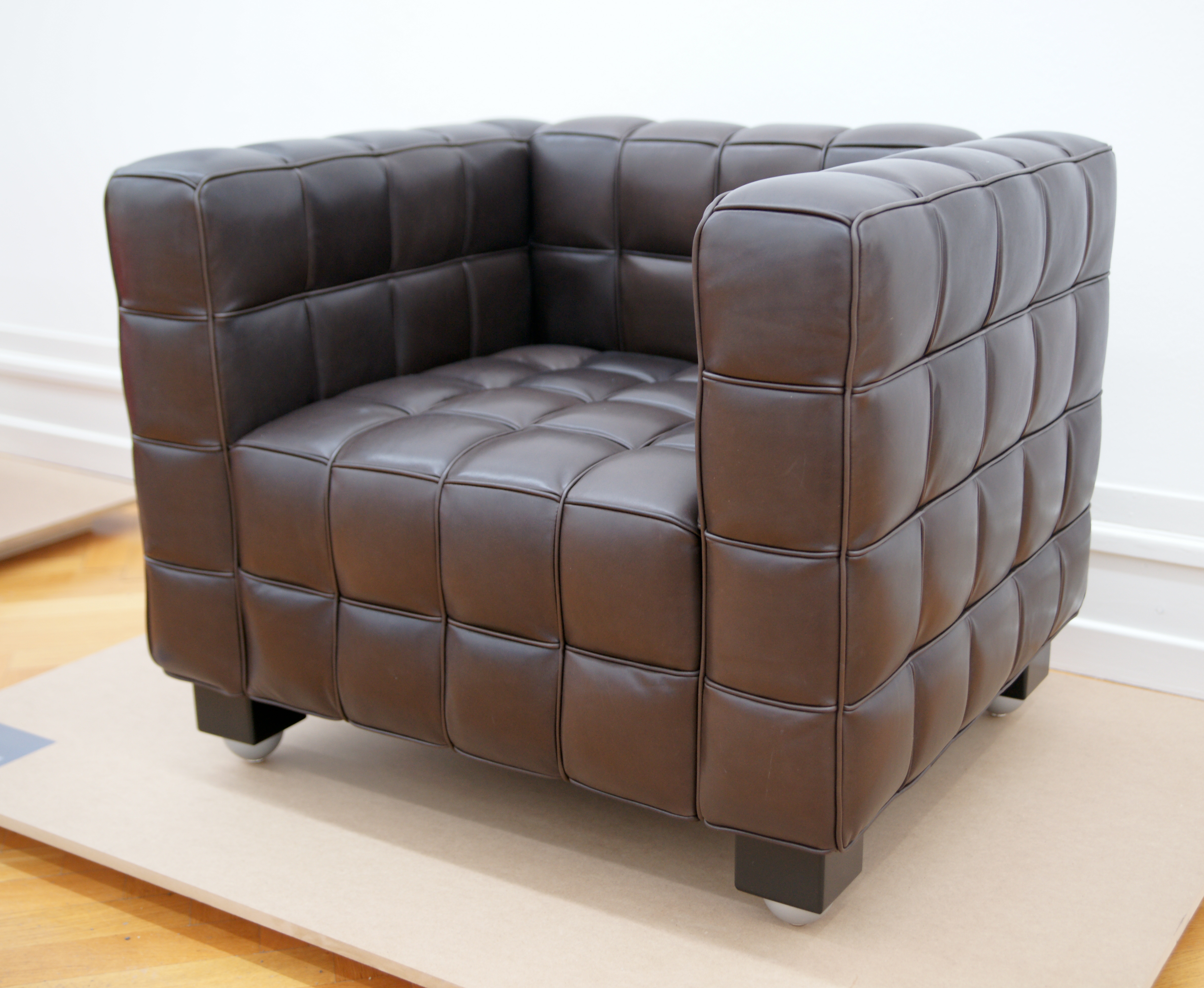
Kubus armchair by Josef Hoffmann (1910)

== The Netherlands – Nieuwe Kunst ==
In The Netherlands, where Art Nouveau was known as Nieuwe Kunst, the leading furniture creator was the architect Hendrik Petrus Berlage but can also be associated with Jan Eisenloeffel. He denounced the 19th century as "the century of ugliness", and wrote that "When you observe the interiors of homes, you can only shudder at the bric-a-bra the new call an interior." He designed several notable buildings, including the Beurs van Berlage (1896–1903) in his distinctive geometric constructivist style. One of his doctrines of furniture construction was to respect the nature of the material; he refused to shape wood into curving forms, since wood, he said, should not be treated as if it were metal. Decoration was provided in his furniture through metal ornaments, but even these disappeared, and his chairs and other pieces became wholly geometric. There is also a more decorative movement that is mostly advocated by the artists that worked together at the Arts and Crafts gallery in The Hague. Artists associated with this store are for example Agathe Wegerif-Gravestein, Chris Wegerif and Johan Thorn Prikker.

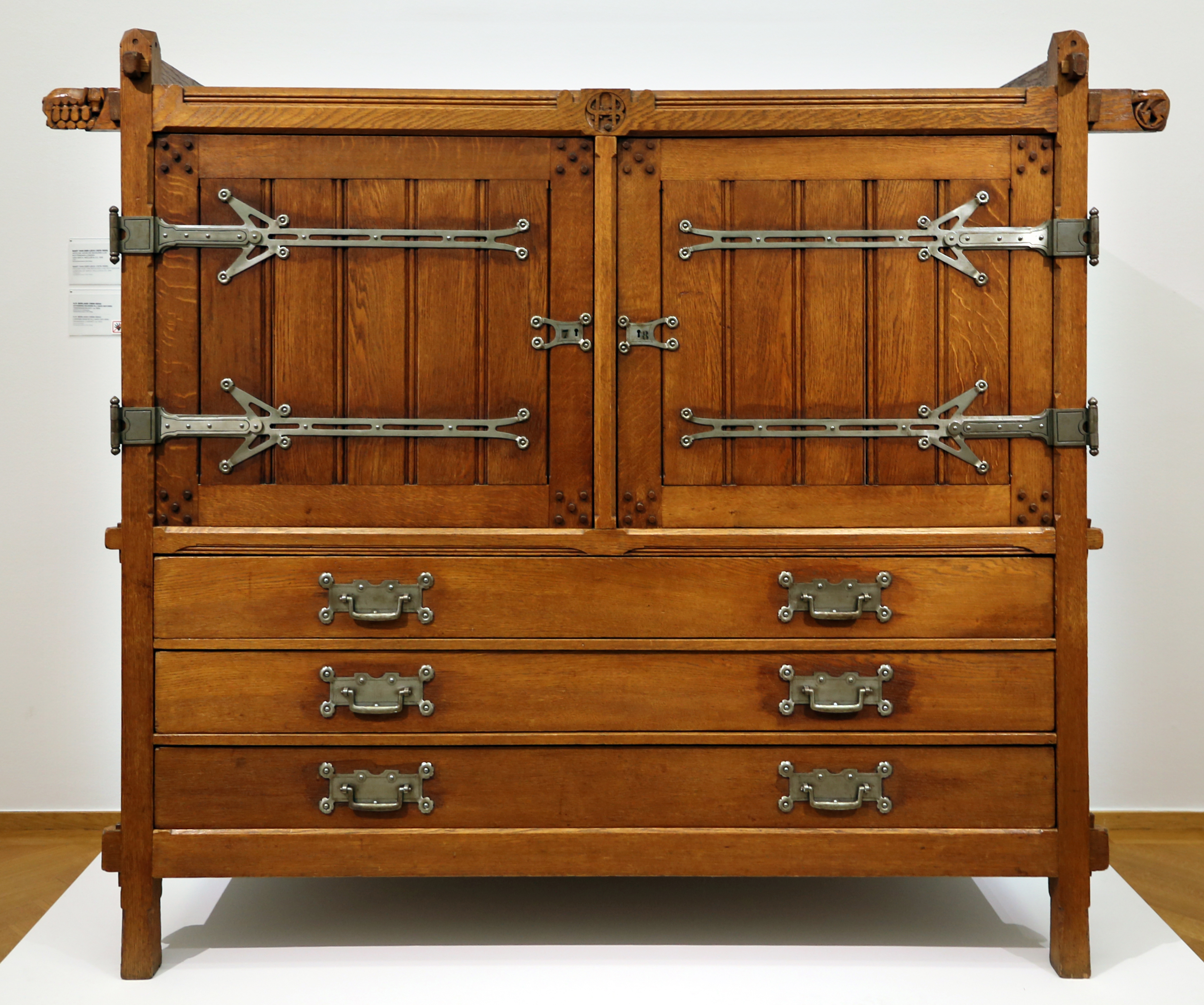
Cabinet and writing desk by Hendrik Petrus Berlage (1895)

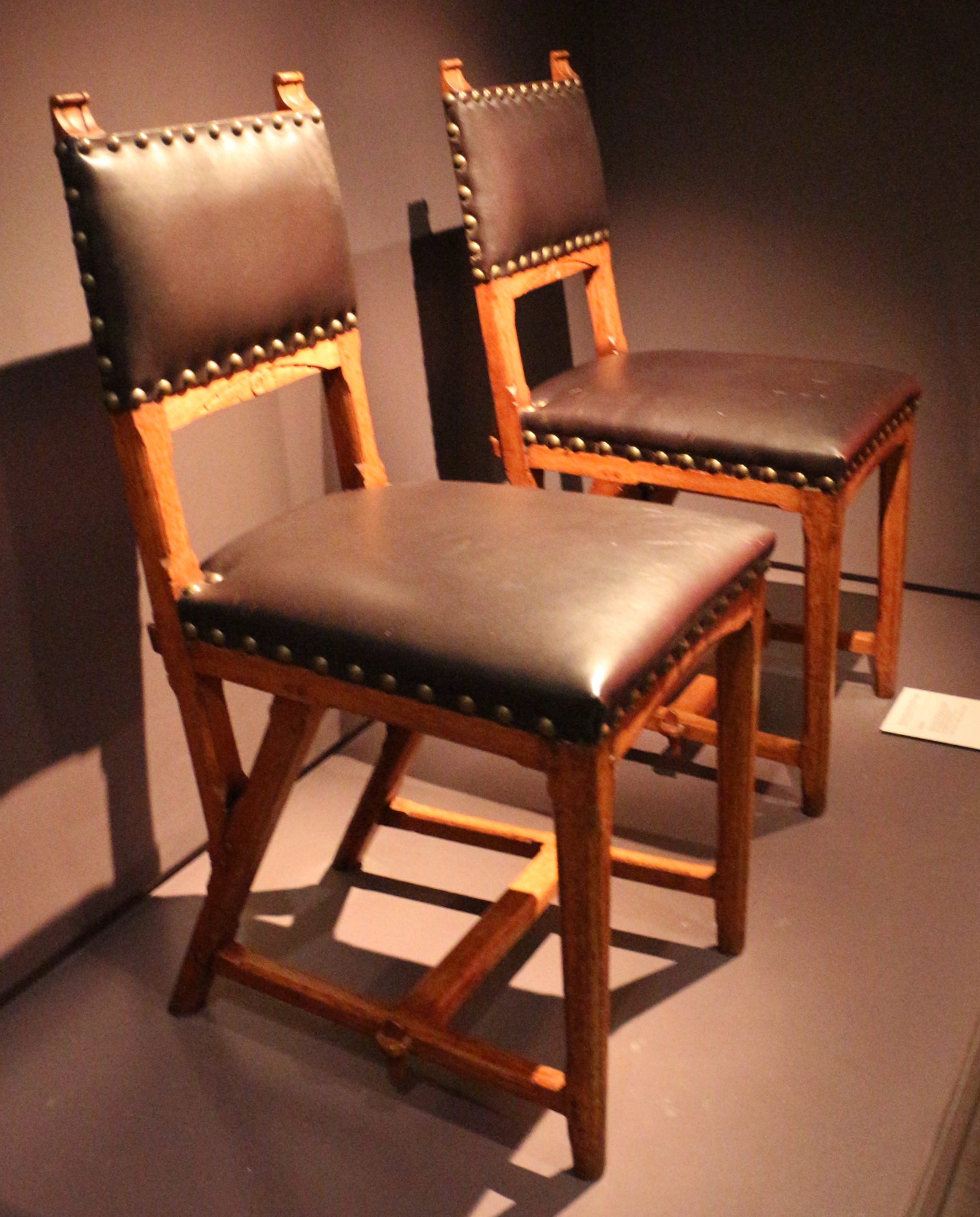
Office chairs for Dutch government by Hendrik Petrus Berlage (1895–96)

== Italy – Stile Liberty in Turin and Milan ==
In Italy, The Stile Liberty took its name from Arthur Lasenby Liberty and the store he founded in 1874 in London, Liberty Department Store, which specialized in importing ornaments, textiles and art objects from Japan and the Far East. An important center of the new style was the city of Turin, which in 1902 hosted a major exposition, Turino 1902, devoted to "the International Decorative Arts of the New Century".

The dominant figure in Italian furniture design and star of the 1902 Turin Exposition was Carlo Bugatti, the father of the celebrated automobile designer Ettore Bugatti. His pieces of furniture were in exactly the opposite of the geometric and functional furniture of the Jugendstil and the Vienna Secession. They were essentially works of sculpture and decoration; their function, whether as a chair or cupboard or a dining room table, was entirely secondary. His works included the Snail Chair, wood covered with painted parchment and copper, and an extraordinary sofa of wood and parchment, decorated with paint, fringe, and incrustations of brass. The spaces for seating were almost entirely hidden by the decoration.

Eugenio Quarti of Milan was another figure of note in the Italian style. After an apprenticeship in Paris and working a brief time for Carlo Bugatti, he opened his own shop and atelier and produced models which won recognition at the Antwerp Exposition of 1894 and the first Turin Exposition in 1892. He enlarged his firm in 1904 and produced furniture for important Italian clients. His work was much simpler in style than that of Bugatti, but he also sought to create unusual forms and materials, and delicate designs from inlays of brass and abalone shell.

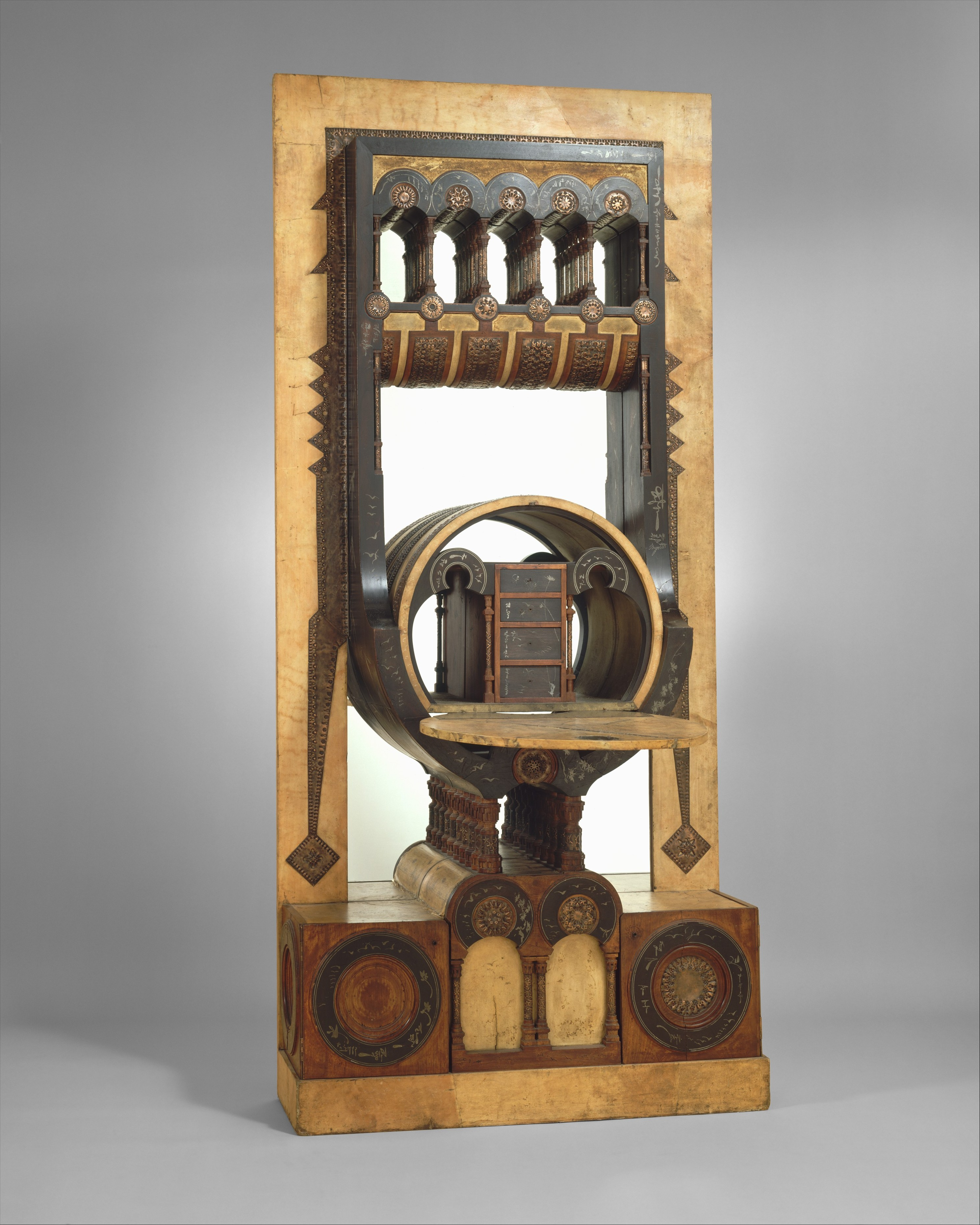
Desk by Carlo Bugatti (1895) (Metropolitan Museum of Art)

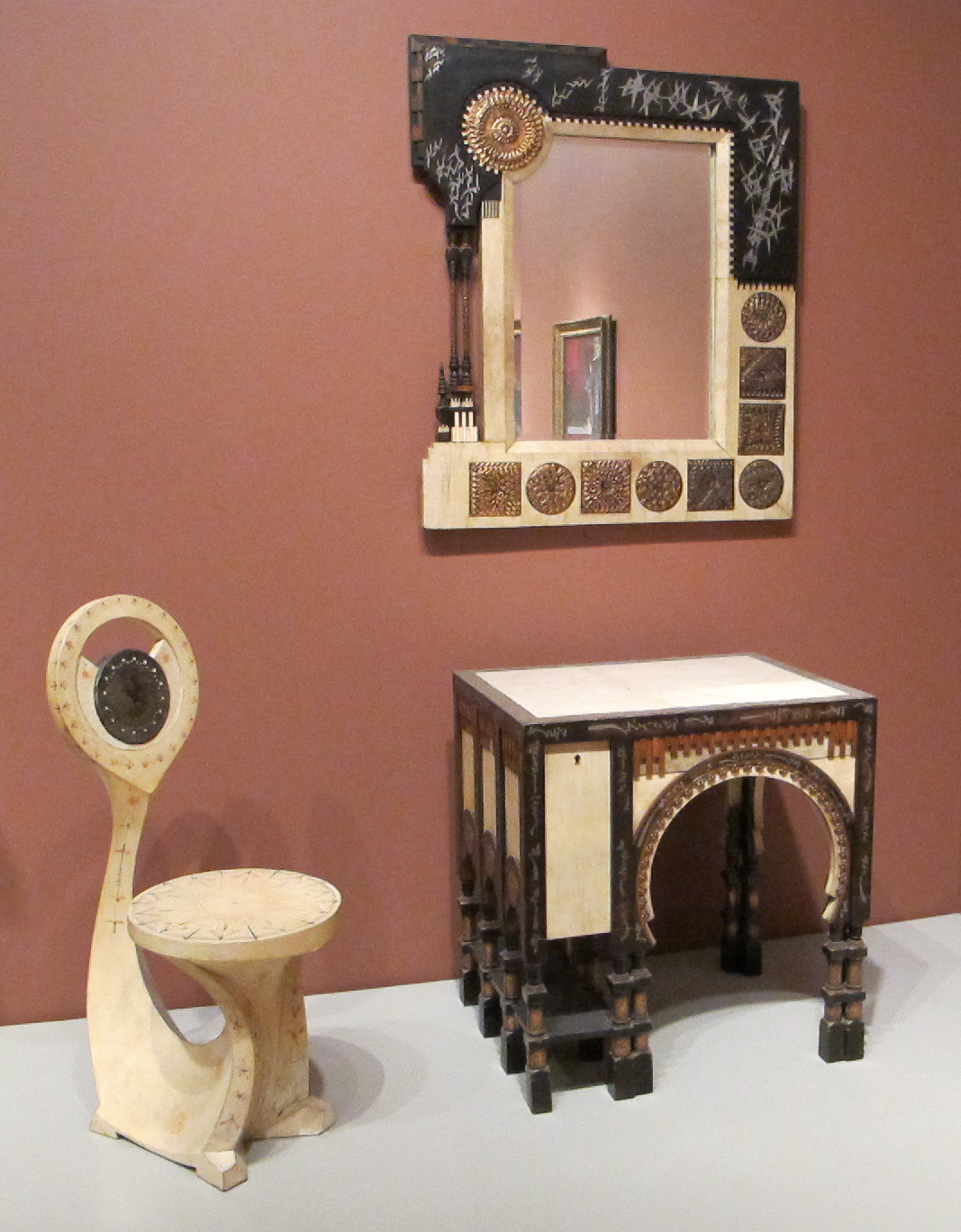
Chair, mirror and table by Carlo Bugatti (1902) (Chicago Art Institute)

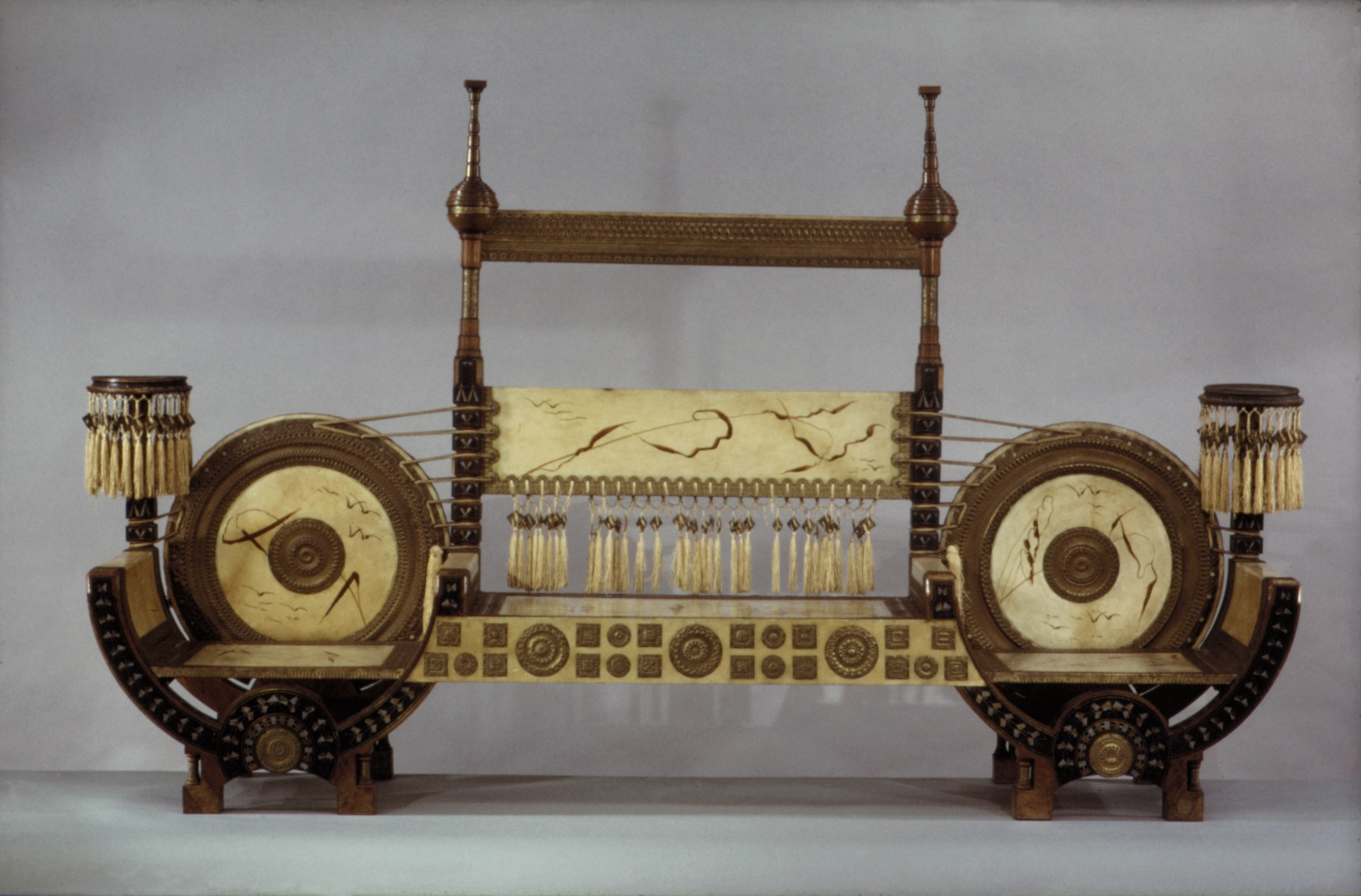
A seat by Carlo Bugatti of wood and parchment with inlays of hammered brass, painted decor and fringe (c. 1900)

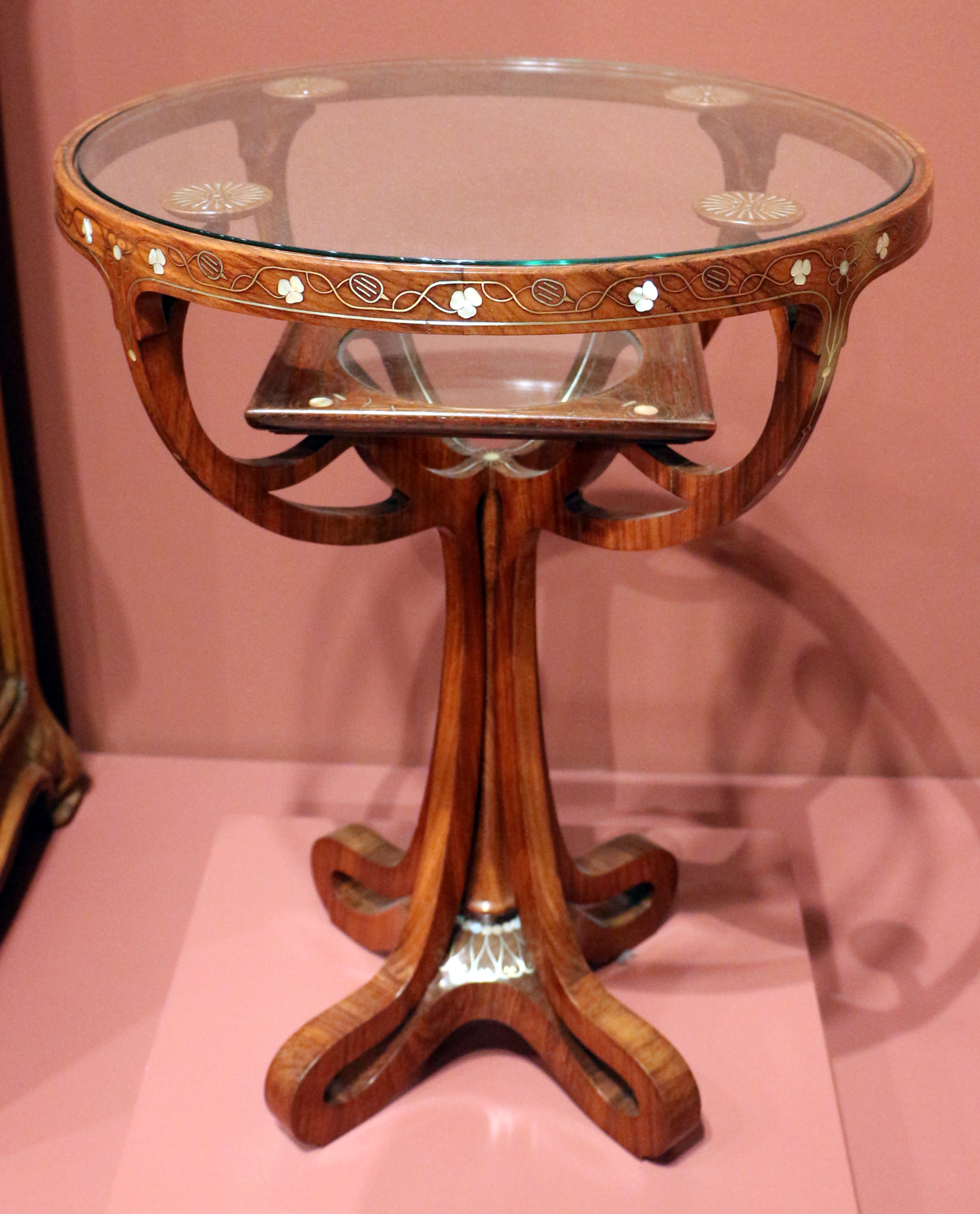
Table of wood, glass, and inlays of brass and abalone shell by Eugenio Quarti (1900)

== Spain – Modernisme in Barcelona ==
In Spain, the Modernismo movement in Catalonia produced the most original designs, led by the architect Antoni Gaudi. The furniture designer Gaspar Homar I Mezquida designed furniture that was inspired by natural forms, featuring the curving lines of the French and Belgian Art Nouveau, with touches of Catalan historic styles. The furniture of Gaspar Homar I Mezquida features fine marquetry inlays of colored woods.

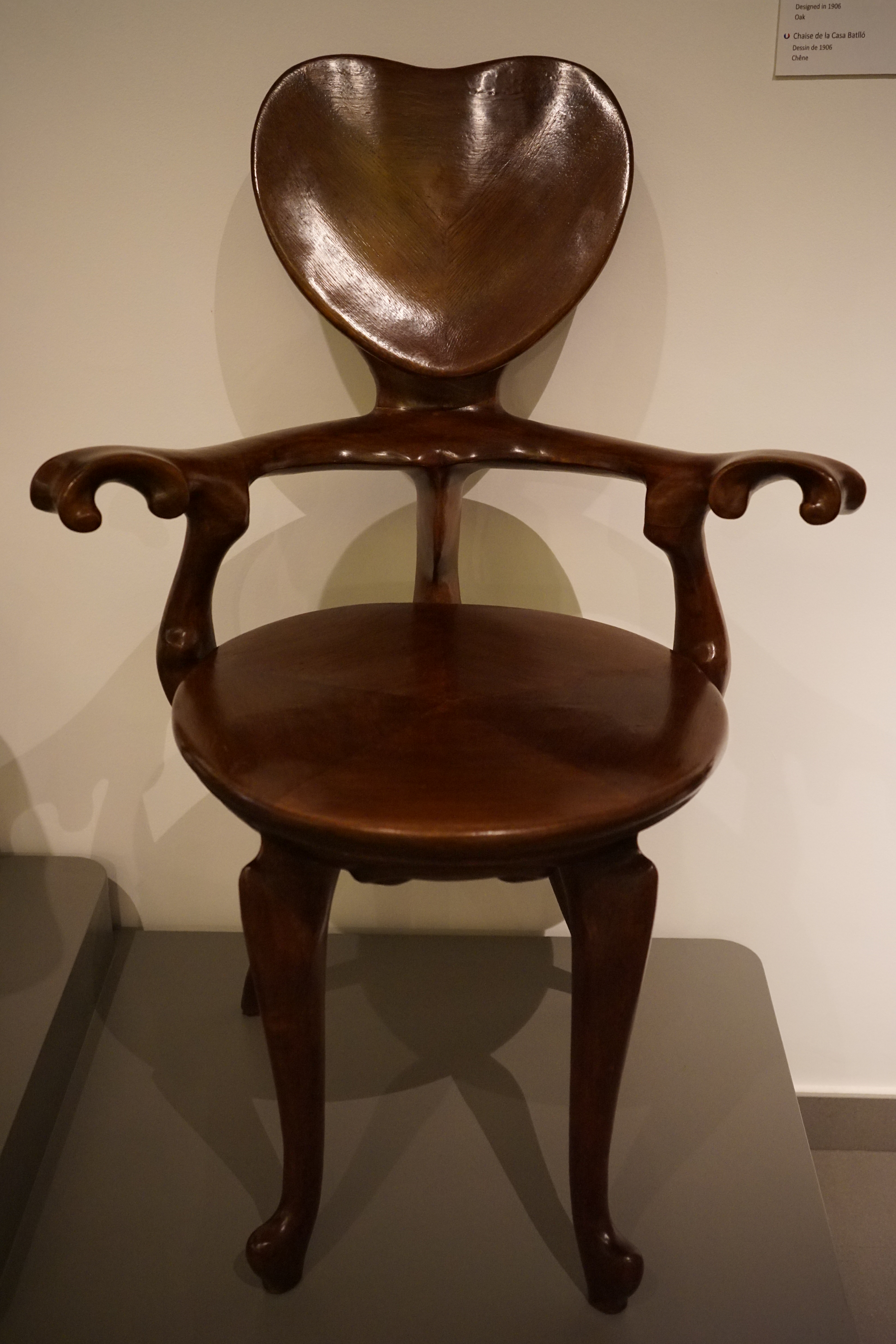
Oak chair from Casa Batlló by Antoni Gaudi (1906)

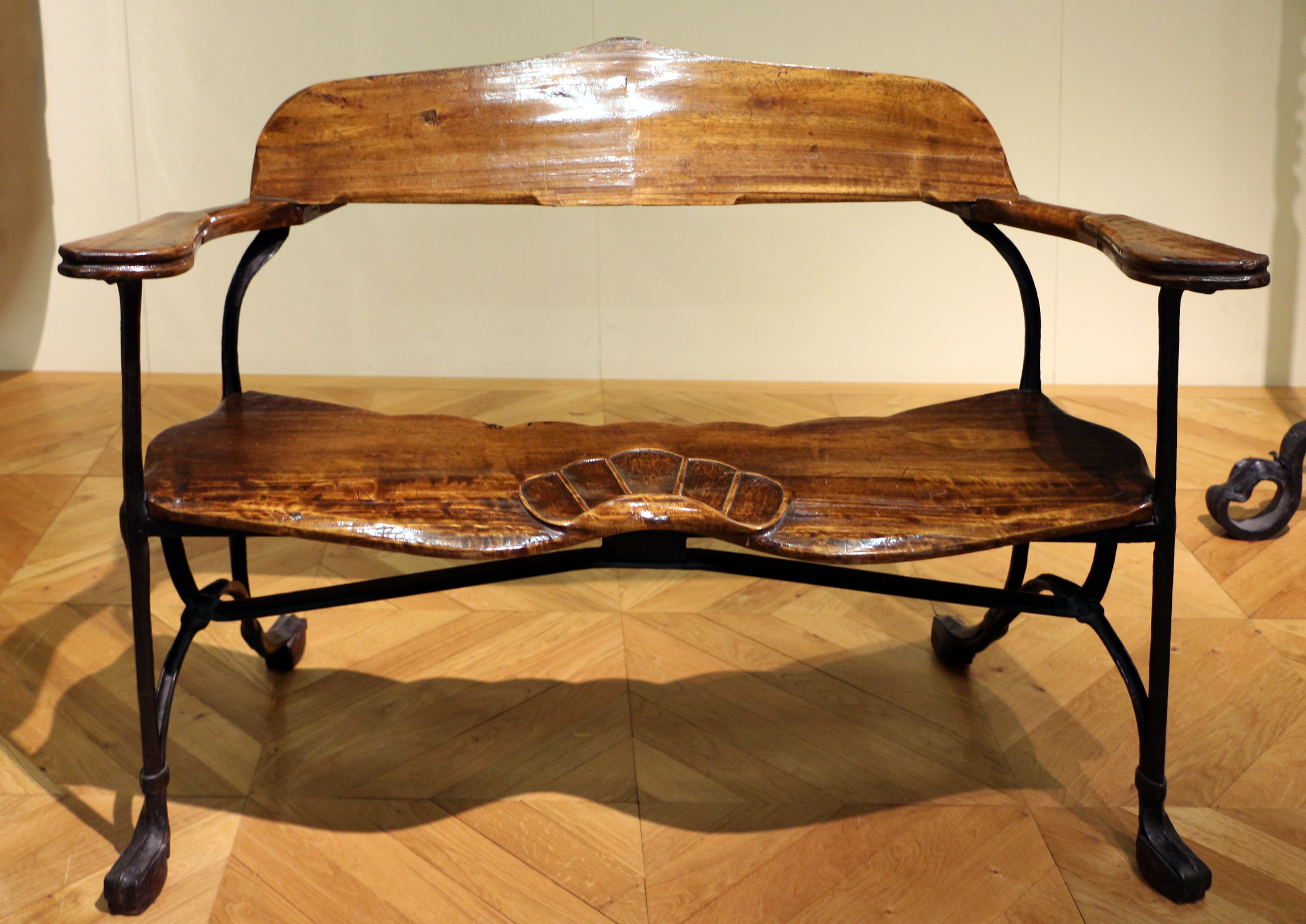
Bench by Antoni Gaudi (1910)

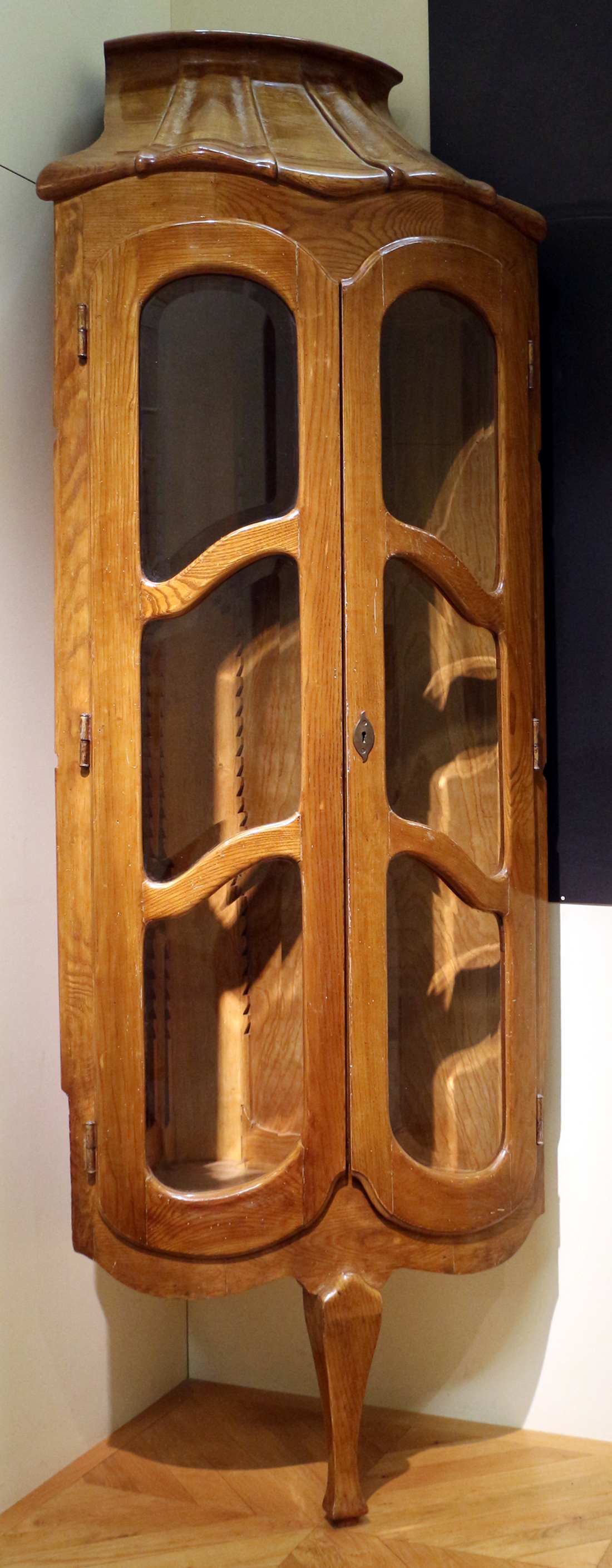
Corner vitrine by Antoni Gaudi (1905–06)

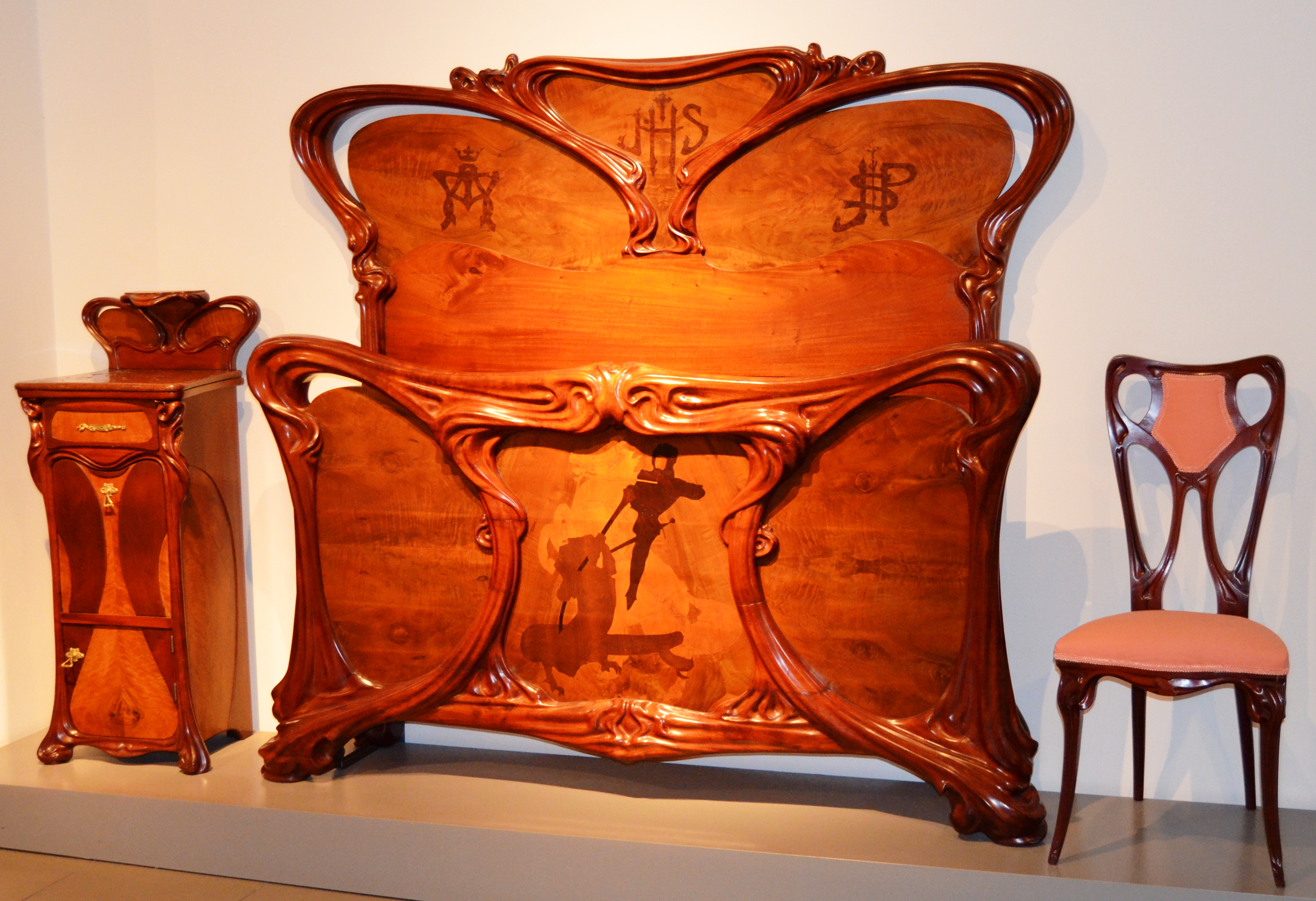
Headboard of bed by Gaspar Homar I Mezquida (1902). (Museu del Modernisme Català)

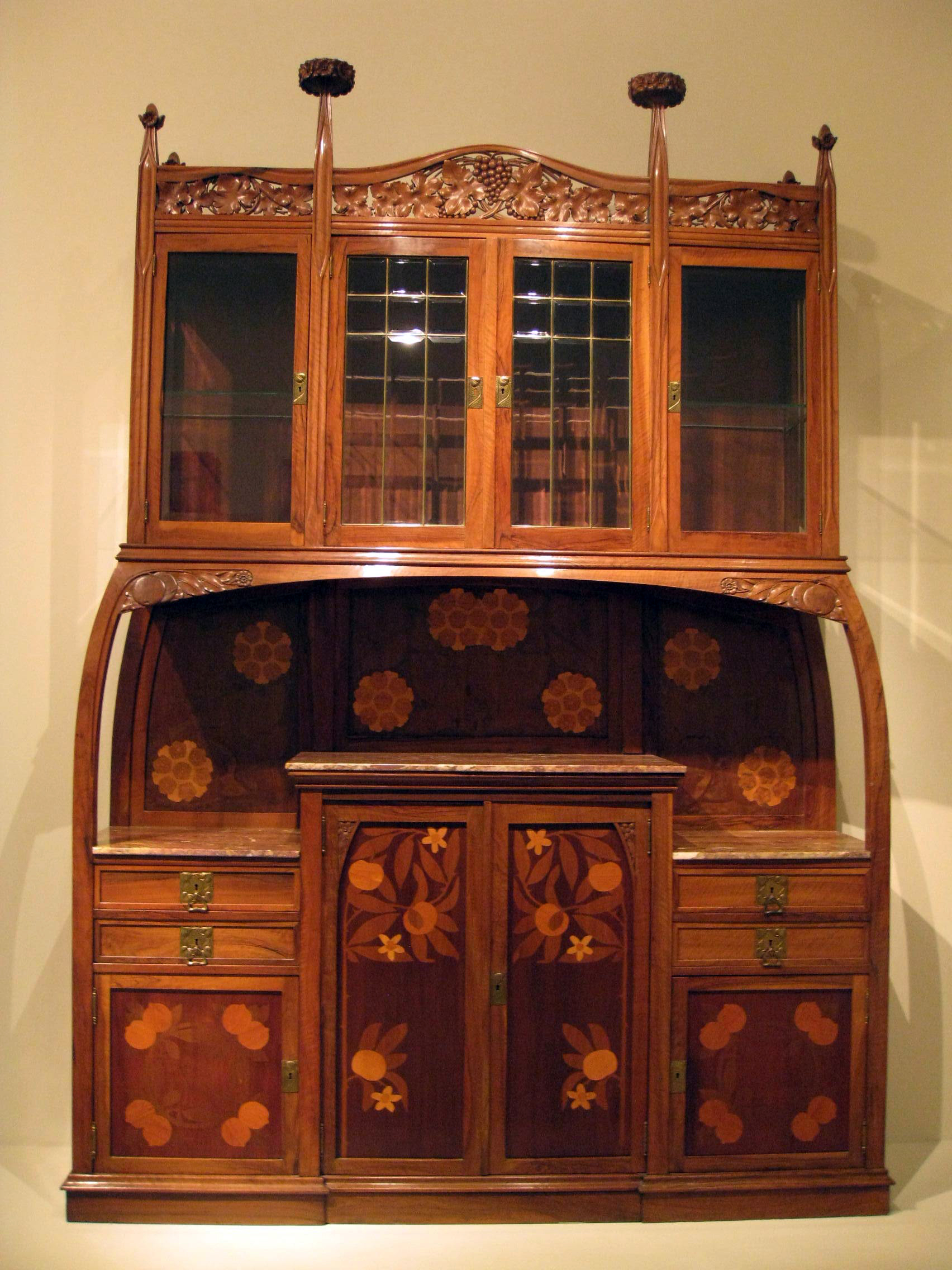
Buffet by Gaspar Homar I Mezquida

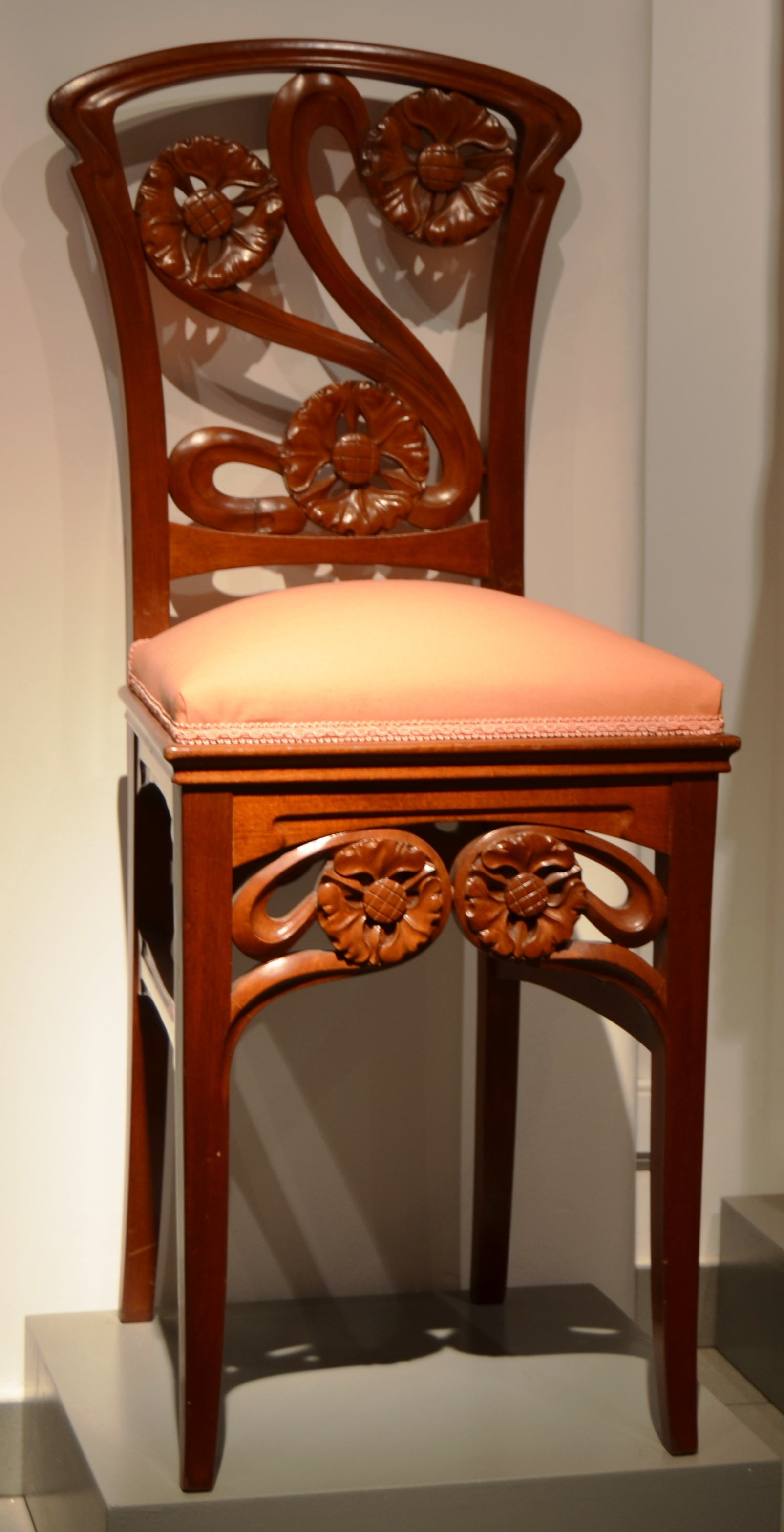
Piano chair by Modernisme artist Gaspar Homar I Mezquida (1906)

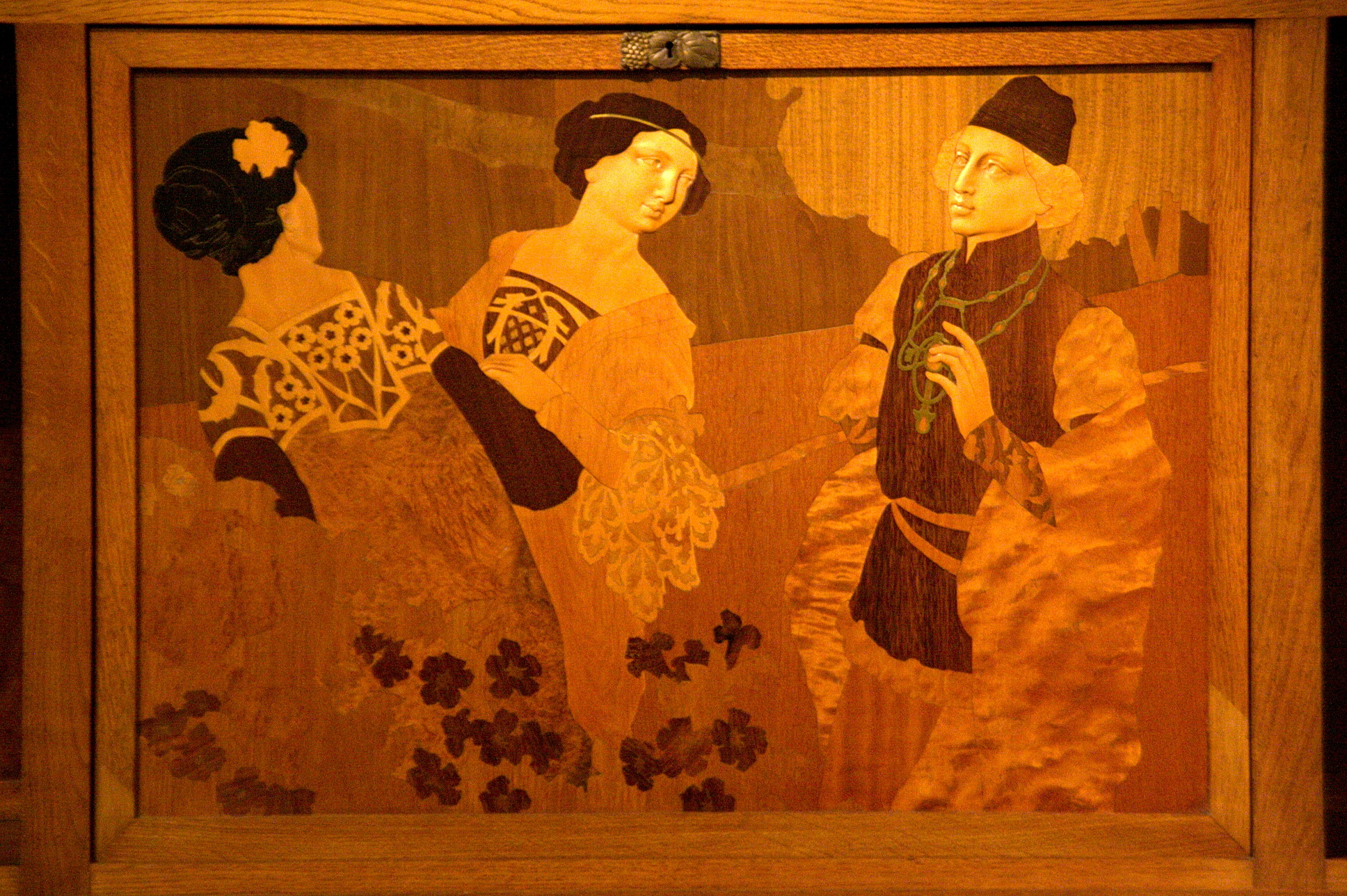
Furniture inlay by Gaspar Homar I Mezquida

== The United States – American Craftsman style ==
The most famous American Art Nouveau designer was Louis Comfort Tiffany, best known for his lamps, jewelry and stained glass. He also designed some chairs and other pieces of furniture. Some of the chairs were overloaded with decoration and embroidery, but others were finely made and discreetly decorated with geometric inlays in the wood.

In the United States, new furniture design at the beginning of the 20th century was largely inspired by the British Arts and Crafts Movement, which in turn inspired The American Craftsman style, the American Arts and Crafts movement. One designer who introduced Art Nouveau themes was Charles Rohlfs in Buffalo, New York, whose designs for American white oak furniture were also influenced by motifs of Celtic Art and Gothic art, with touches of Art Nouveau in the metal trim applied to the pieces.

In California the architects Charles and Henry Greene experimented with eclectic styles, then gradually developed their own distinct California version of the American craftsman style with simple geometric forms, little ornament, fine woodwork and a distinct Japanese influence. The most famous example is the Gamble House in Pasadena, California.

Frank Lloyd Wright is not considered an Art Nouveau architect, but the early furniture he designed strongly resembled the geometric furniture of the Vienna Secession and other late Art Nouveau movements of the same period.

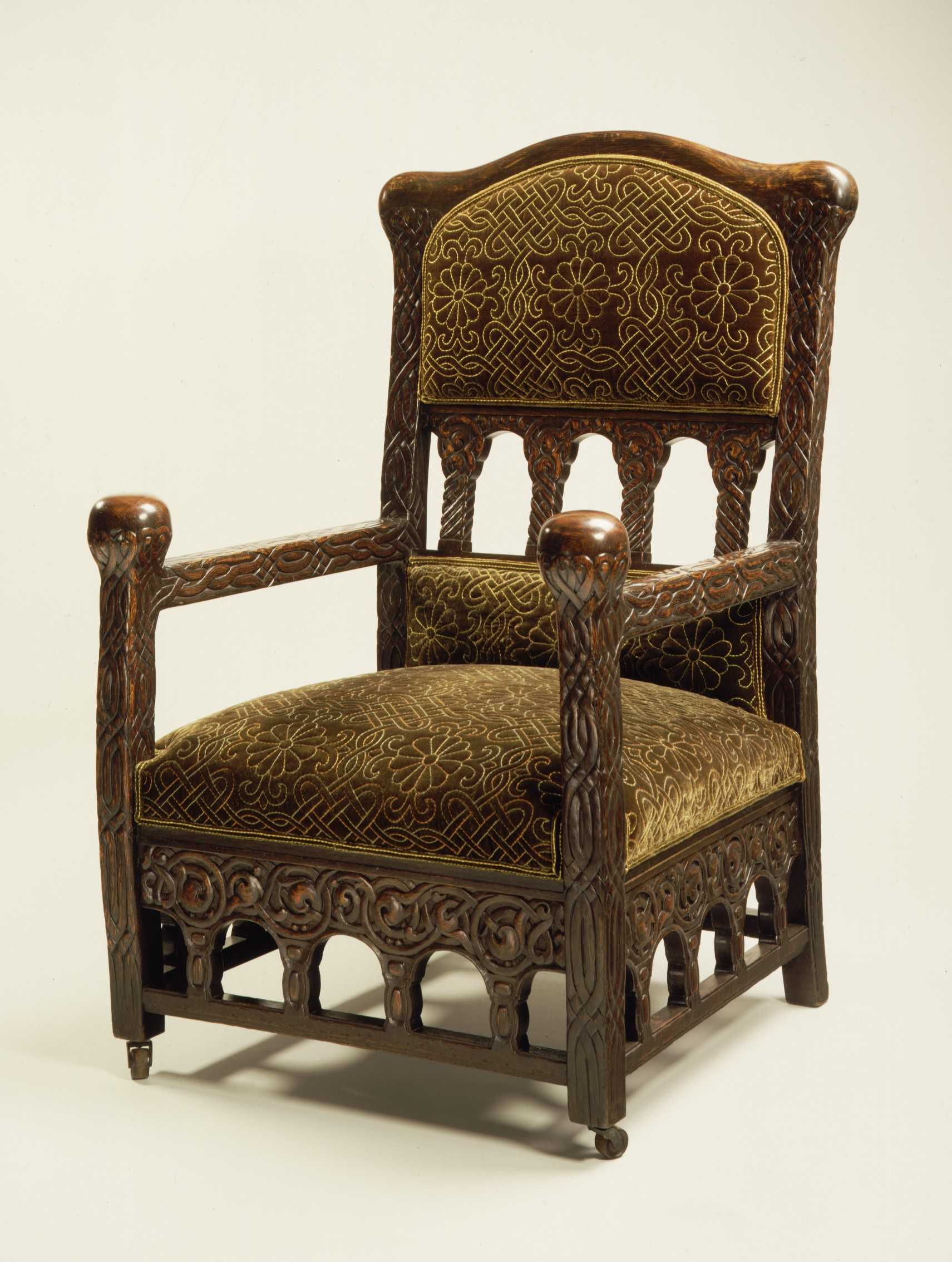
Armchair by Louis Comfort Tiffany (1892–94)

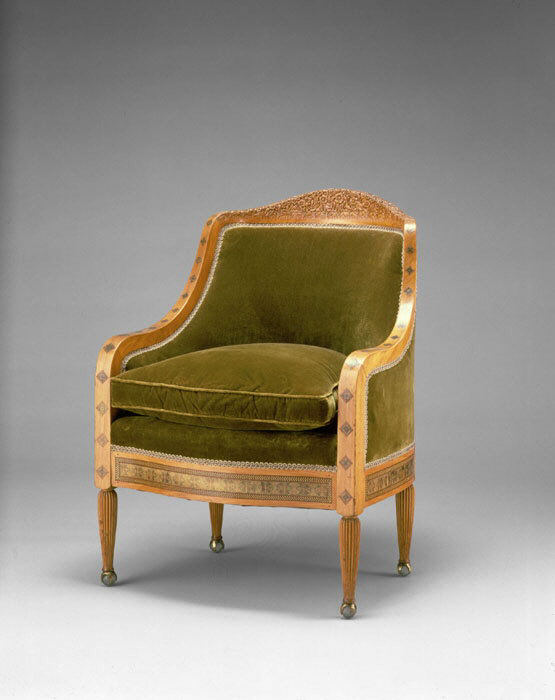
Armchair by Louis Comfort Tiffany, (1891–93) (Metropolitan Museum of Art)

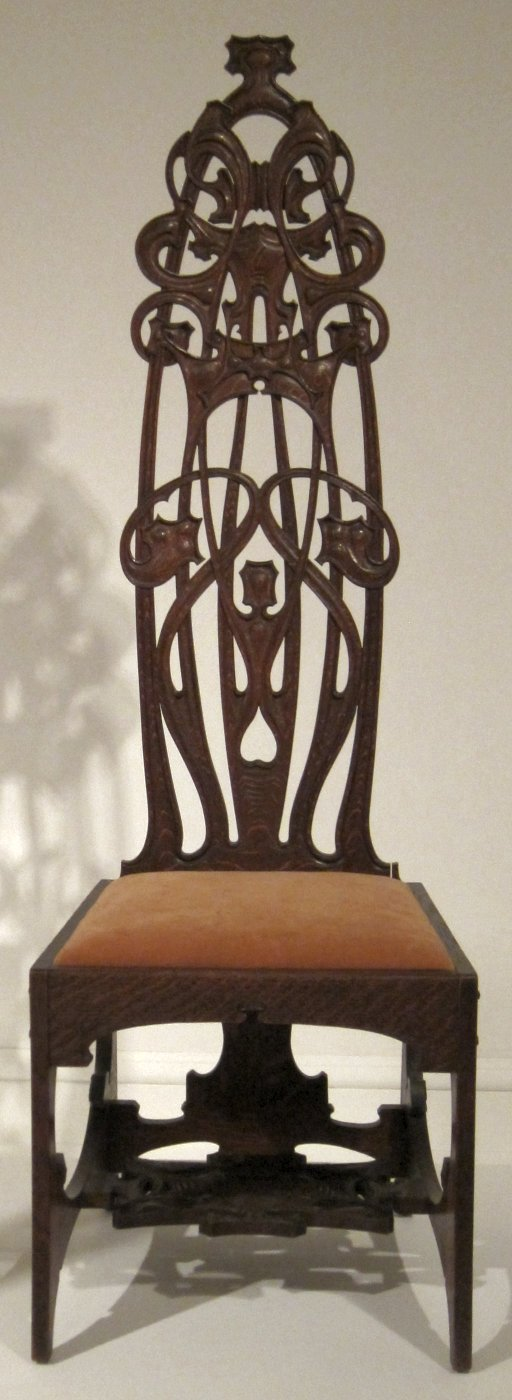
Oak chair by Charles Rohlfs (1898–99)

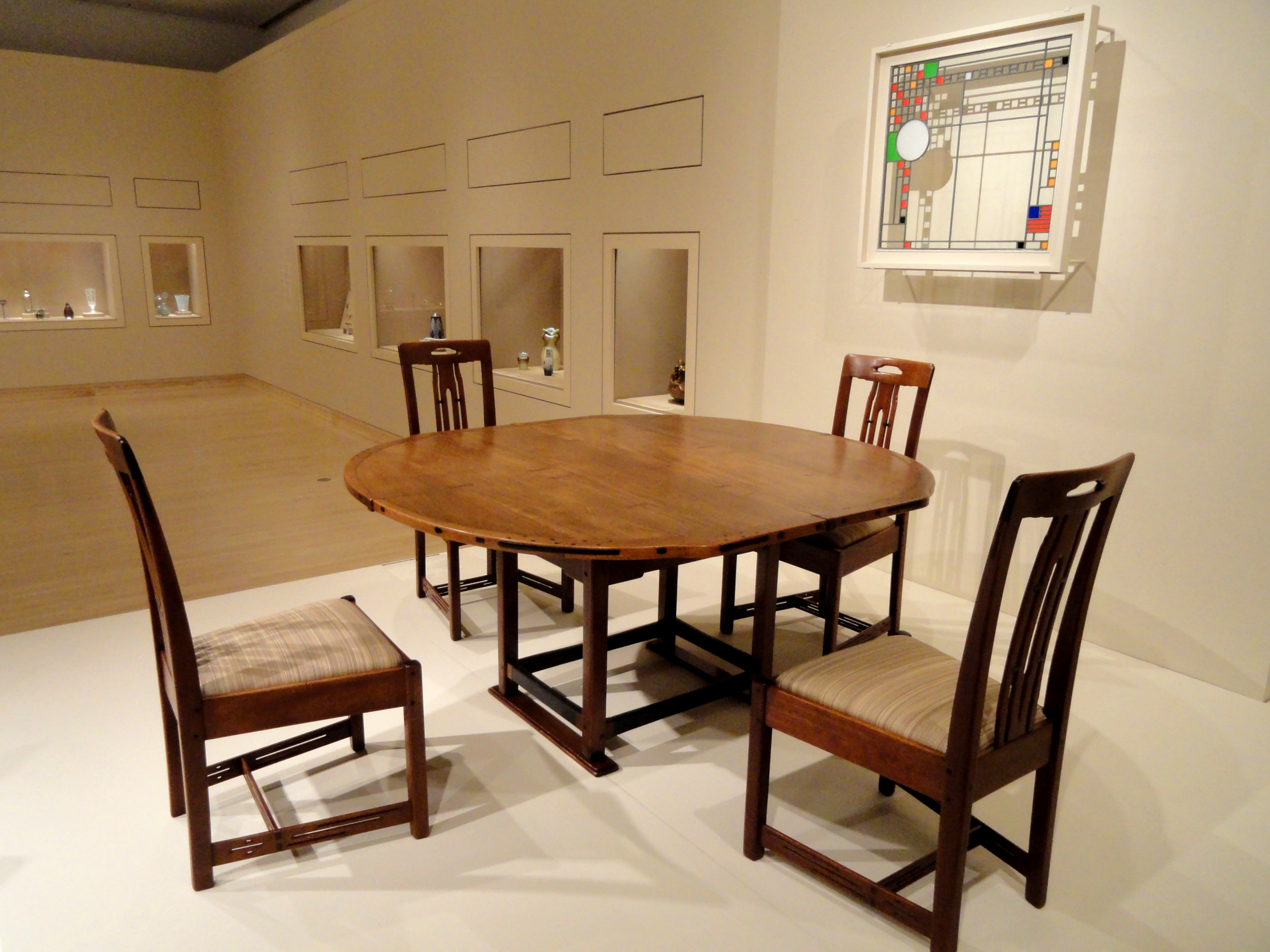
Dining Room furniture by Greene and Greene (1908) (Indianapolis Museum of Art)

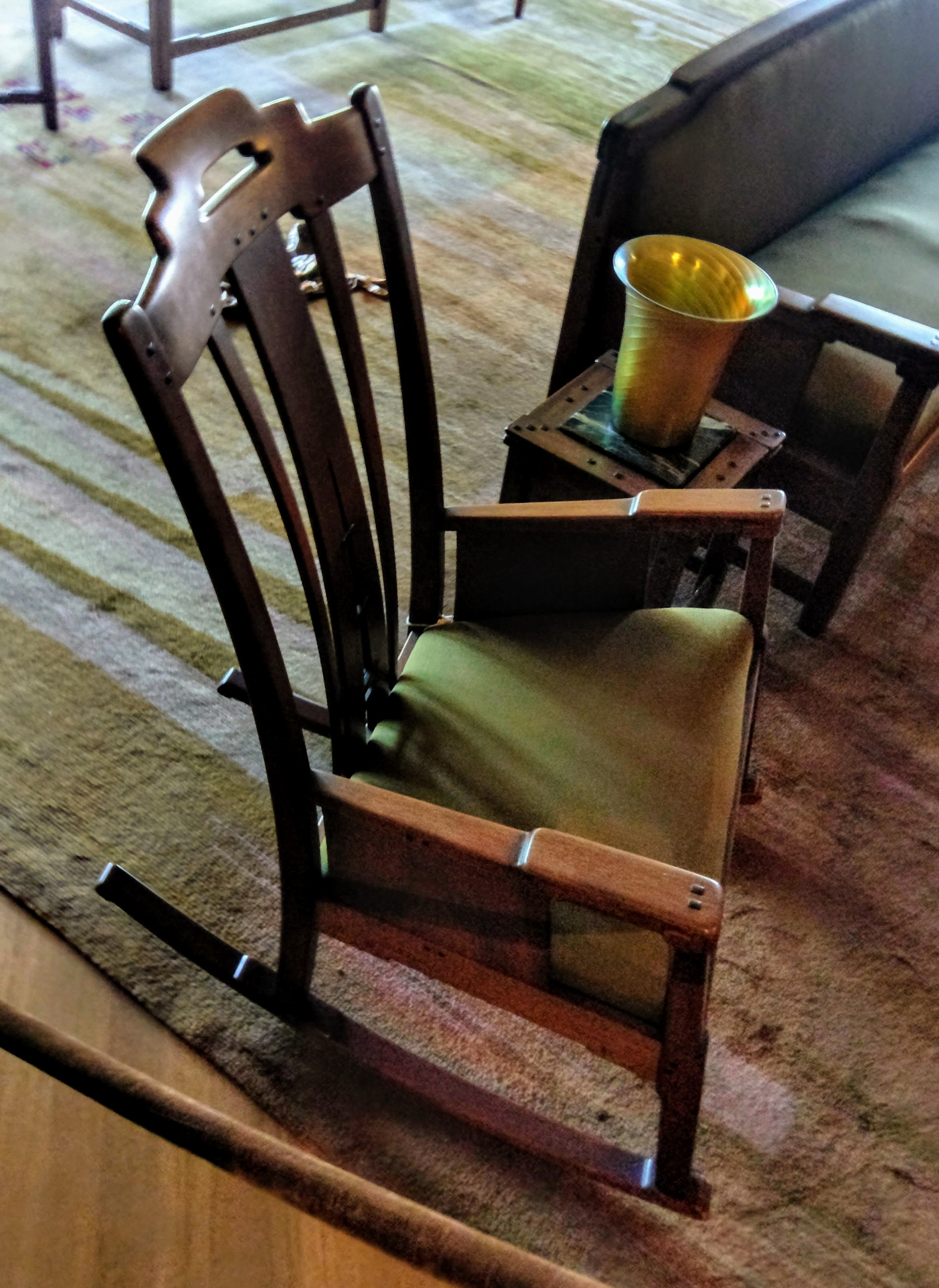
Rocking chair in Gamble House in Pasadena, by Greene and Greene (1908–1909)

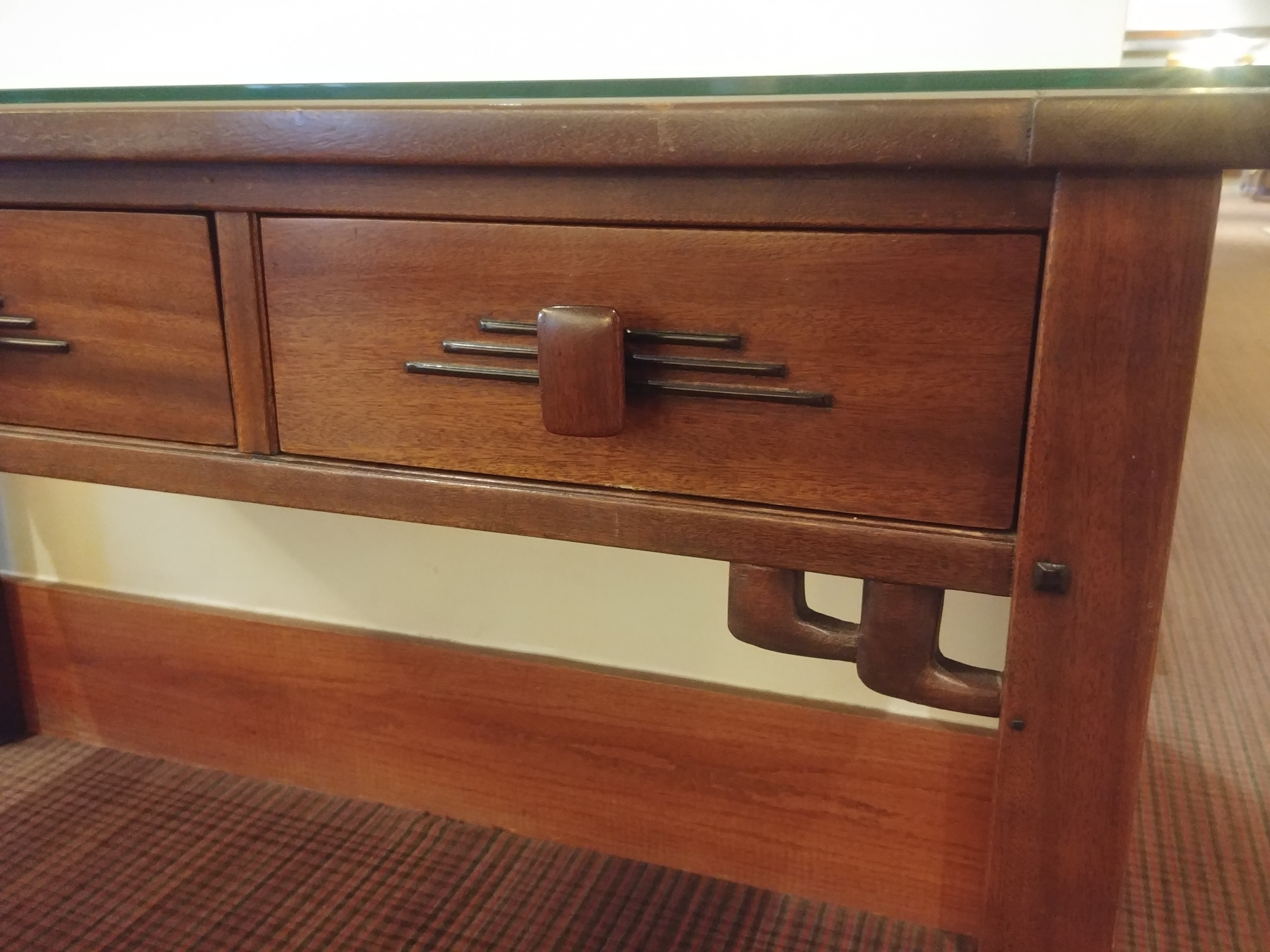
Drawer of a Greene and Greene table

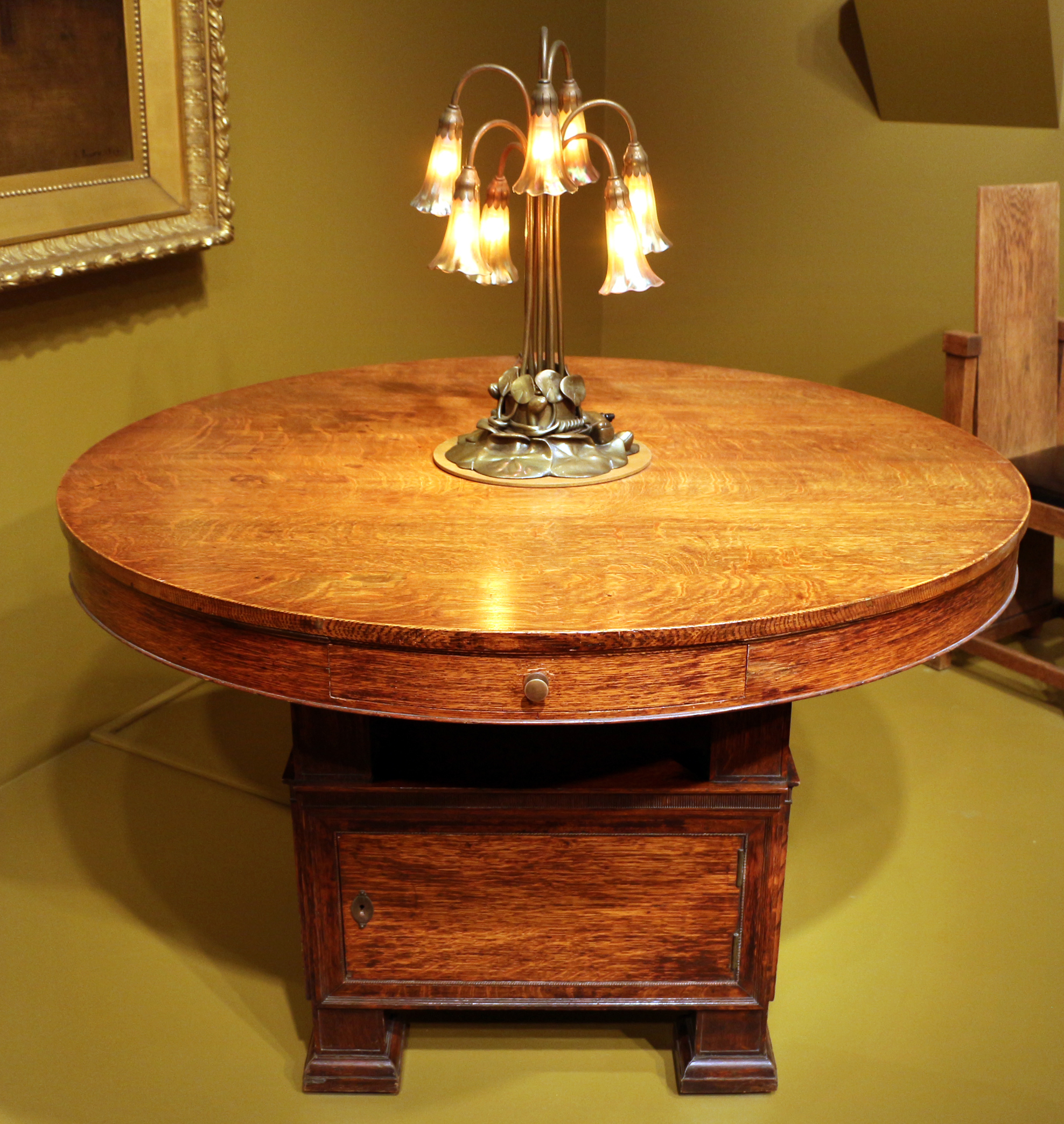
Library table by Frank Lloyd Wright (1896) with Tiffany & Co. Lamp (1902–07)

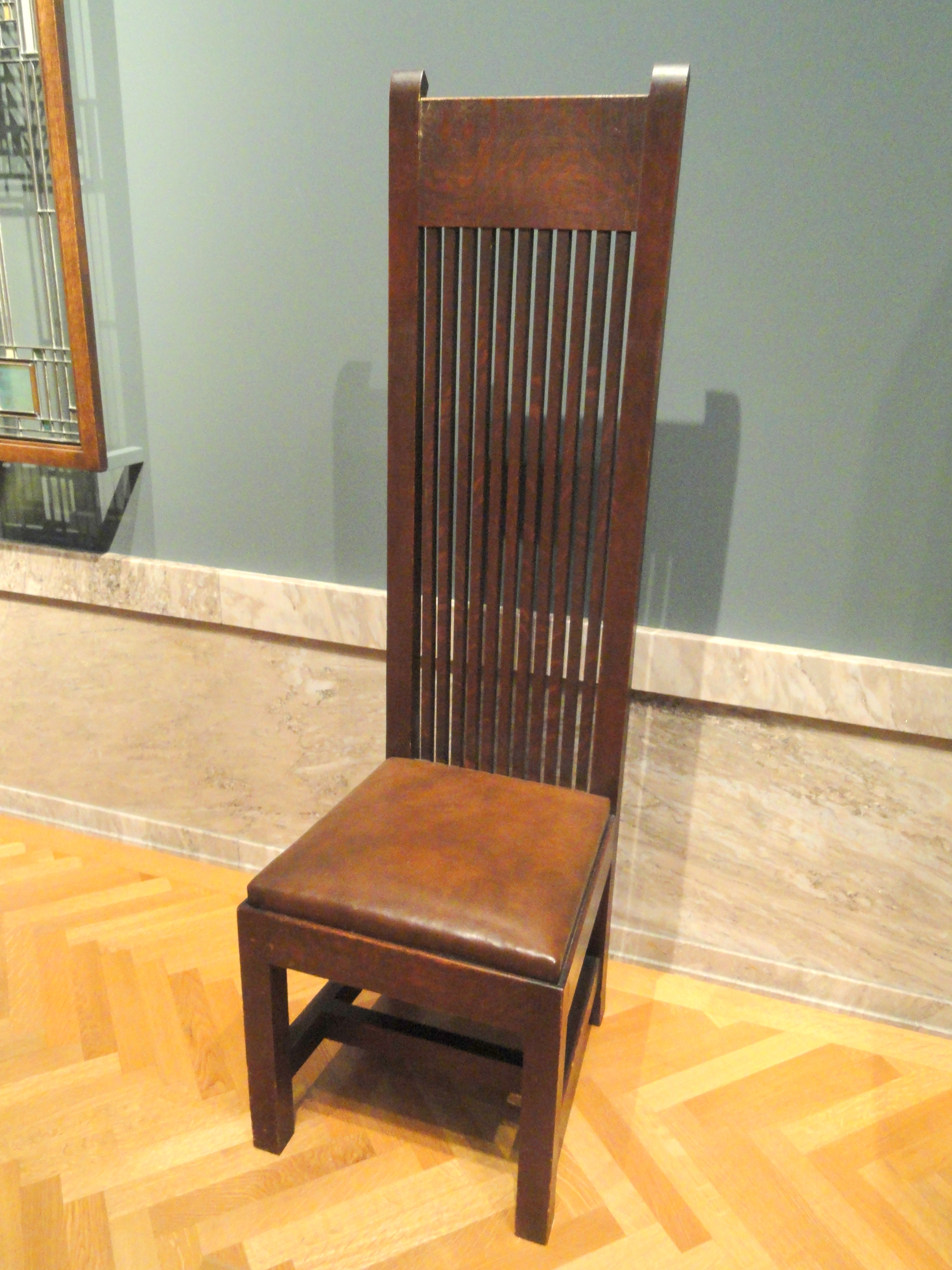
Side chair by Frank Lloyd Wright (c. 1902) (Cleveland Museum of Art)

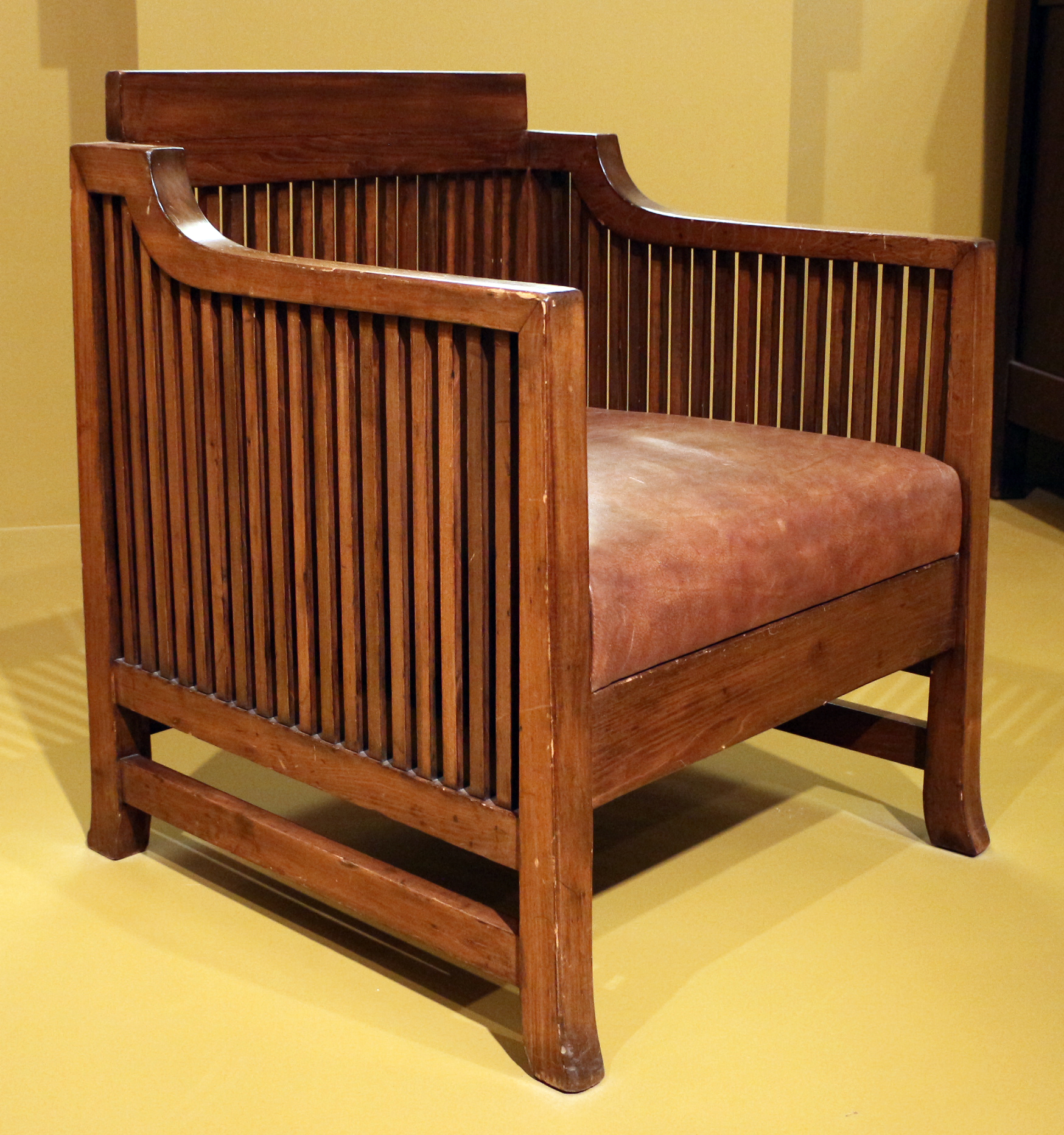
Frank Lloyd Wright, armchair (1902–06)

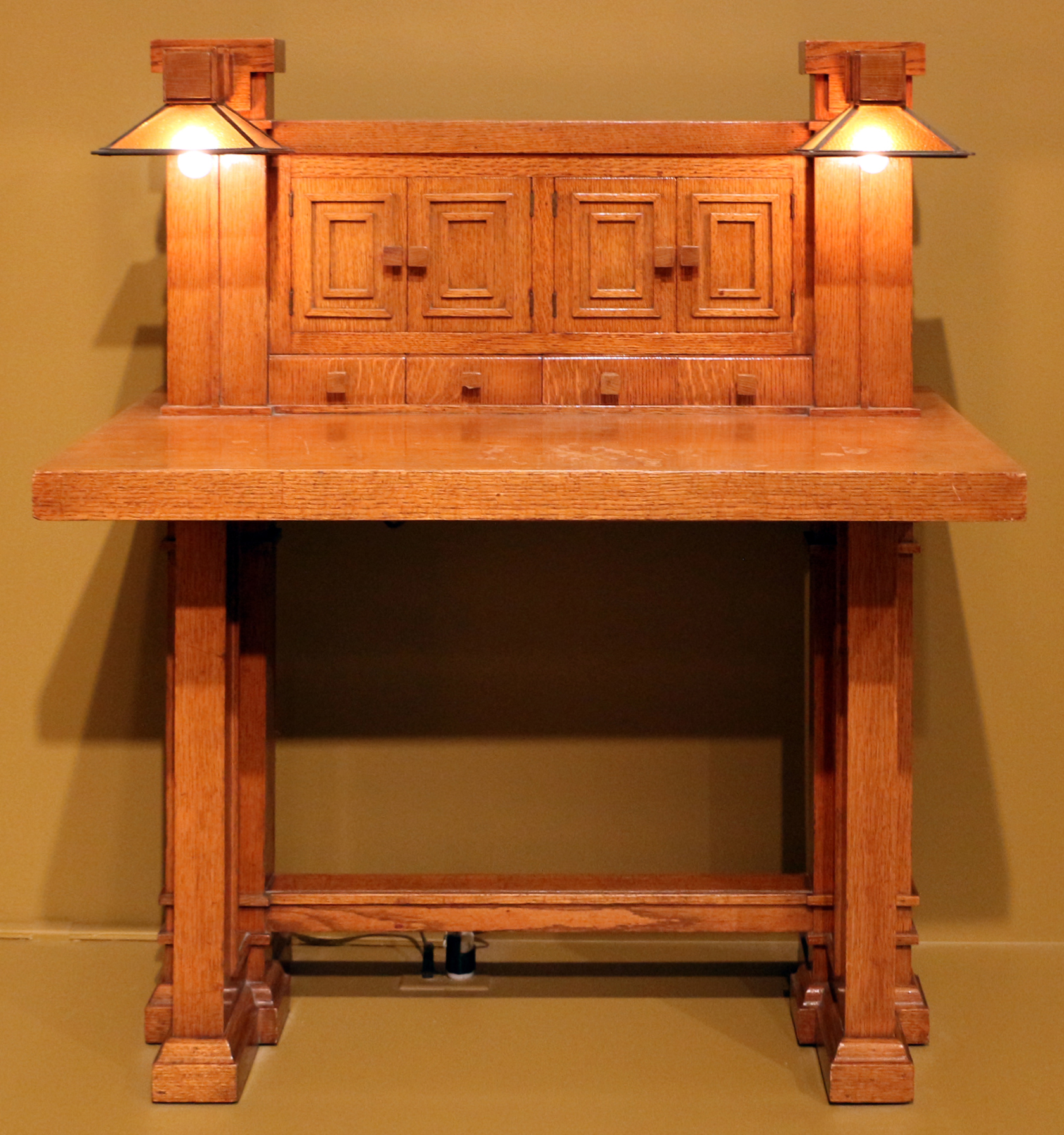
Desk by Frank Lloyd Wright/George Mann Niedecken (1908)

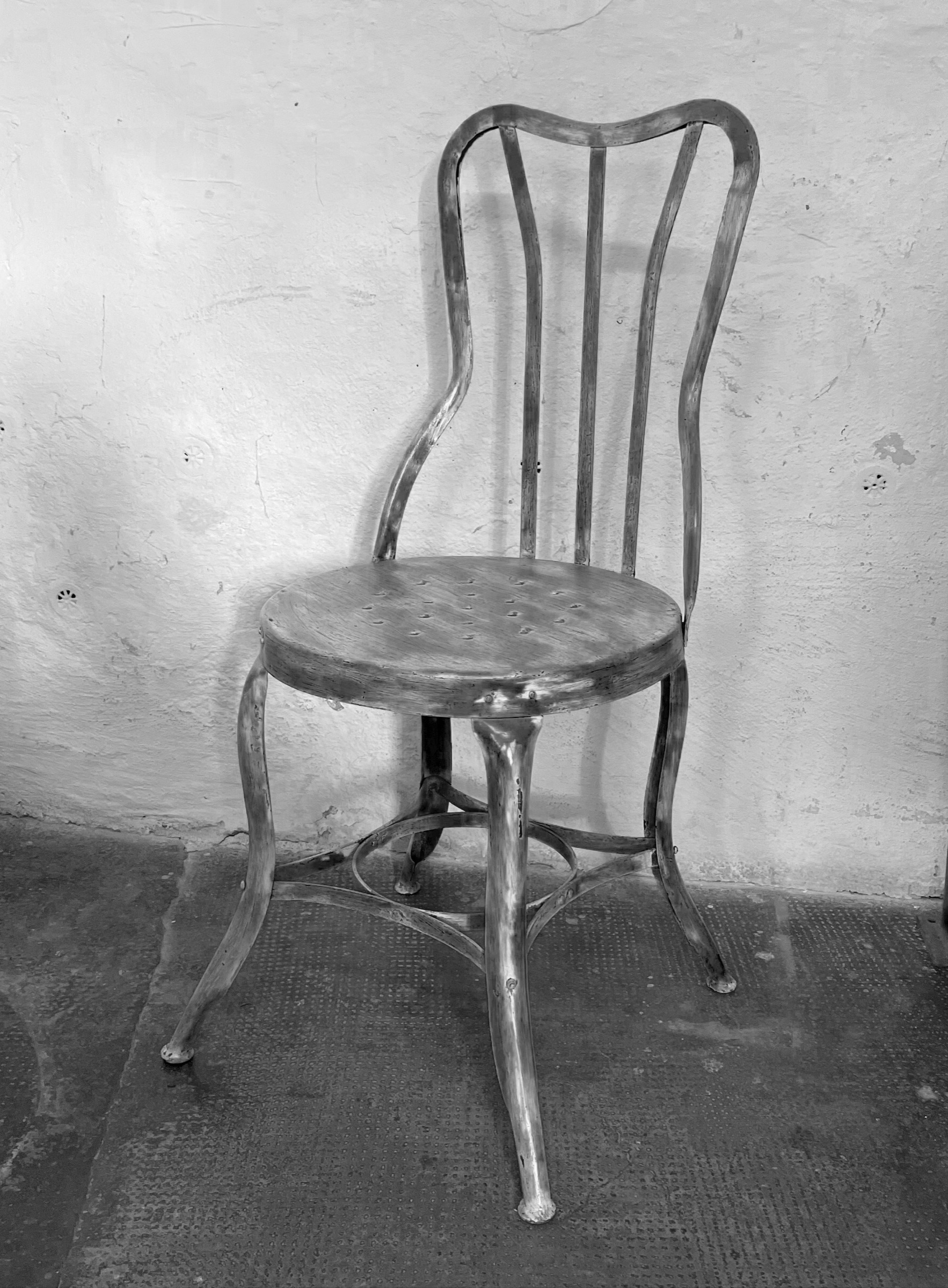
TOLEDO UHL steel chair "SODA FOUNTAIN" from 1910, Ohio

== Bibliography ==
=== Books ===
- De Morant, Henry (1970). Histoire des arts décoratifs (in French). Librarie Hachette.
- Ducher, Robert (1988). "Style Art Nouveau: Mobilier". Caractéristique des Styles (in French). Flammarion. pp. 204–205. ISBN 2-08-011539-1.
- Fahr-Becker, Gabriele (2015). L'Art Nouveau (in French). H.F. Ullmann. ISBN 978-3-8480-0857-5.
- Lucie-Smith, Edward (1979). Furniture, A Concise History. Thames and Hudson.
- Makinson, Randall (1977). Greene & Greene: Architecture as a Fine Art. Salt Lake City, Utah: Gibbs Smith. ISBN 0-87905-023-3.
- Riley, Noël (2004). Grammaire des Arts Décoratifs (in French). Flammarion.
- Rodel, Kevin P.; Binzen, Jonathan (2003). Arts & crafts furniture: From classic to contemporary. Newtown, CT (US): Taunton Press. ISBN 978-1-56158-359-1.
- Sembach, Klaus-Jürgen (2016). Art Nouveau: Utopia : Reconciling the Irreconcilable. Taschen. ISBN 978-3-8365-2096-6.
- Taschen, Aurelia; Taschen, Balthazar (2016). L'Architecture Moderne de A à Z (in French). Bibliotheca Universalis. ISBN 978-3-8365-5630-9.
- Weisberg, Gabriel P. (2004). "The Creation of Japonisme". In Gabriel P. Weisberg; Edwin Becker; Evelyne Possémé (eds.). The origins of l'art nouveau: The Bing empire. Amsterdam; Paris; Ithaca (US): Van Gogh Museum; Musée des Arts décoratifs; Distributed in North America by Cornell University Press. pp. 51–72. ISBN 978-90-6153-572-0.

=== Periodicals and online sources ===
- Gontar, Cybele (October 2006), "Art Nouveau", Heilbrunn Timeline of Art History (Essays), New York: The Metropolitan Museum of Art
- Maho Sakoda (29 February 2016). "Liberty and Japonism". Victorian Culture Online – The online platform of the Journal of Victorian Culture. ISSN 1355-5502.
- "Exposition Alexandre Charpentier (1856–1909). Naturalisme et Art Nouveau". Musée d'Orsay (in French). 2008. Archived from the original on 4 March 2016.
