= Beckerath (surname) =

von Beckerath is a surname. Many people carrying the name are members of the noble German Mennonite Beckerath family.

- Hermann von Beckerath (1801–1870), banker and Prussian statesman
- Jürgen von Beckerath (1920–2016), German Egyptologist
- Moritz von Beckerath (1838–1896), painter ofrom the Düsseldorf school of painting
- Rudolf von Beckerath (1907–1976), master organ builder (son of Willy)
  - Rudolf von Beckerath Orgelbau
- Willy von Beckerath (1868–1938), painter and art professor (father of Rudolf)
