= Kurt Schlosser =

Kurt Schlosser (18 October 1900 – 16 August 1944 in Dresden) was a German cabinet-maker, climber, and an active Communist.

During his training in cabinet making, he lost an arm. He nevertheless built up a climbing group with some young, working-class sportsmen and was a member of the woodworkers' association and the "Naturfreunde" hiking club.

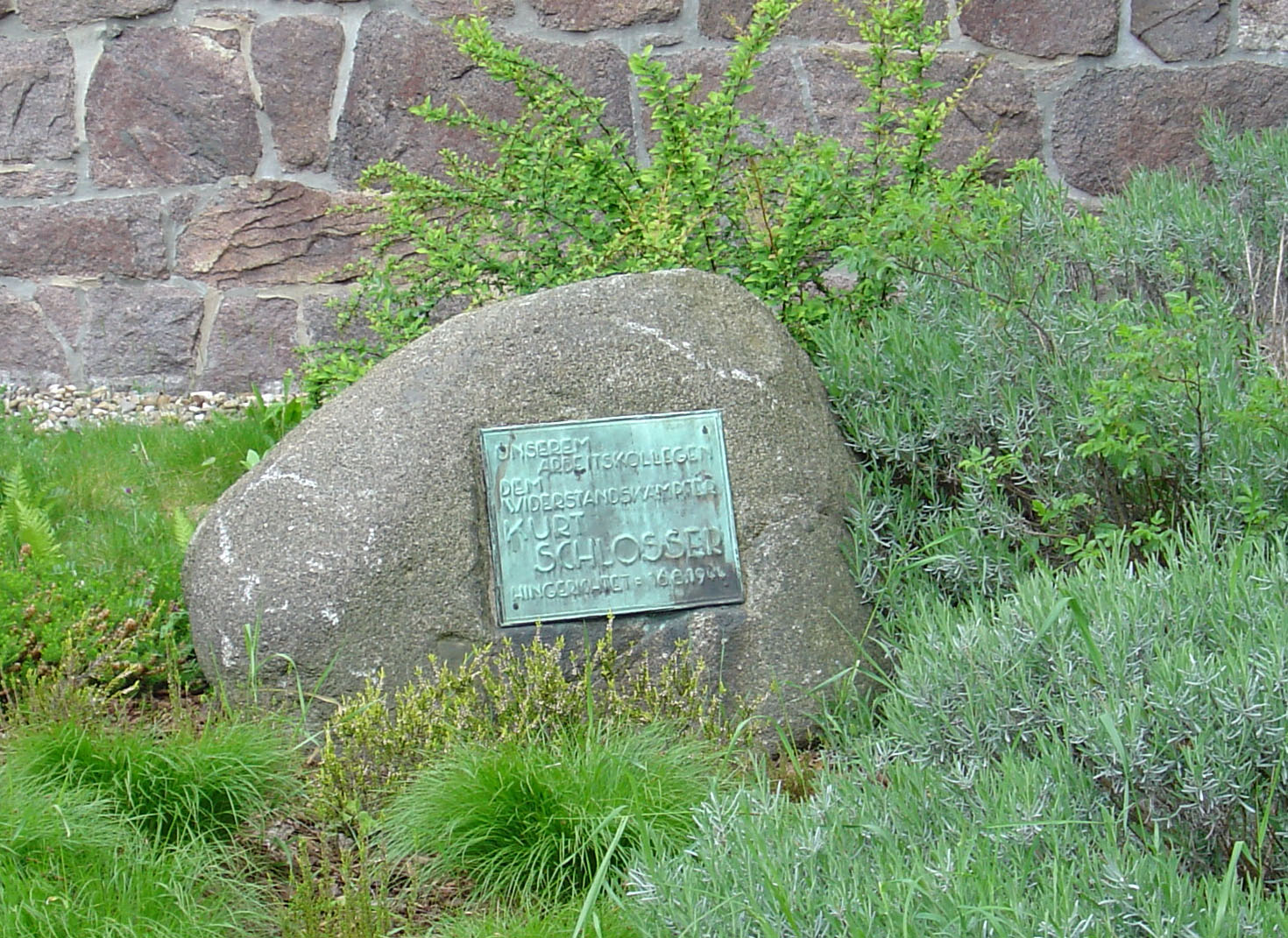
Kurt Schlosser memorial stone before the Hellerau German Workshops (Dresden); the caption simply reads "To our work colleague, the resistance fighter Kurt Schlosser, executed 16.8.1944"

Between 1919 and 1923, Schlosser worked as a polisher, stainer and assembler in the " Hellerau German Workshops" ("Deutsche Werkstätten Hellerau"), and was also a member of the works council there. In 1923, he joined the Communist Party of Germany (KPD), he belonged to the KPD factory cell and the Revolutionary Trade Union Opposition (Revolutionäre Gewerkschafts-Opposition) at the Deutsche Werkstätten Hellerau. In 1930, he was finally rebuked as a Communist works councillor and barred from the woodworkers' association. Before the labour court, he struggled to keep working at the Workshops.

Since Schlosser was a member of the strike leadership in 1931, it was within the Workshops' power to exclude him, which led to him losing his job. Not long afterwards, however, he had set up his own cabinet-making workshop on Leipziger Straße in Dresden. He was also leader of the choir of the United Climbing Companies, which later became the "Sächsischer Bergsteigerchor 'Kurt Schlosser' Dresden" ("Kurt Schlosser Saxon Mountaineers' Choir, Dresden").

From 1933, Schlosser was active with other mountain climbers in illegal "border work". His cabinet-making workshop became a meeting place for resistance fighters who were struggling against the Nazi régime. There arose a tight connection between German and Czechoslovak working-class sportsmen.

Kurt Schlosser contributed to the civic singing club "Melomanie" and the "Meißner Hochland" section of the German Alpine Club (Deutscher Alpenverein).

From 1942 Schlosser was a member of the leadership of the illegal Dresden KPD organization, now newly established after countless arrests, and he forged new connections with illegally active trade union representatives from Dresden and nearby areas.

On 3 December 1943, Kurt Schlosser and other active antifascists were arrested. On 30 June 1944 at the Volksgerichtshof, together with his comrades Herbert Blochwitz, Otto Galle and Arthur Weineck, he was sentenced to death for "high treason and favouring the enemy". On 16 August 1944, Kurt Schlosser was beheaded in the courtyard of the Dresden State Court at Münchner Platz.

The Sächsischer Bergsteigerchor 'Kurt Schlosser' Dresden has borne the murdered antifascist's name since 1949.

== Literature ==
- Zimmering, M.: Widerstandsgruppe Vereinigte Kletterabteilungen. Berlin 1948.
