= Richard Riemerschmid =

German architect, painter, designer, and city planner (1868–1957)

- Born: 20 June 1868; Munich
- Died: 13 April 1957 (aged 88); Munich
- Occupations: Architect, painter, designer, urban planner, photographer, handicrafter, pedagogue, engineer
- Spouse: Ida Riemerschmid
- Children: Ilse Pfleiderer, Gerhart Riemerschmid

House designed c. 1905, Dresden, Germany

Richard Riemerschmid (20 June 1868 – 13 April 1957) was a German architect, painter, designer and city planner from Munich. He was a major figure in Jugendstil, the German form of Art Nouveau, and a founder of architecture in the style. A founder member of both the Vereinigte Werkstätte für Kunst im Handwerk (United Workshops for Art in Handcrafts) and the Deutscher Werkbund and the director of art and design institutions in Munich and Cologne, he prized craftsmanship but also pioneered machine production of artistically designed objects.

== Life and career ==
Riemerschmid was born in Munich, the sixth of nine children of Eduard Riemerschmid, who headed the Munich distillery founded by his father Anton Riemerschmid, and his wife Amalie. After completing his Abitur at the Wilhelmsgymnasium in 1886 and military service in the army, he studied at the Academy of Fine Arts, Munich under Gabriel Hackl and Ludwig von Löfftz from 1888 to 1890 and then worked as an independent artist and architect.

He began as an Impressionist and Symbolist painter. He produced advertising of various kinds on commission, including series of pictures for albums for the Stollwerck chocolate company of Cologne, one called "The Seasons" (Jahreszeiten) for Album No. 4 of 1899.

He was a co-founder of the Vereinigte Werkstätten für Kunst im Handwerk (United Workshops for Art in Handcrafts) (1897 or 1898, originally Dresdner Werkstätten für Handwerkskunst, later Deutsche Werkstätten für Handwerkskunst and now Deutsche Werkstätten Hellerau) and the Deutscher Werkbund (1907), which he headed from 1920 to 1926. From 1913 to 1924, he was director of the Munich Kunstgewerbeschule (which merged with the Academy of Fine Arts in 1946), and from 1926 to 1931 was a professor at and the director of the Kölner Werkschulen (an art and design college which was a forerunner of the Academy of Media Arts Cologne). He played an important role in the 1922 German Handcrafts Exhibition in Munich. He published books on art education.

Riemerschmid paved the way for the modern artistic handcrafts movement. Influenced by the English Arts and Crafts movement, he created furniture, carpets, fabric and wallpaper designs and glass and porcelain pieces. In all of these his guiding principles were "objective clarity and purpose, solid craftsmanship and the use of simple, inexpensive materials". He created several interior designs, including for the Munich Kammerspiele (1900/1901). With Joseph Maria Olbrich and his friend and colleague Bruno Paul, he designed the 30 luxury cabins of the fast ocean liner SS Kronprinzessin Cecilie, launched in 1906, at the time one of the most ambitious and successful German passenger vessels, and he, Paul, and Johann Poppe, house designer for the North German Lloyd Line, were to have co-designed the interiors of the never finished SS Columbus of 1914. The furniture in his 1899 show interiors was praised for its style, for varying the repetitive verticals by adding a diagonal note to the framing of a glass-fronted cabinet and having chairs taper upwards from a broad base, and above all for remaining true to simplicity. He began designing furniture because he could not find what he wanted for his flat after his marriage. In 1903–04 he designed a dinner and coffee service for Meissen porcelain, part of their attempt to incorporate art nouveau designs; it was well received by the critics but did not sell well, although some were also sold through the Workshops. It has been reissued as Blaue Rispe (blue meadow-grass).

Riemerschmid designed the site plan, the factory and some of the housing for Hellerau (now part of Dresden), which was the first garden city of the English type to be built in Germany. As an architect, he is known particularly for his houses: his own house in Munich, the Villa Fischel in Kiel, the Fieser villa in Baden-Baden, and the Frank villa in Göttingen and country house in Witzenhausen, and for the uncompleted "Walddorfstraße" workers' housing complex in Hagen, Westphalia, although his major contribution to Jugendstil architecture was his interior for the Munich Schauspielhaus (playhouse; later the Kammerspiele).

At the United Workshops in Hellerau, Riemerschmid developed a programme of machine production of art furniture. For example, a chair in his "music room" exhibit at the German Art Exhibition in Dresden in 1899 was so popular, the Workshops immediately placed it in production, it was also being manufactured and sold by Liberty's the next year, and it was widely copied. He subsequently expanded this to the production of house kits. One such house, ordered in 1922 at an exhibition and erected in 1923 in Rodenkirchen near Cologne from 4,000 parts, mostly wood but including tiles and heating stoves, was disassembled and stored in Leverkusen in 1978. In 1984 the State of North Rhine-Westphalia declared it a landmark, and research revealed that it was the only example of the model ever built. A grandchild of the original purchaser had the pieces moved in 2004 to Simbach am Inn, Bavaria and reassembled there at considerable cost, assisted by the Deutsche Stiftung Denkmalschutz (German Foundation for Landmark Protection).

In 1895, Riemerschmid married the actress Ida Hofmann. They had four children. In 1910, his sister Frieda became the second wife of Karl Schmidt-Hellerau, the founder of the United Workshops.

After the Nazi regime came to power in 1933, Riemerschmid was forced out of the Werkbund, and in 1943 Hitler forbade the award of the Goethe Medal for Art and Science to him as urged by Albert Speer. However, he did receive the medal on 20 July that year.

He is buried in the cemetery at Gräfelfing, which he laid out in 1913. His drawings are in the architectural museum at the Technical University of Munich and his other papers in the German Art Archive of the Germanisches Nationalmuseum in Nuremberg. The Richard-Riemerschmid-Berufskolleg, a vocational school in Cologne, is named for him in memory of his direction of the Kölner Werkschulen.

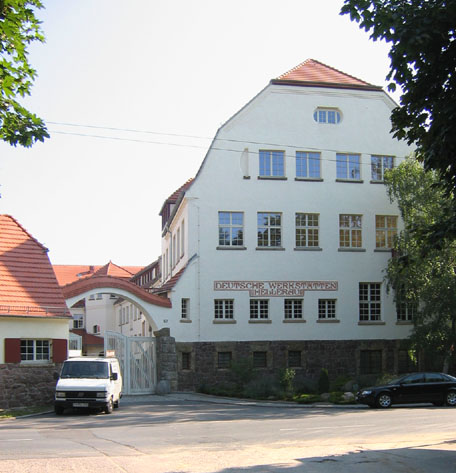
Deutsche Werkstätten für Handwerkskunst, Hellerau

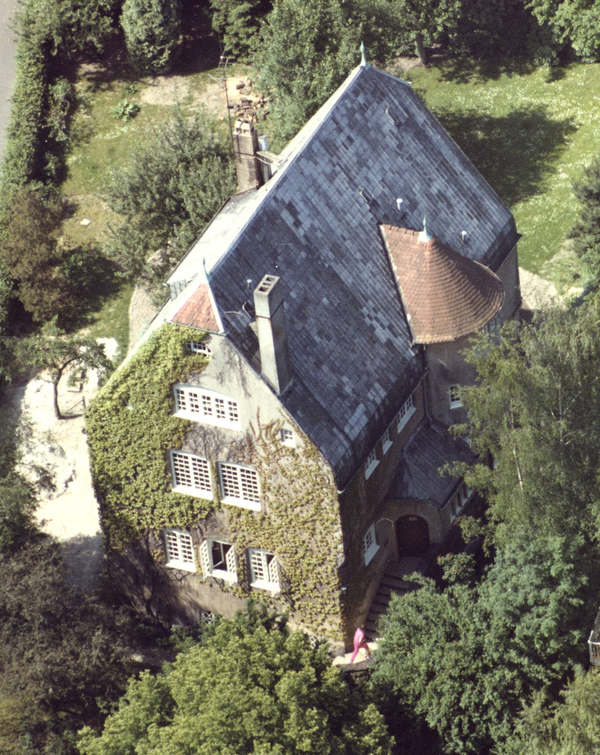
Fischel villa, Kiel

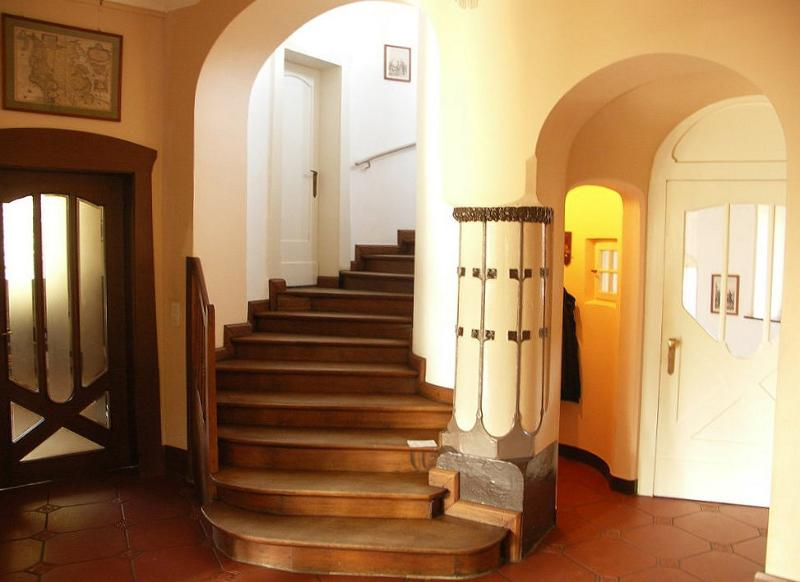
Staircase in Fischel villa

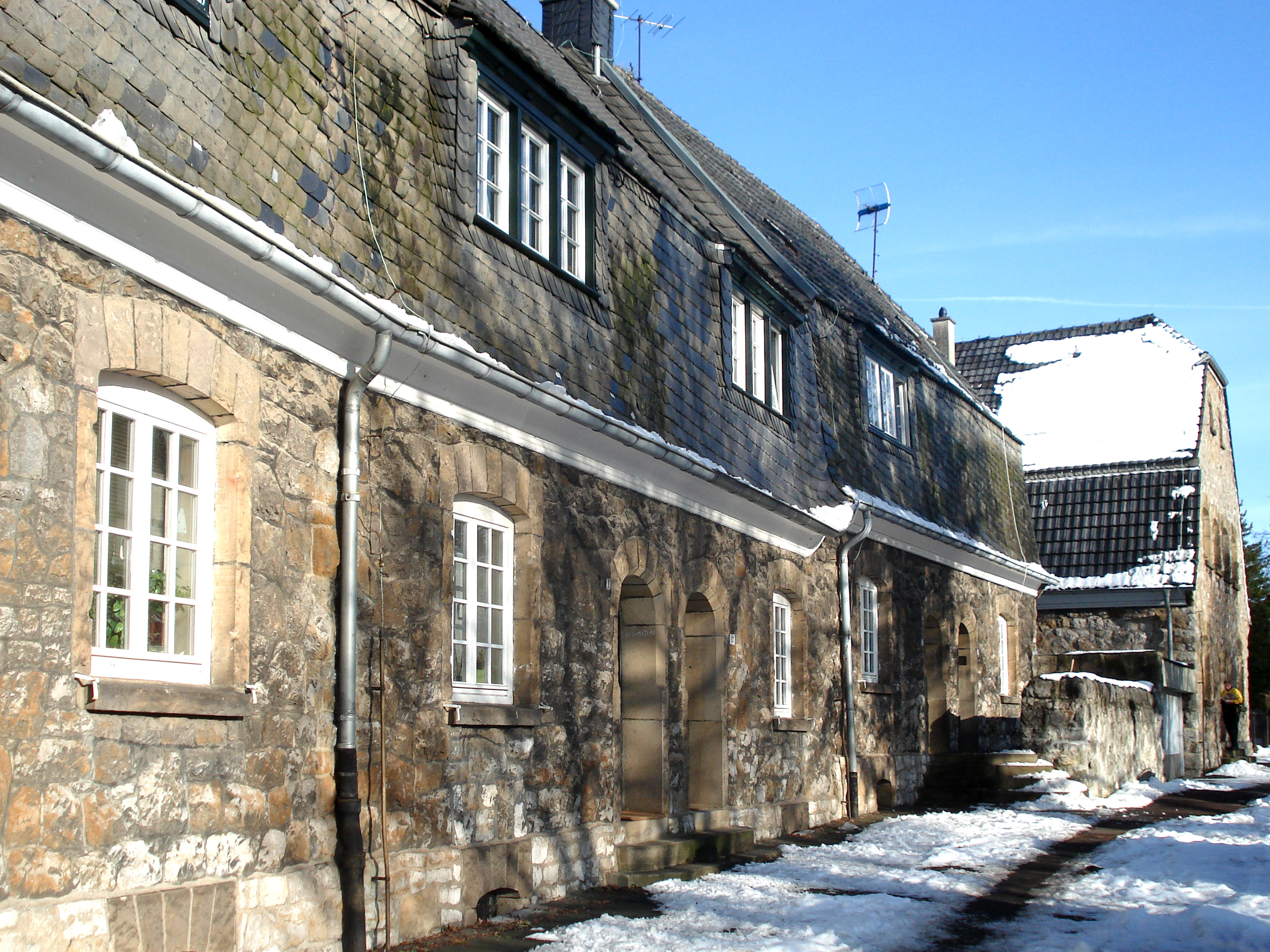
Workers' houses in Walddorfstraße, Hagen

Beach chair by Riemerschmid and Theodor Reimann, Dresden, Germany, c. 1905 (Museum für Angewandte Kunst, Cologne, Germany

Pair of brass candle holders, 1898

Boccale, 1902

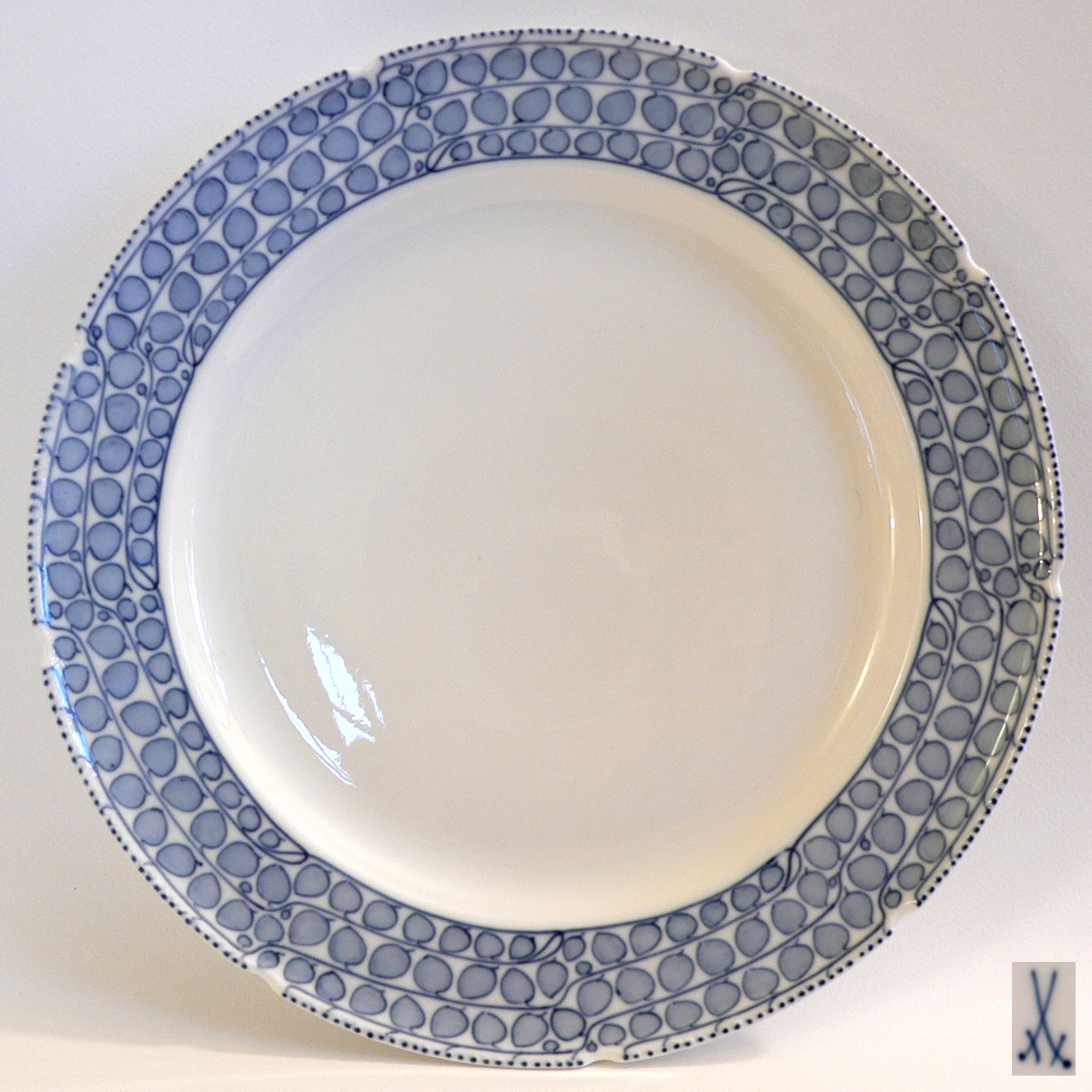
Dinner plate from Riemerschmid's table service for Meissen, now known as Blaue Rispe

== Selected works ==
- 1898–1906: Personal villa in the style of an English cottage, Pasing, Munich. Later extensions: studio and connecting building. Furnishings removed in 2010.
- 1899: "Music salon" interior, shown at the German Art Exhibition in Dresden
- 1900: "The art-lover's room" interior, shown at the Paris Exposition of 1900
- 1901: Interior design of the Schauspielhaus (later the Kammerspiele) in Munich (architect: Max Littmann)
- 1902: House for Alfred Mailick at Bahnhofstraße 17, Moritzburg, Saxony
- 1902–1903: Fieser villa in Baden-Baden
- 1904: "Rector's room at the Industrial School in Nuremberg" interior, shown at the 1904 World's Fair in St. Louis
- 1904–05: Fischel villa in Kiel
- 1905: Rudolph villa in Dresden (destroyed)
- 1905–06: Sultan villa in Grunewald, Berlin, commissioned in 1904 by Berlin industrialist Adolf Sultan, father of pianist Grete Sultan; demolished 1965.
- 1906: Frank villa in Göttingen
- 1906: Fritz Frank country house in Witzenhausen
- 1907–10: Walddorfstraße Workers' Settlement for Hagener Textilindustrie Gebrüder Elbers AG in Hagen (only 11 houses built of the planned 87 buildings)
- 1909–10: Scholten villa in Duisburg (demolished)
- 1909–11: Manufacturing plant, Deutsche Werkstätten für Handwerkskunst, Moritzburger Weg 67, Hellerau, Dresden
- 1909–11: Hoffmann villa in Halle
- 1909–13: Wieland villa in Ulm
- 1910: "Dining room" and "lady's chamber" interiors, shown at the 1910 International Exposition in Brussels
- 1910–12: Schwalten villa at Schwaltenweiher, Ostallgäu
- 1910–12: Carl villa, for the publisher Hans Carl, Höhenbergstraße 35, Feldafing
- 1911: Naumann villa in Riesa
- 1914: Interior design and furniture for the villa in the Werkbund exhibition at Cologne
- 1922: Factory building for Anton Riemerschmid Liquors on Prater Island, Munich
- 1924: War memorial, Schloßstraße, Ismaning
- 1925: Exhibition hall at the German Transport Exhibition in Munich
- 1928: Pavilion for Hermann Reckendorf GmbH, publisher, at the "Pressa" international press exhibition in Cologne
- 1928–29: Schaffer villa in Klingenmünster
- 1929–31: Wefelscheid villa in Bendorf

== Selected publications ==
- Wege und Irrwege unserer Kunsterziehung. Berlin: Reckendorf, [1917]
- Künstlerische Erziehungsfragen. Flugschriften des Münchner Bundes. 2 vols. Munich: Müller, 1917, 1919

== Honours ==
- 1914: Geheimrat, Kingdom of Bavaria
- 1924: Geheimer Regierungsrat, Bavaria
- 1943: Goethe-Medaille für Kunst und Wissenschaft
- 1951: City of Munich architecture prize
- 1952: Großes Bundesverdienstkreuz (Commander)
- 1952: City of Munich grand prize for art
- 1954: Honorary membership in the Academy of Fine Arts, Munich
- 1955: Honorary doctorate in engineering, Technische Hochschule Stuttgart, now the University of Stuttgart

== Sources ==
- Michaela Rammert-Götz. Richard Riemerschmid, Möbel und Innenräume von 1895–1900. Schriften aus dem Institut für Kunstgeschichte der Universität München 22. Munich: Tuduv, 1987. ISBN 978-3-88073-253-7 (in German)
- Bernhard Graf. Richard Riemerschmid, Bayerischer Architekt zwischen Jugendstil und Werkbund. Documentary. Bayerischer Rundfunk 2006 (in German)
- Maria Wüllenkemper. Richard Riemerschmid: "Nicht die Kunst schafft den Stil, das Leben schafft ihn". Regensburger Studien zur Kunstgeschichte 6. Regensburg: Schnell & Steiner, 2009. ISBN 978-3-7954-2095-6 (in German)
- Detlef Lorenz. Reklamekunst um 1900. Künstlerlexikon für Sammelbilder. Berlin: Reimer, 2000. ISBN 978-3-496-01220-7 (in German)
- Thomas Nitschke. Die Geschichte der Gartenstadt Hellerau. Dresden: Hellerau, 2009. ISBN 978-3-938122-17-4 (in German)
- Freyja Hartzell. Richard Riemerschmid's Extraordinary Living Things. Cambridge, MA: The MIT Press, 2022. ISBN 978-0-26204742-5
