= Willy von Beckerath =

German painter and academic (1868–1938)

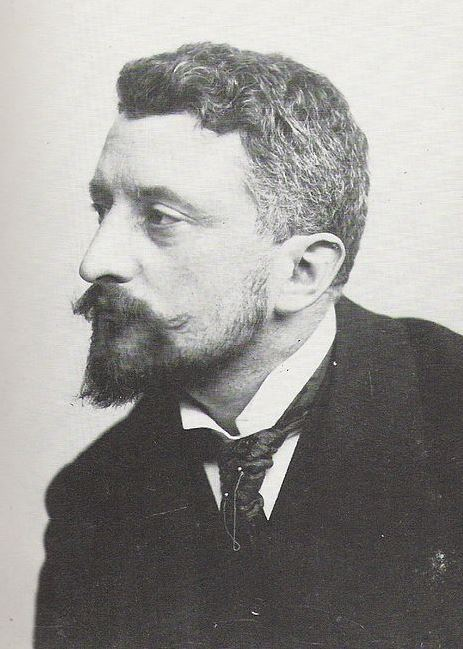
- Von Beckerath c. 1898
- Born: 28 September 1868; Krefeld, Kingdom of Prussia
- Died: 10 May 1938 (aged 69); Irschenhausen, Bavaria, Nazi Germany
- Education: Kunstakademie Düsseldorf
- Occupations: Painter; designer; academic teacher
- Organizations: Deutsche Werkstätten Hellerau; Staatliche Kunstgewerbeschule, Hamburg
- Works: Die ewige Welle (1918)
- Children: Hermann; Rudolf

Willy von Beckerath (28 September 1868 – 10 May 1938) was a German painter and art professor associated with the Düsseldorfer Malerschule. He was primarily known for portraits, landscapes and murals. From 1902, he was instrumental in the formation of the Deutsche Werkstätten Hellerau. He designed furniture and furnishings for churches. From 1907 to 1931, he was professor at the Staatliche Kunstgewerbeschule in Hamburg (now University of Fine Arts of Hamburg), where he decorated a new assembly hall with a monumental mural over three of its walls, Die ewige Welle (The Eternal Wave).

== Life and work ==
Von Beckerath was born in Krefeld. His family was involved in the textile industry. They were friends of Johannes Brahms, and Von Beckerath painted several portraits of the composer.

Von Beckerath studied at the Kunstakademie Düsseldorf from 1885 to 1895, with Heinrich Lauenstein, Hugo Crola, Adolf Schill and Peter Janssen. Following his graduation, he went to Munich. In 1896, he was awarded a small gold medal at the Große Berliner Kunstausstellung. He initially focused on religious art, but soon turned to mythological themes, influenced by Max Klinger.

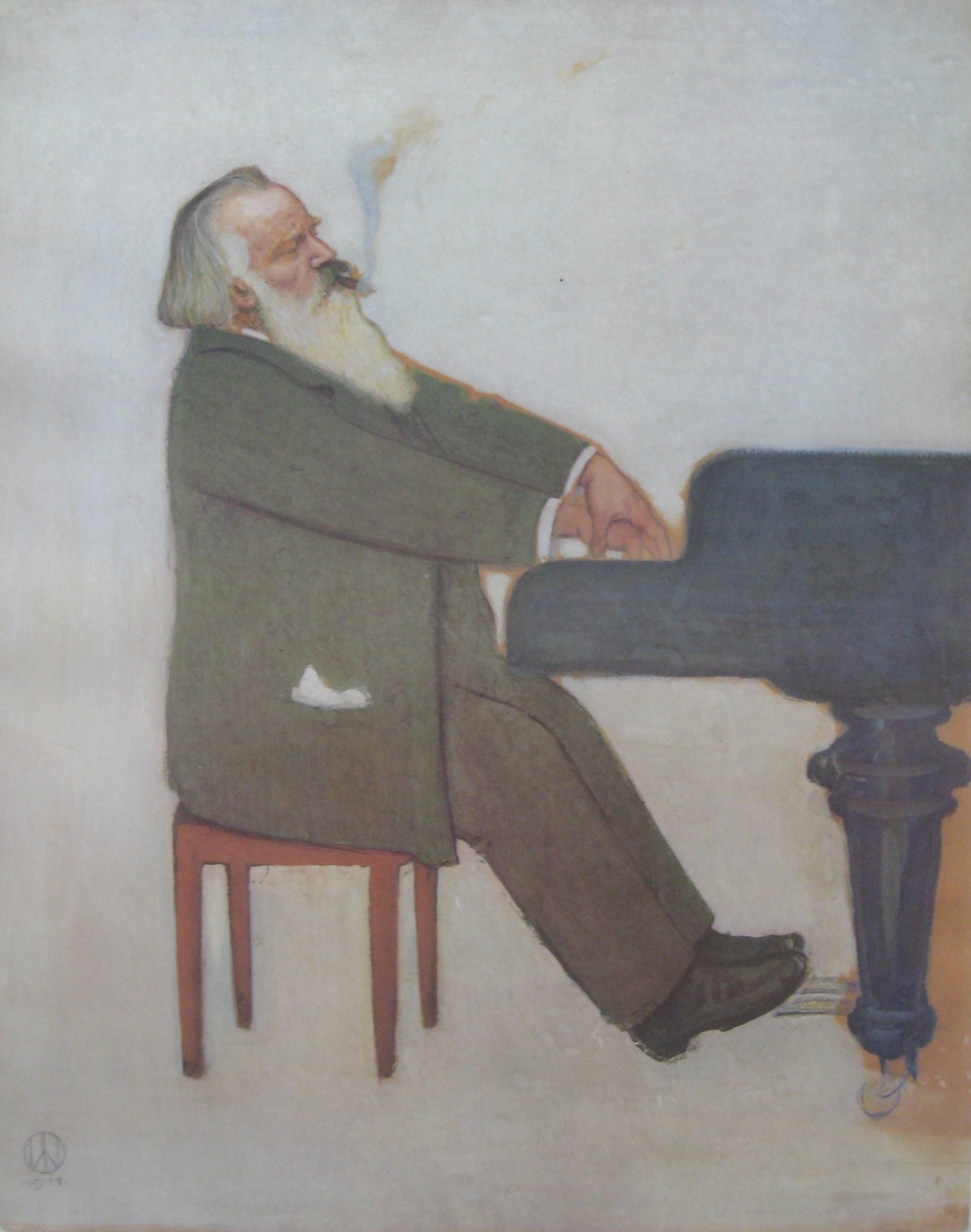
Brahms am Flügel, 1896

Von Beckerath made a charcoal drawing of Brahms at the piano with crossed hand in 1896, and a tempura painting of the motif in 1911. Brahms would often play his Rhapsody in G minor which features crossed hands.

He married Luise Schultz (1872–1958), a pianist, in 1899. They had two sons, Hermann who became a cellist with the Munich Philharmonic, and Rudolf who became a master organ builder.

In 1902, Von Beckerath co-founded, together with the architect Karl Bertsch (1873–1933) and Adelbert Niemeyer, the Münchner Werkstätten für Handwerkskunst, a workshop for craftsmanship in Munich. Five years later, it merged with the Dresdner Werkstätten für Handwerkskunst, owned by the furniture manufacturer Karl Schmidt-Hellerau, under the new name Deutsche Werkstätten Hellerau. Von Beckerath designed furniture and also furnishings for churches such as pews, confessionals, baptismal fonts, holy water basins and small sculptures. To optimise production, a company town named Hellerau was created outside of Dresden. It was conceived as a Catholic-social reform quarter.

Around the same time, the sculpture hall at the Kunsthalle Bremen was redesigned by the architects Carl Eeg and Eduard Runge (?-1944) with decorative wall panels by the stage designer Alexander von Salzmann. Murals for the panels were provided by Von Beckerath, after whom the hall was ultimately named. His mural in three parts depicts naked persons in a landscape, who pick fruits, make music, play or bathe. The colours are light and cool, to represent enjoyment and rest.

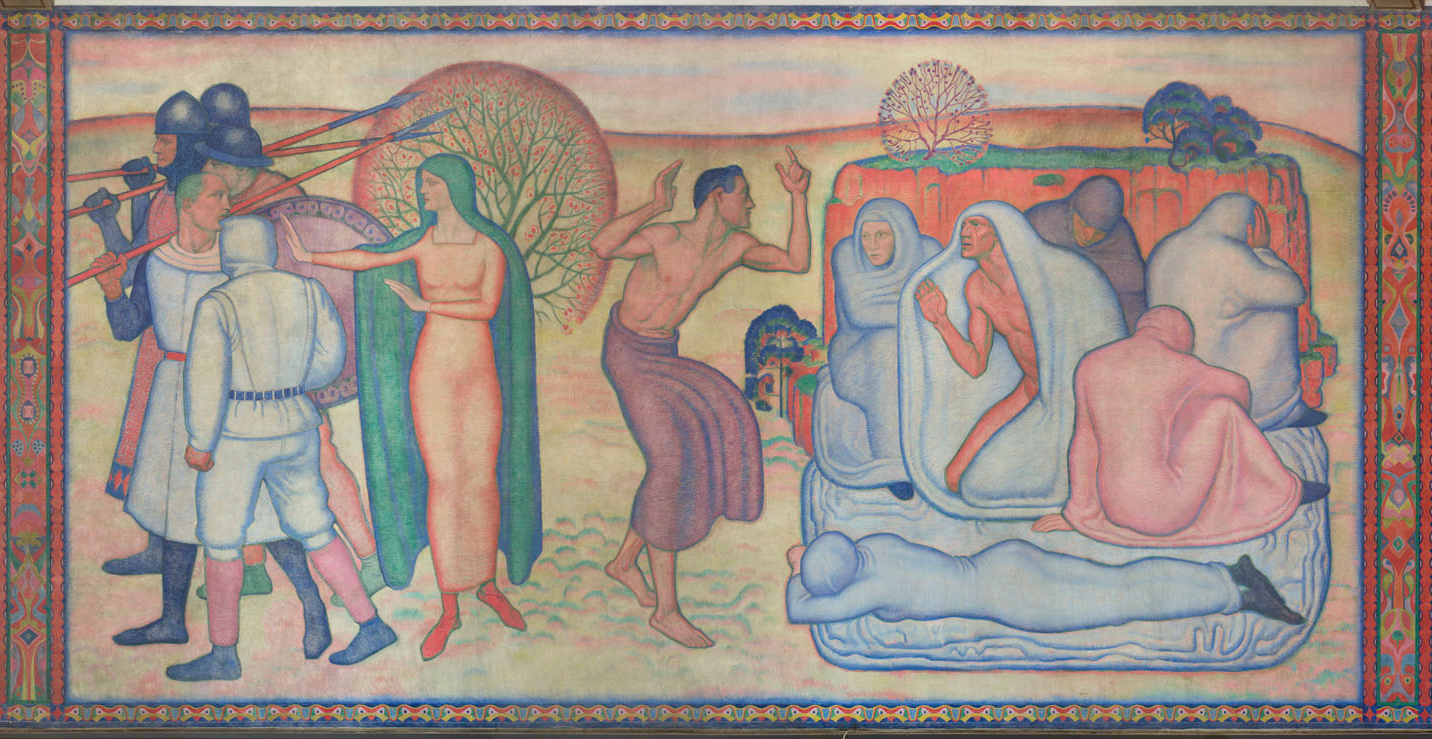
Verkündigung (Annunciation), part III of Die ewige Welle

From 1907 to 1931, he was professor of Figürliche Wandmalerei at the Staatliche Kunstgewerbeschule in Hamburg (now University of Fine Arts of Hamburg). Inspired by the reform movement, he tried to close the gap between "high" art and "low" applied art. A new school building, designed by Fritz Schumacher, was opened in 1913. From then until 1918, Beckerath worked on a large eight-part wall mural to decorate the Aula assembly hall. Titled Die ewige Welle (The Eternal Wave), it depicts the rise and fall of a human cultural era, rising and falling, in eight parts. The artwork forms a bond of architecture and painting, with the canvas mount in the wall. Considered to be his magnum opus, it was dedicated with a speech by the art historian and cultural theorist, Aby Warburg. Die ewige Welle was covered with monochrome plaster in the 1950s, but the whole Aula was restored over five years to its original appearance, for the centenary in 2013.

Von Beckerath made two large biblical paintings, Die Predigt des Johannes (The Sermon of St. John, 1907) and Kreuzigung (Crucifixion, 1910). He donated them in 1931 to the village church of Löwenberg. They could not be installed immediately, and after the Nazis assumed power in 1933, their style was no longer welcome.

Von Beckerath died in Irschenhausen at age 69.
