= Rudolf von Beckerath Orgelbau =

German organ building company

Rudolf von Beckerath Orgelbau is a German organ-building company based in Hamburg. It was founded in 1949 by Rudolf von Beckerath (born 19 February 1907 in Munich, died 22 November 1976).

== History ==
Rudolf von Beckerath was born in 1907 in Munich, the son of Willy von Beckerath, a painter, and Luise née Schultz, a pianist. Soon after his birth his parents moved to Hamburg. There he went to school and began training as a mechanical engineer, but then switched to organ building, being impressed by organs built by Arp Schnitger. On the recommendation of Hans Henny Jahnn, he finally went to France in 1929 to put the necessary finishing touches on his training at Victor Gonzales' organ-building in Châtillon-sous-Bagneux, near Paris. After completing his apprenticeship, he worked for a brief time with Frobenius Orgelbyggeri in Denmark, where he took part in building the great organ of the Church of Our Lady in Copenhagen.

In 1931 Gonzales asked him to return, and he became a partner in the company. However, in 1935, as a result of the French sanctions against German businesses and business people, he parted amicably from the Paris company and returned to Germany. There he initially worked as an independent consultant in Hamburg, designing the organ for the Christuskirche (Christ Church) in Othmarschen.

In 1938 he was appointed to an official position advising on organs and bells for the Reich Ministry for Ecclesiastical Affairs and in 1939 moved to Berlin.

In 1941 he was called up for military service in the Wehrmacht and in 1945 was captured by the Americans. Released in May 1946, he first returned to Munich, and resumed working as an organ consultant. His reports on numerous organs in North Germany in the post-war period are valuable documentation.

However, in 1949, he finally succeeded after many difficulties in passing his master's examination, required for him to work independently as an organ builder. His international career began in the 1950s.

Rudolf von Beckerath died in 1976 and the business was converted into a limited liability company headed by his wife and closest associates. Managing directors Helmut Kleemann and Herta Deichmann retired in 1987 and 1990 respectively, and Timm Sckopp, a former apprentice of von Beckerath, took over the management of the company. In 1995, von Beckerath's widow Veronika gave up control of the company: Sckopp handed over the organ-building division to Rolf Miehl, and Holger Redlich took over the business aspect. Both had been members of the board since 1995. In 2001, with assistance from the investor Whitney Reader, they bought out the business.
