= Kurt Schlosser Saxon Mountaineers' Choir =

Kurt Schlosser Saxon Mountaineers' Choir Sächsischer Bergsteigerchor "Kurt Schlosser" Dresden
- Choir
- Origin: Dresden / Germany
- Founded: 1927
- Genre: male voice choir
- Members: 140 (TTBB)
- Music director: Axel Langmann
- Website: www.bergsteigerchor.de

The Kurt Schlosser Saxon Mountaineers' Choir (German: Sächsische Bergsteigerchor "Kurt Schlosser" Dresden) was founded in 1927. The choir consists of 140 male voices. Amongst its repertoire are classical and contemporary works as well as traditional mountaineering, hiking, regional and folk songs.

== History ==
The choir was founded as the singing section of a tourist association known as Die Naturfreunde - Vereinigte Kletterabteilungen Sachsen/VKA in Dresden's Keglerheim. Its first director was Kurt Lauterbach and its first concert took place on 14 February 1928.

The Saxon Mountaineers' Choir has borne the name Kurt Schlosser since 10 September 1949. Schlosser, born in 1900, was himself a member of the VKA. During the Nazi era the choir was banned and many choir members performed illegally. Several climbers and members of the choir organised the Red Climbers under the direction of Kurt Schlosser in various Dresden factories as part of anti-Fascist resistance.

The Red Climbers (roten Bergsteiger) established themselves in Saxon Switzerland in a rock cave near the rock of the Satanskopf as a secret office and hiding place.

After being arrested on 3 December 1943 Kurt Schlosser was sentenced to the guillotine on 16 August 1944. Other climbers and choir members also became victims of Nazism.

With the demise of Nazism in 1945 the choir was re-founded, and renewed its musical activities.

== Videos ==
- „75 Jahre Sächsischer Bergsteigerchor „Kurt Schlosser“ Dresden“
- „Zauberhaftes Ost-Erzgebirge - Unterwegs zwischen Weesenstein und Zinnwald“
- „Bergheimat Oberlausitz - Eine Wanderung mit dem Bergsteigerchor ‚Kurt Schlosser‘“
- „Zum Gipfel empor - Faszinierendes Elbsandsteingebirge“

== Sources ==
- Works by and about the Kurt Schlosser Saxon Mountaineers' Choir in the German National Library catalogue
