= Trinity Lutheran Church (Cleveland) =

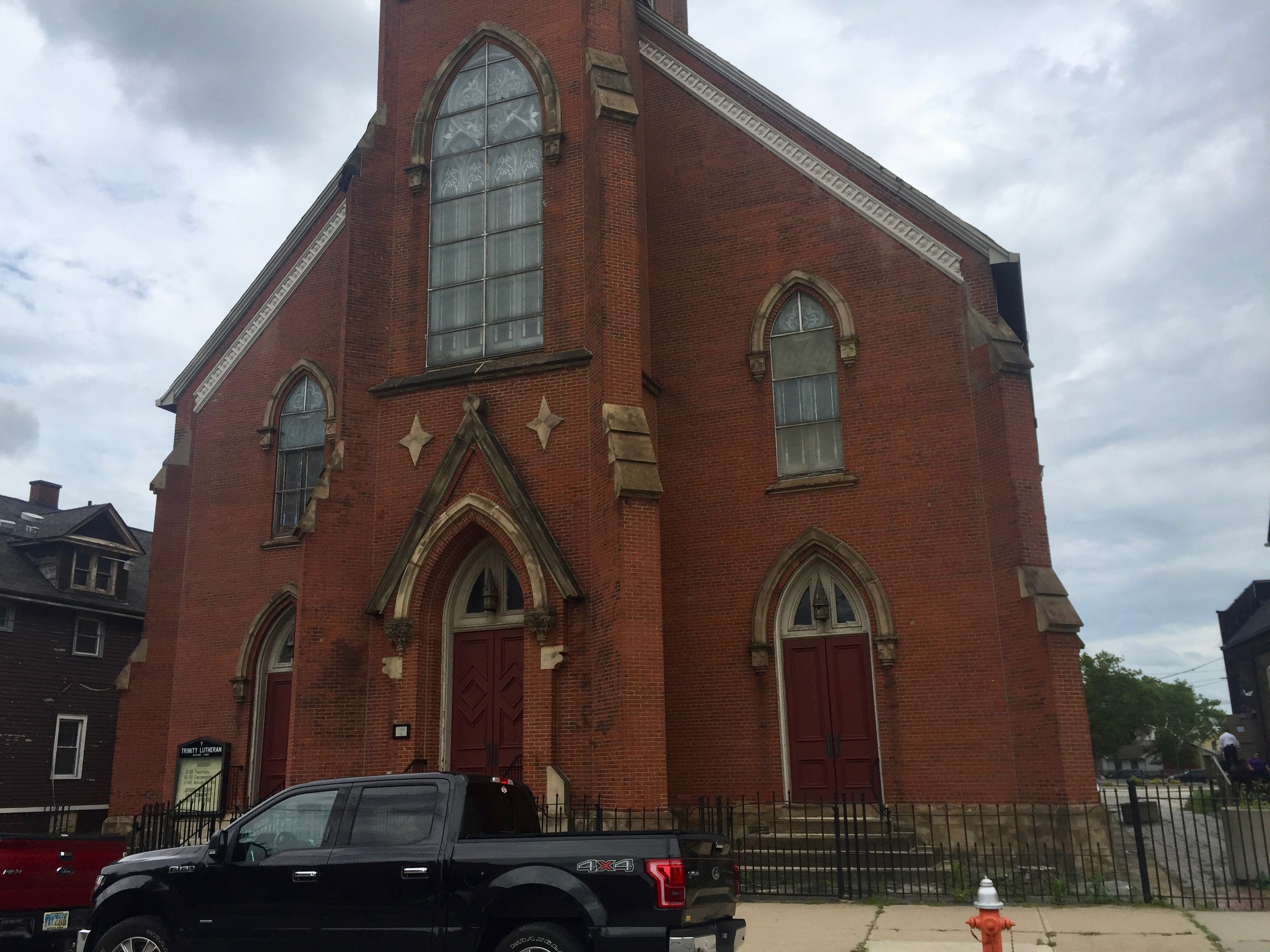
- Trinity Lutheran Church
- 41°28′55.5″N 81°42′23.3″W
- Location: 2031 W. 30th Street; Cleveland, Ohio
- Country: United States
- Denomination: Lutheran Church – Missouri Synod
- Website: trinityohiocity.org

History
- Status: Church
- Founded: 1853
- Founder: Rev. J. C. Lindemann

Architecture
- Functional status: Active
- Years built: 1873

Specifications
- Materials: Brick

Administration
- Division: Ohio District (LCMS)

Trinity Lutheran Church was founded in 1853 when a few members of Zion Lutheran Church in Cleveland, Ohio, decided to start a new congregation. J. C. Lindemann was the first pastor at Trinity. The current building used for worship was built in 1873 at the corner of Lorain Avenue and West 30th Street.

In 1956, the church became well known because of the Beckerath organ installed in that year. The organ was built in Hamburg, Germany, by Rudolf von Beckerath, a famous organ builder. It was the first "modern, encased mechanical-action instrument with traditional classical voicing" to be installed in America.

Trinity is a member of the Lutheran Church – Missouri Synod.
