= Disch-House =

Office building designed by Bruno Paul

Coordinates: 50°56′17″N 6°57′14.9″E

Disch-Haus is the name of an office and commercial building in the Cologne city center district, Brückenstraße 19/corner Herzogstraße 36.

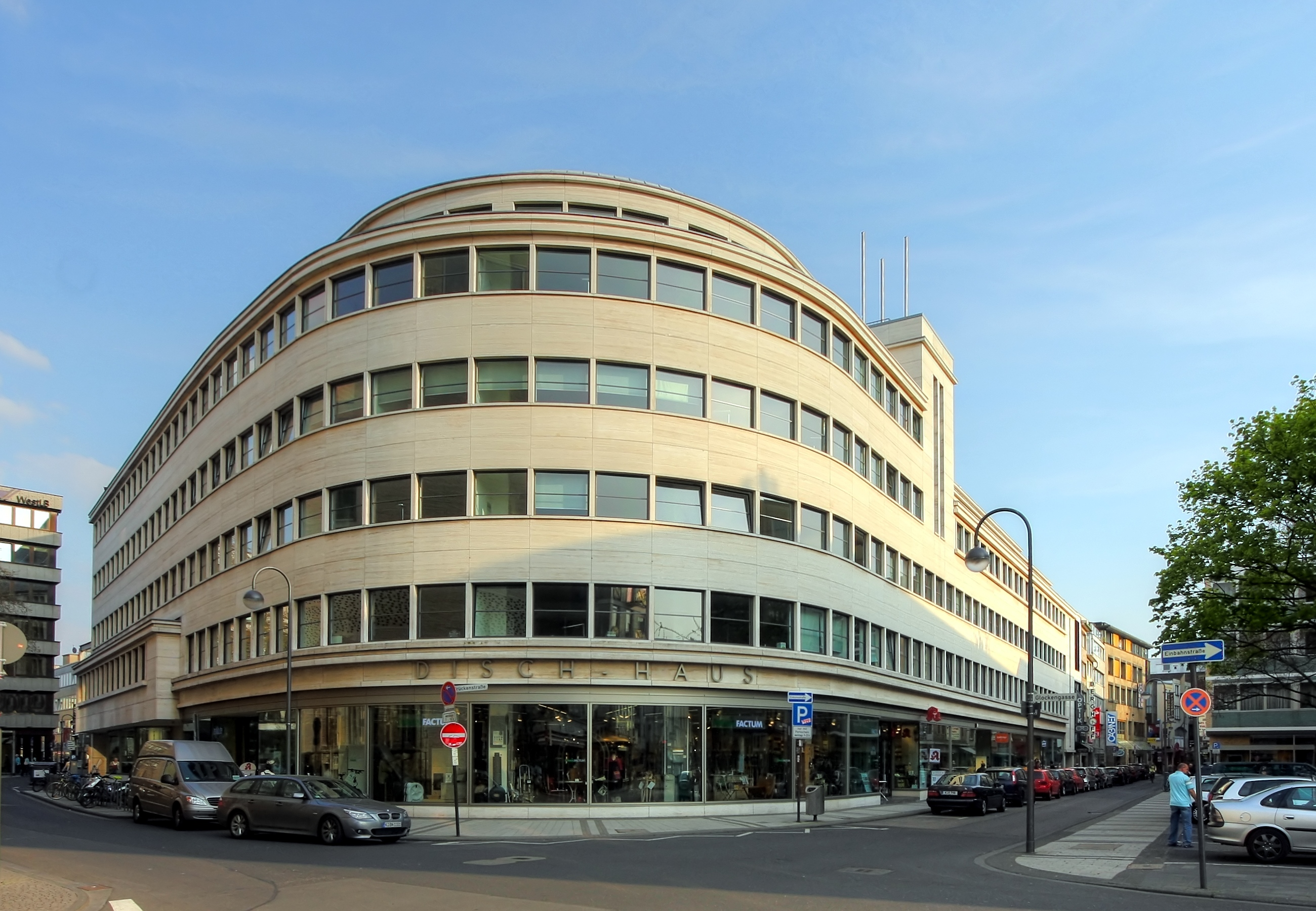
The Disch House in Cologne

== History of origins ==
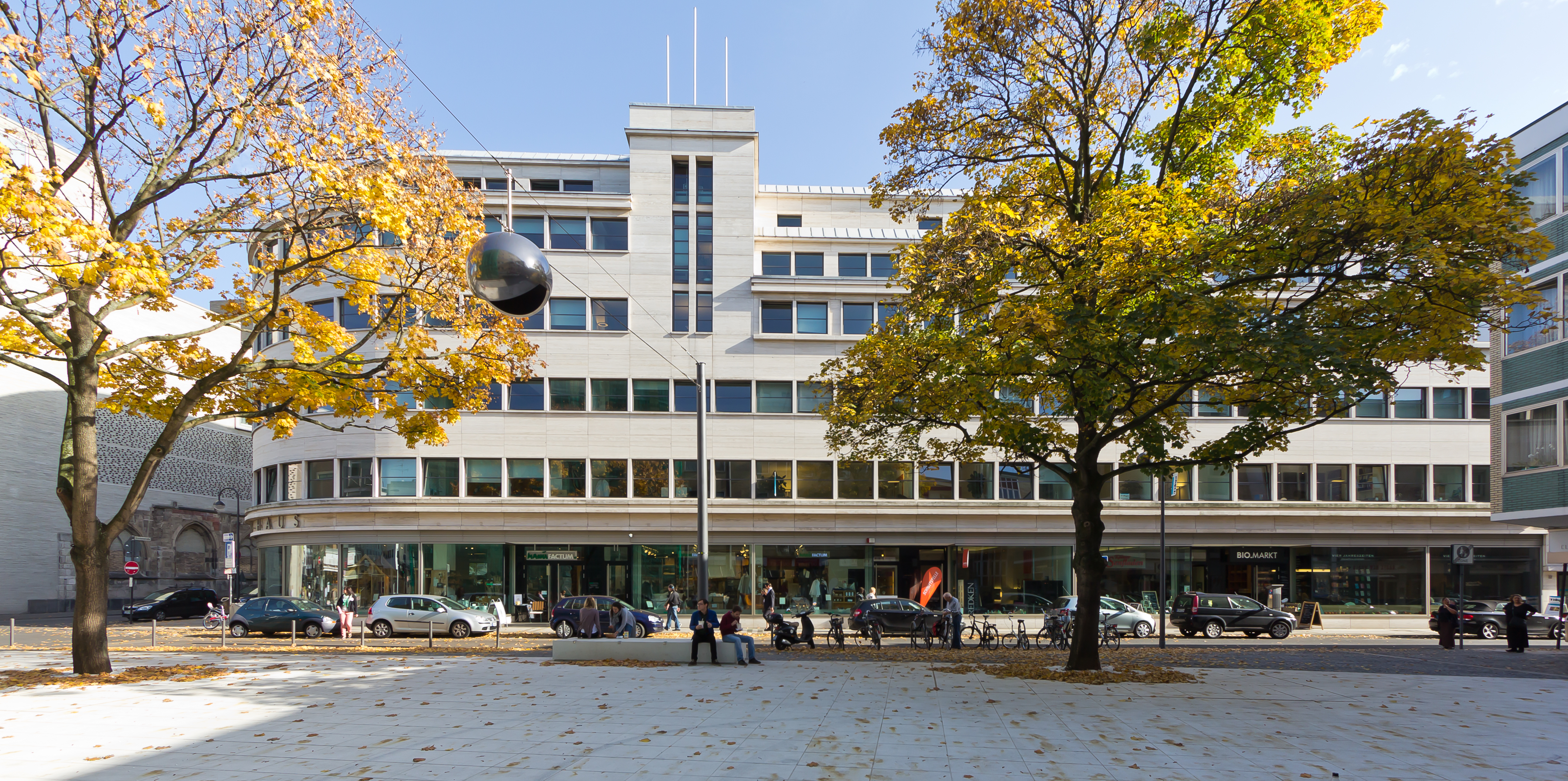
Fritz-Gruber-Platz – Disch-Haus

Disch-Haus takes its name from the "Hotel Disch", designed by Cologne architect Josef Felten and opened in October 1848 by Cologne art collector Franz Karl Damian Disch (born 1821; died 6 November 1880 in Cologne). The Cologne address book of 1846 listed Disch as an innkeeper. The magnificent building, with its rococo hall suitable for chamber music, was one of the most internationally renowned hotels in Cologne, as only the Dom-Hotel was in its category.

After Disch's death, the restorer Joseph Christoph from Frankfurt/Main acquired it at auction in May 1881. On 8 February 1890 the latter founded the operating company "Disch Hotel- und Verkehrs-AG", of which Peter Werhahn was a member of the supervisory board. A first reconstruction was carried out in 1890 by the architect team Heinrich Joseph Kayser and Karl von Großheim. Another reconstruction of the hotel took place in 1912.

The hotel hosted famous international guests and held important meetings. It was here that the first honorary citizen of Cologne, Franz Egon Graf von Fürstenberg-Stammheim, died of phlegm fever on 20 December 1859. In May 1914, the hotel hosted the delegates' meeting of the "Central Association of German Industrialists".

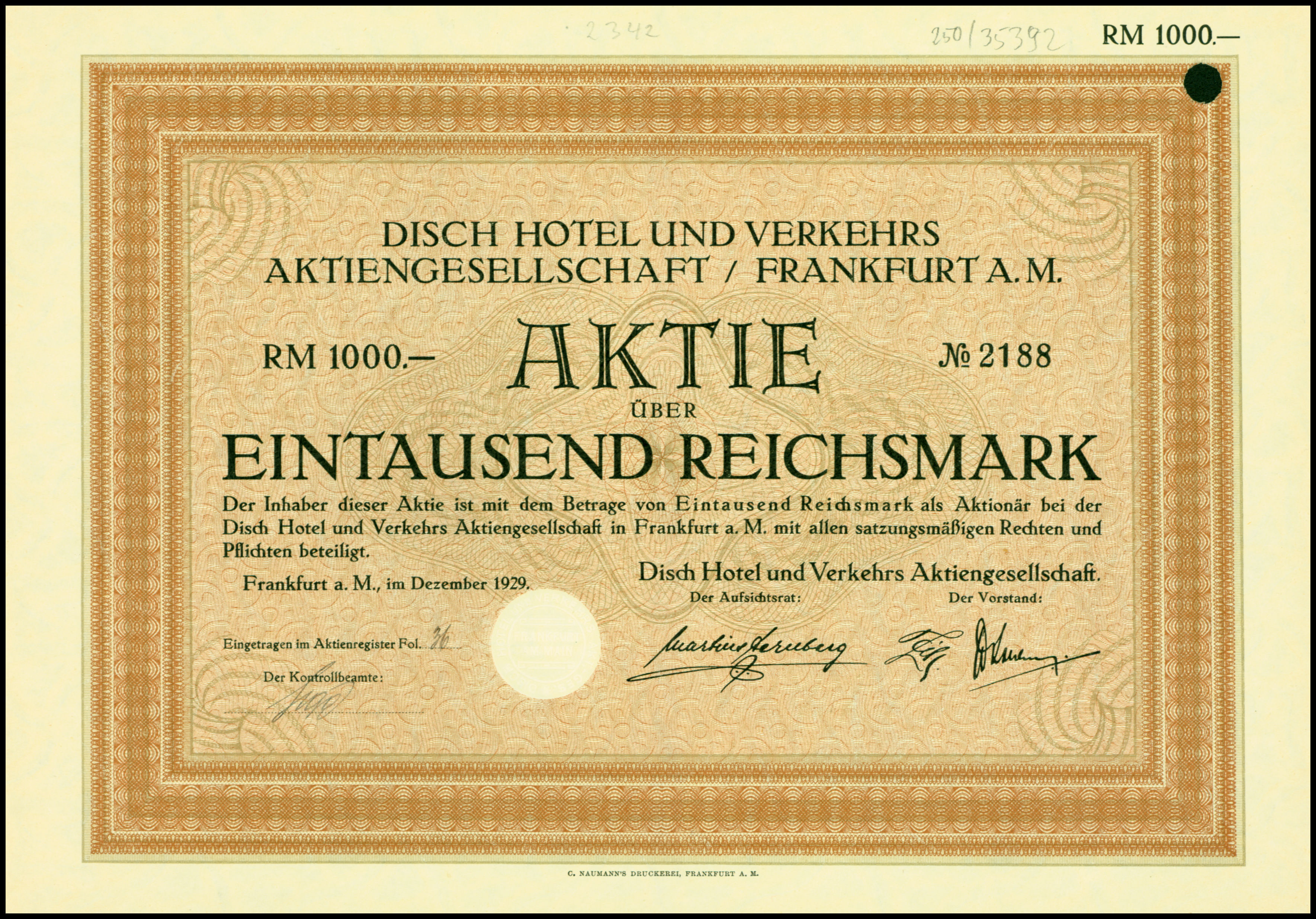
Disch Hotel und Verkehrs AG share from December 1929

Disch Hotel- und Verkehrs-AG" belonged to the circle of interests of Martin Sternberg, a banker living in Amsterdam. When Disch-AG went into insolvency, the banker Martin Sternberg owned a package of Disch shares, having sold his shares to the Düsseldorfer Baubank to cover a debit balance. The city acquired the hotel in 1928 from the insolvency of Disch-AG, which expired on 5 October 1929.

== Office building by Bruno Paul and Franz Weber ==
In July 1928, the architects Bruno Paul and Franz Weber won a design competition, announced by the "Disch Hotel- und Verkehrs-AG", for the construction of a monumental municipal administration building. The design was in the New Objectivity style as a round building with transverse bands of windows and a striking staircase. The window bands result in a horizontally structured round-arched facade, while the first floor is completely broken up into shop windows. It is considered the most important testimony of the New Objectivity in the cathedral city and one of the main works of the architect Bruno Paul. The building was also one of the first structures in which thin natural stone panels were curtained on a large scale. The inauguration took place on 1 February 1930. The top floor fell victim to an air raid during World War II, so that today only 5 floors remain. The building is now a listed monument.

== Change of ownership ==
The City of Cologne successively housed the Real Estate Office, the City Conservator, the Citizens' Office for the City Center, the Social Welfare Office and the Audit Office in the building. In November 2005, the City of Cologne sold the Disch-Haus to a consortium consisting of the Swiss real estate fund UBS, Colonia Real Estate AG and Redos Real Estate GmbH for 18.3 million euros. The consortium then refurbished the building and leased the 7700 m² of office space, winning the Westphalian mail order company Manufactum as an anchor tenant. The pedestal-driven Schindler paternoster elevator installed in 1952 is one of five paternosters still permitted in Cologne and survived the renovations in the Disch building.

In December 2008, the building became the property of the Bayerische Versorgungskammer for 40 million euros.

== Links ==
- http://www.koelnarchitektur.de/pages/de/home/news_archiv/2317.htm
- http://www.baukunst-nrw.de/objekte/Disch-Haus-Koeln--1210.htm

== Literature ==
- Drebusch, Thomas (2019). Bruno Paul - Schönheit ist Freude. Bruno Paul. Soest. ISBN 978-3-9820169-5-5. OCLC 1108913280.
