= Bruno Paul =

German architect (1874–1968)

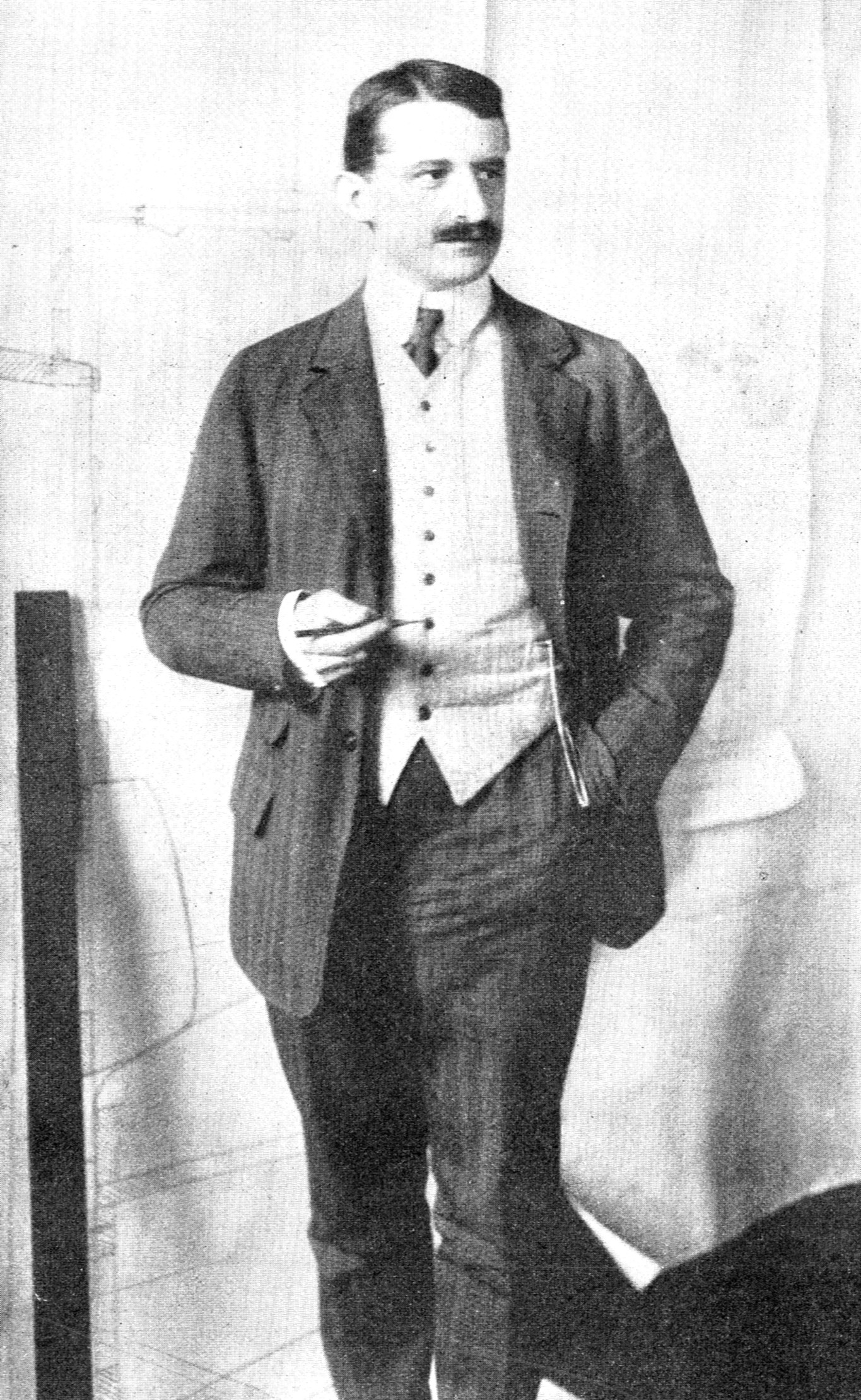
Bruno Paul, 1907 or before

Bruno Paul (19 January 1874 – 17 August 1968) was a German architect, illustrator, interior designer, and furniture designer.

Trained as a painter in the royal academy just as the Munich Secession developed against academic art, he first came to prominence as a cartoonist and illustrator in the German fin de siècle magazine Jugend, and in the satirical Simplicissimus from 1897 through 1906, in the years where its criticism of Wilhelm II brought prosecutions from the government.

By 1907, Paul became one of the founding members of the Deutscher Werkbund, and had launched multiple careers in industrial design, interior design (notably, for Norddeutscher Lloyd's ocean liners), furniture design, and architecture. His work of the time reflects a historic stylistic transition from the curved shapes and floral imagery of Jugendstil to simpler forms, straighter lines, and an adaptation to machine production methods. By 1907, Paul had also been appointed Director of the state school for decorative arts in Munich, hired despite his earlier criticisms.

Through the next years, on parallel tracks, Paul pursued both educational reforms in applied art and large commercial architectural commissions, for example, Berlin's first high-rise, the Kathreiner-Haus of 1930. Paul's career effectively ended with the rise of National Socialism.

Among Paul's students and apprentices were Mies van der Rohe, Kem Weber, and Adolf Meyer.

== Early career ==
Paul was born in Seifhennersdorf, a village in rural Saxony, in 1874. His father was an independent tradesman, craftsman, and dealer in building materials. At twelve years old, Paul left Seifhennersdorf for Dresden, where he briefly attended Gymnasium before entering a teacher's training school. By 1892, he was determined to pursue a career in the arts. In 1893 he was accepted as a student at the Saxon Academy of Fine Arts.

In 1894, Paul moved to Munich, the artistic capital of Wilhelmine Germany. He enrolled at the Academy of Fine Arts, Munich as a student of the painter Paul Hoecker, one of the primary figures of the Munich Secession. Hoecker provided Paul's introduction to the city's circle of progressive artists, which included his classmates Reinhold Max Eichler, Max Feldbauer, Walter Georgi, Angelo Jank, Walter Püttner, Leo Putz, and Ferdinand von Rezniçek.

In 1896, Paul left the Academy to begin an independent career. After working briefly as a studio painter, he won lasting renown as an illustrator and caricaturist. He was a regular contributor to Jugend, the magazine from which Jugendstil derived its name. The leading figures of this movement, including Peter Behrens, Bernhard Pankok, and Richard Riemerschmid, as well as the majority of the founding members of the Munich Secession, provided illustrations to Jugend. After 1897, Paul joined the staff of the satirical magazine Simplicissimus. Paul's weekly contributions to Simplicissimus between 1897 and 1906 won him international acclaim.

== Jugendstil ==
In 1898, Paul, together with Behrens, Pankok, and Riemerschmid, was working as an applied artist. He was a leading figure in the development of Jugendstil, and quickly established himself as the premier designer for the Vereinigte Werkstätten für Kunst im Handwerk (United Workshops for Art in Craftwork), which produced housewares in Munich. The Jugendstil Hunter's Room he designed for the Vereinigte Werkstätten in 1900 received a gold medal at the 1900 Paris International Exposition and was the first of a series of prestigious commissions that won widespread professional admiration. He won another gold medal at the 1904 Louisiana Purchase Exposition in St. Louis, introducing his interior designs to a broad American audience. In 1906, Paul designed a festival decoration for a barracks in Munich, his first commission on an architectural scale. His design (perhaps apocryphally) impressed Kaiser Wilhelm II and facilitated his appointment to the vacant directorship of the Unterrichtsanstalt des königlichen Kunstgewerbemuseum Berlin (Teaching Institute of the Royal Museum of Decorative Arts).

Paul's appointment in Berlin was part of a wider program of educational reforms promoted by Hermann Muthesius and Wilhelm von Bode. Paul, who was a member of the Munich Secession and the Berlin Secession as well as being one of the twelve artists who founded the German Werkbund, proved to be a committed reformer. He revised the curriculum of the Unterrichtsanstalt to promote practical craftsmanship as the basis of artistic education. He emphasised the training of professional designers for the applied arts industries, establishing a precedent that continues in schools of design to the present day.

As a designer, Bruno Paul provided more than 2,000 furniture patterns to the Vereinigte Werkstätten. He also designed furniture for Deutsche Werkstätten Hellerau as well as designing ship interiors for the Norddeutscher Lloyd, Pianos for Ibach, and streetcar interiors for the city of Berlin. Paul's most historically significant furniture design was the Typenmöbel of 1908, the first example of modern, unit furniture conceived to allow an unlimited number of combinations of standardised, machine-made elements. Like much of his work, the Typenmöbel was widely published in contemporary professional journals.

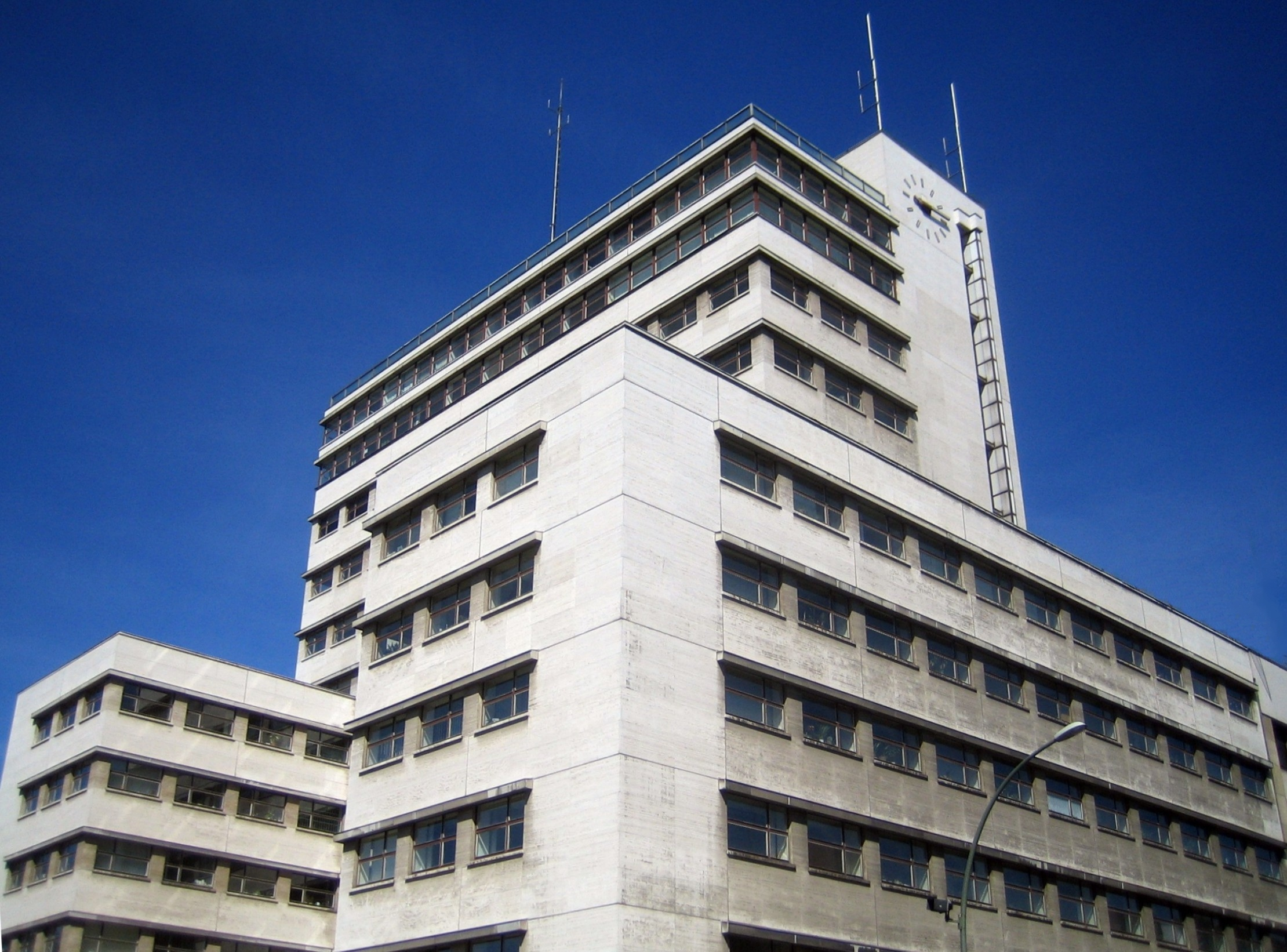
The so-called "Kathreiner-Hochhaus" in Berlin, 1928–30

After 1918, Paul's architecture reflected the changing economic and social conditions of the Weimar Republic. In 1924, he designed the Plattenhaus Typ 1018 for the Deutsche Werkstätten, a prefabricated concrete dwelling developed in response to the pressing need for affordable housing. Although the stark, prismatic volumes of the Plattenhaus reflected the vocabulary of the neue Sachlichkeit, its elegant detailing was typical of Paul's pre-war designs.

== United State School for Fine and Applied Art ==
Paul implemented the full scope of his program of reforms in 1924, when the Unterrichtsanstalt was merged with the art school of the Prussian Academy. The new institution, the Vereinigte Staatsschulen für freie und angewandete Kunst (United State School for Fine and Applied Art), provided a coherent educational program that encompassed every technical and creative aspect of artistic endeavour. As its first director, Paul led an institution regarded by Nikolaus Pevsner as one of the two most important in Germany. In the scope of its curriculum and its number of students, Paul's school in Berlin far surpassed the other, the Bauhaus. Paul's students, either in his private architectural practice or in his academic atelier, included Ludwig Mies van der Rohe, Adolf Meyer, Paul Thiersh, Kem Weber, and Sergius Ruegenberg.

Paul's career was effectively terminated in 1933, when the Nazi accession resulted in his forced resignation from the Vereinigte Staatsschulen, and loss of architectural commissions. He was forced from the Prussian Academy of Arts in 1937 He applied for Nazi party membership in late 1940, and was inducted on 1 January 1941. As of autumn 1944, the National Socialist party identified Paul as irreplaceable to German culture by including him on the Gottbegnadeten list, exempting him from military service.

After the war, Paul relocated to various cities in Germany before returning to Berlin in 1955. He died there in 1968 at the age of 94. Paul is buried in the Waldfriedhof Zehlendorf cemetery in Berlin, in a designated Ehrengrab maintained by the government.

== Architecture ==
Paul's architectural work, some of which is also attributable to students and apprentices, includes:

- first-class lounge interior, Nürnberg Hauptbahnhof, Nuremberg, 1904-1905
- interior work, four ocean liners for Norddeutscher Lloyd (SS Kronprinzessin Cecilie, SS Prinz Friedrich Wilhelm, SS Derfflinger and SS George Washington), 1906-1908
- Börnicke Castle, Bernau bei Berlin, for client Paul von Mendelssohn-Bartholdy, 1909-1911
- landmark cafe Norderney Milk Bar, Norderney, East Frisian Islands, 1910
- Zollernhof office building, Unter den Linden, Berlin-Mitte, 1909-1910
- expansion of Pützchen Sanatorium, Beuel, near Bonn, 1911 (modified)
- Haus Leffmann in Cologne
- model house and two restaurants, Werkbund Exhibition, Cologne, 1914
- Asian Museum, now part of the Ethnological Museum of Berlin, Dahlem, 1914-1921
- Rathaus, Seifhennersdorf, 1923
- Sinn & Co. GmbH department store, Bahnhofstrasse 41-43, Gelsenkirchen, 1927-1928
- corner office building, Disch House, Innenstadt, Cologne, with architect Franz Weber, 1928-1930
- Villa Traub, Prague-Střešovice, 1929-1930
- Kathreiner-Haus high-rise, Potsdamer-Strasse 186, Berlin, 1930
- Paul Lindemann villa, Charlottenburg, Berlin, now the Touro College Berlin, 1929-1931
