= Richard-Riemerschmid-Berufskolleg =

Secondary school in Cologne, Germany

Coordinates: 50.927597°N 6.952438°E

The Richard-Riemerschmid-Berufskolleg is a secondary school in the southern half of the German city of Cologne. It is notable for being named after the architect and designer Richard Riemerschmid.
