= Moritz von Beckerath =

German painter (1838–1896)

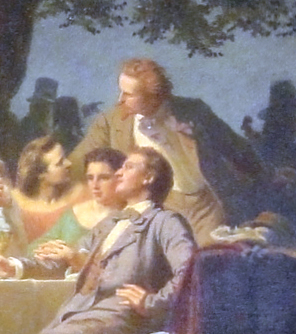
Moritz von Beckerath and his sister Hedwig in the painting Summer Night on the Rhine by Christian Eduard Böttcher

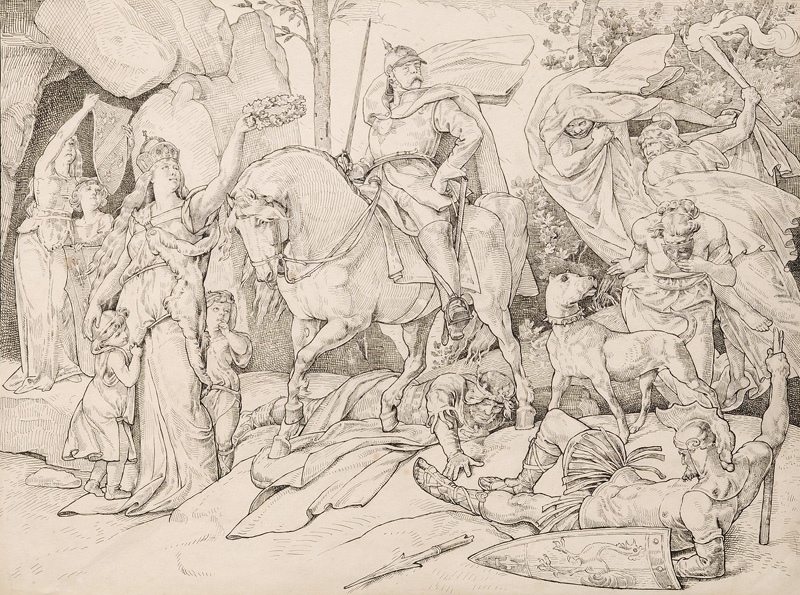
Moritz von Beckerath: Apotheose Bismarcks

Moritz von Beckerath (2 May 1838 in Krefeld – 17 September 1896 in Munich) was a German painter from the Düsseldorf school of painting.

== Works ==
=== Paintings ===
- Wittekind calls the Saxons to fight (1873), Krefeld, Kaiser Wilhelm Museum
- Alarich's burial in the Busento (around 1870), Munich, Schack-Galerie
- Sleeping reveler (art trade)

=== Illustrations ===
- In: Gustav Wendt : Ballad wreath: collected from German poets. Grote, Berlin 1866 ( urn : nbn: de: hbz: 061: 2-1665 Digitized edition of the University and State Library Düsseldorf ).
- In: Düsseldorf picture portfolio: original drawings. Grote, Berlin 1866 ( urn : nbn: de: hbz: 061: 2-1138 Digitized edition of the University and State Library Düsseldorf).
- Oh, if only it gave me the creeps and King Thrushbeard. In: German picture sheets for young and old. Gustav Weise, Stuttgart, around 1873.
- From one who set out to learn to fear. In: Münchener Bilderbogen. Braun & Schneider, Munich (year unknown).

== Literature ==
- Julius Meyer, Hermann Lücke, Hugo von Tschudi (Hrsg.): General artist lexicon. Volume 3, Leipzig 1885, p. 272.
- Friedrich von Boetticher: painter works of the 19th century. Contribution to art history. I-1, Dresden 1891, I-2, 1895.
- Hyacinth Holland: Beckerath, Moriz von. In: Allgemeine Deutsche Biographie (ADB). Volume 46, Duncker & Humblot, Leipzig 1902, p. 327 f.
- Hermann Board : Beckerath, Moritz von. In: Ulrich Thieme, Felix Becker (Hrsg.): General Lexicon of Fine Artists from Antiquity to the Present. Founded by Ulrich Thieme and Felix Becker. Tape 3: Bassano-Bickham. Wilhelm Engelmann, Leipzig 1909, p. 152 (Textarchiv - Internet Archive).
- Hans Wolfgang Singer (Ed.): General artist lexicon. Life and works of the most famous visual artists. prepared by Hermann Alexander Müller. Literary Institute Rütten & Loening, Frankfurt am Main, Volume 1, Volume 5 (supplements) 1921.
- Emmanuel Bénézit (ed.): Dictionnaire critique et documentaire des peintres, sculpteurs, dessinateurs et graveurs de tous les temps et de tous les pays. Volume 1, 1976.
- Bruckmann's Lexicon of Munich Art. Munich painter in the 19th century. Volume 1, 1981.
- Beckerath, Moritz von. In: General Artist Lexicon. The visual artists of all times and peoples (AKL). Volume 8, Saur, Munich and others. 1993, ISBN 3-598-22748-5.
- Wolfgang Hütt: The Düsseldorf School of Painting. 1819–1869. VEB EA Seemann Buch- und Kunstverlag, Leipzig 1984, pp. 240, 276.
- Barbara Lülf, In: Hans Paffrath (Ed.): Lexicon of the Düsseldorf School of Painting 1819–1918. Volume 1: Abbema – Gurlitt. Published by the Kunstmuseum Düsseldorf in the Ehrenhof and by the Galerie Paffrath. Bruckmann, Munich 1997, ISBN 3-7654-3009-9, p. 103 (fig.).
