= Rudolf von Beckerath =

German organ builder (1907–1976)

- Born: 19 February 1907; Munich, Germany
- Died: 22 November 1976 (aged 69)
- Occupation: Master organ builder
- Notable work: Organs in: Trinity Lutheran Church; St Michael's Episcopal Church; Saint Joseph's Oratory, Montreal; Dwight Chapel, Yale University; St. Andreas, Hildesheim; St. Turibius Chapel, Pontifical College Josephinum; St Paul Cathedral; The Great Hall of The University of Sydney, Australia

Rudolf von Beckerath (19 February 1907 – 22 November 1976) was a German master organ builder. He was born in Munich, to the painter Willy von Beckerath, but grew up in Hamburg, where his family moved the year he was born. He initially pursued an interest in mechanical engineering. After encountering the quality of northern German pipe organs, particularly that of master builder Arp Schnitger, von Beckerath's interest shifted. He trained as a cabinet maker at the art school in Hamburg, while studying the fundamentals of organ building on his own. In the cellar of his parents' home, he built a small house-organ, which was heard in a radio broadcast from the house and in concerts there.

His training continued in France, where he moved on the recommendation of Hans Henny Jahnn. In Châtillon-sous-Bagneux, near Paris, he entered the workshop of Victor Gonzalez. By the 1950s and 1960s, von Beckerath's own firm became one of the leaders of the Organ Reform Movement in North America and Northern Europe.

A new, four manual organ was built by von Beckerath for St. Andreas, Hildesheim, to replace one destroyed by World War Two bombing, and completed in 1966.

North American churches with noteworthy Beckerath organs include Trinity Lutheran Church in Cleveland, Ohio; Holy Cross Lutheran Church (Wichita, Kansas); St Michael's Episcopal Church in Manhattan, NYC; Saint Joseph's Oratory in Montreal, Quebec; First Congregational Church (Columbus, Ohio), Dwight Chapel, Yale University, New Haven, Connecticut; St. Turibius Chapel, Pontifical College Josephinum, Columbus, Ohio; and St. Paul Cathedral, Pittsburgh, Pennsylvania. St. Luke’s Cathedral, Sault Ste. Marie, Ontario, Canada.

In Australia, an organ manufactured by von Beckerath in 1972 replaced a Forster and Andrews pipe organ in The Great Hall of The University of Sydney that was installed between 1881 and 1882.

One of the last organs manufactured by von Beckerath is located in the Baxter Theatre Centre of the University of Cape Town in South Africa, which was installed after his death.
