= Deutsche Werkstätten Hellerau =

German company for interior fittings

- Industry: Furniture manufacturing
- Founded: October 1, 1898; 128 years ago
- Founder: Karl Schmidt-Hellerau
- Headquarters: Hellerau, Dresden, Germany
- Number of employees: 200

The Deutsche Werkstätten Hellerau is a medium-sized furniture-manufacturing business in the Hellerau district of the German city of Dresden. The company archives are deemed a valuable cultural asset and were provided with legal protection.

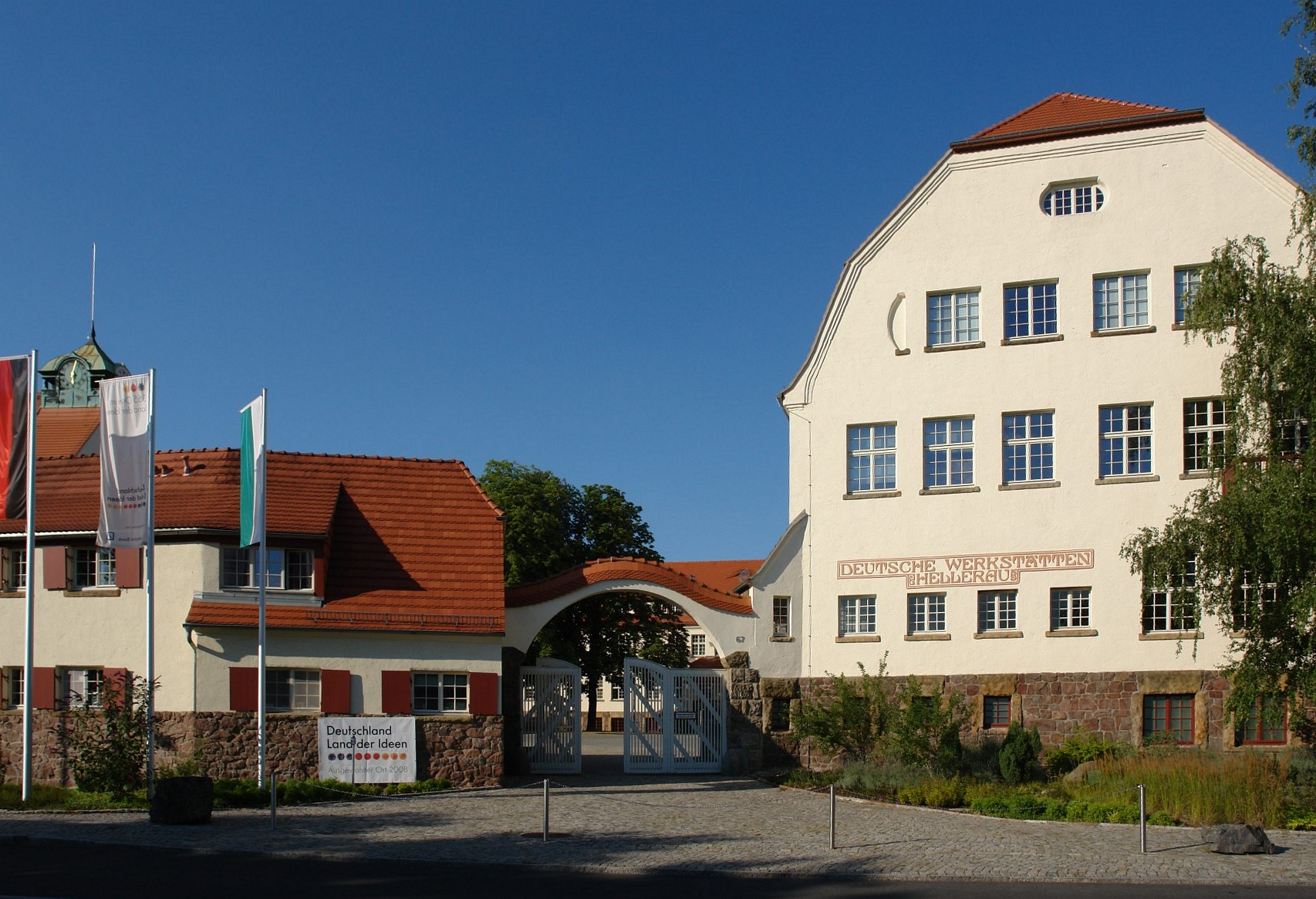
Original Hellerau workshops

== Company history ==
The workshops were founded October 1, 1898 by Karl Schmidt-Hellerau (1873-1948) under the name Dresdner Werkstätten für Handwerkskunst Schmidt und Engelbrecht, or Schmidt and Engelbrecht Dresdner workshops for craftsmanship. His partner In 1898-1899 Karl Schmidt-Hellerau and Johann Vincenz Cissarz developed a closet using plywood panels. They continued developing the technique of using plywood. In 1941, they received a patent for thermally tempered wood.

In 1907, Karl Schmidt-Hellerau established an industrial technical school and training workshops. Its first head was Joseph August Lux.

The cornerstone of a new factory was laid in 1909 in what is today Dresden-Hellerau at the same time as work began on the garden city of Hellerau. Following the commissioning of the new production hall, the company moved there in 1910. At the time, the firm occupied 450 employees.

Despite the severe global economic crisis in 1929, the years of National Socialism and the devastation of the Second World War and the socialist planned economy in the GDR, the company has endured. In 1967 the workshops began mass production of the Möbelprogramm Deutsche Werkstätten (MDW), a modular system developed by Rudolf Horn which remained in production for 24 years. Starting in 1970 Hellerau was the main plant of the Volkseigener Betrieb Möbelkombinat Hellerau, an industrial grouping of furniture producers of East Germany.

Following reunification in 1991, the company was transformed into a GmbH in 1992 and privatized by the Treuhand. It then employed 80 people, with a focus on fulfilling public sector procurement.

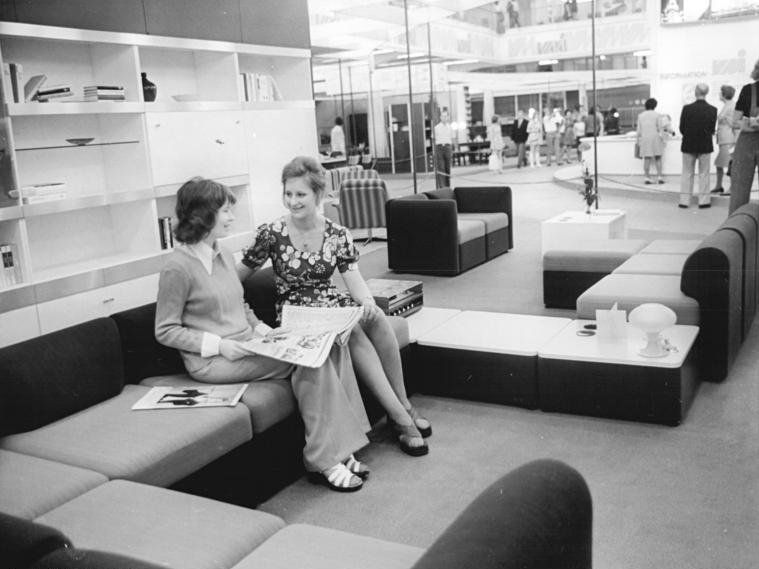
DWH wall units displayed at the Leipzig Trade Fair, 1974

At the beginning of the 21st century, Deutsche Werkstätten Hellerau employed over 200 people worldwide, with foreign subsidiaries and sales representatives in England and France.

== Social Commitment ==
During his years in England, Karl Schmidt-Hellerau became familiar with the idea of the garden city. In reaction to the conditions of worker's housing in Dresden, he decided together with other people, among them Friedrich Naumann, to build Germany's first garden city. This was accomplished in 1909.

== Awards ==
- Three bronze medals at the Paris World Fair in 1900
- Awards at the Universal Exhibitions of 1904 in St. Louis and 1937 in Paris.
