= Hellerau =

- Quarter of Dresden
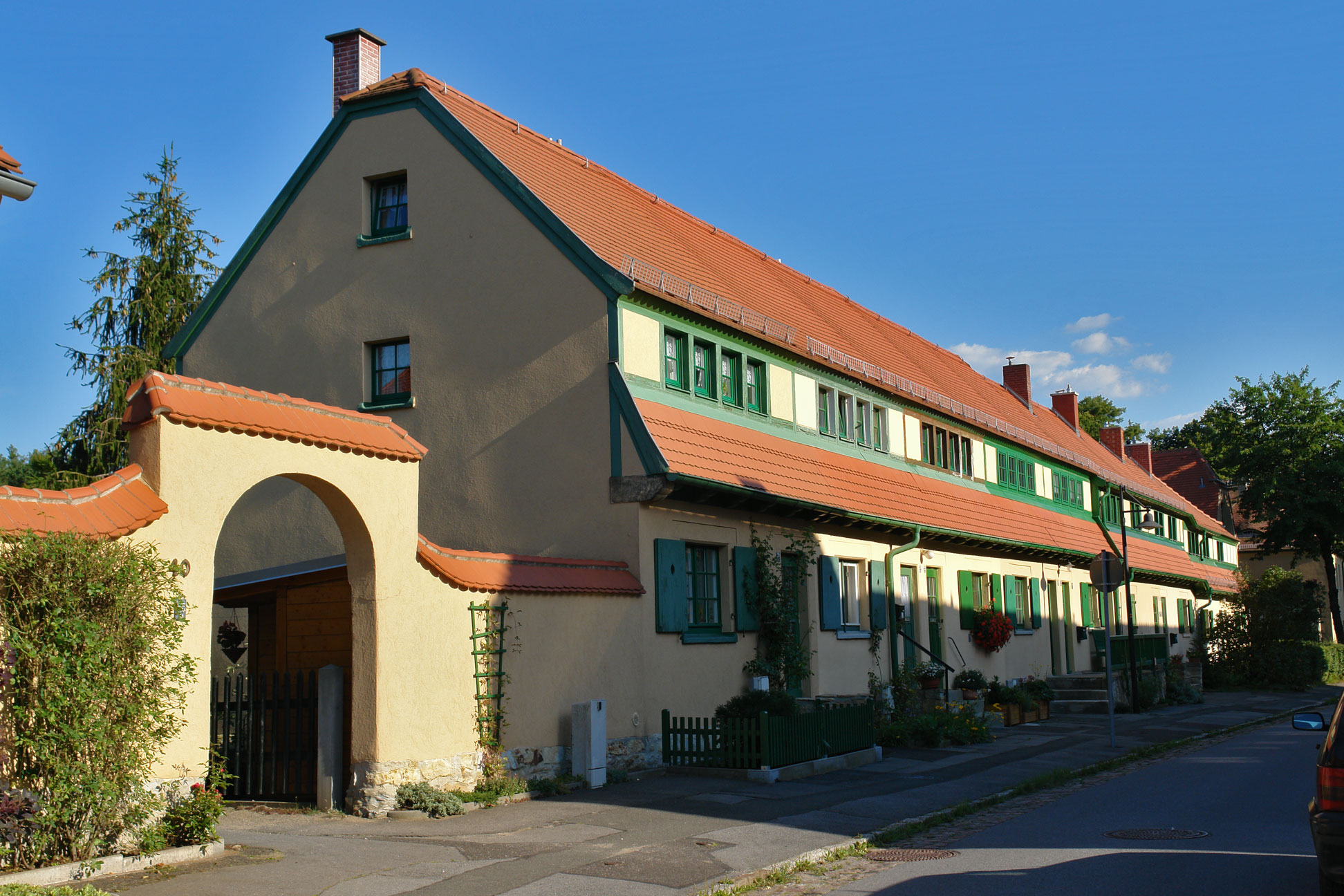

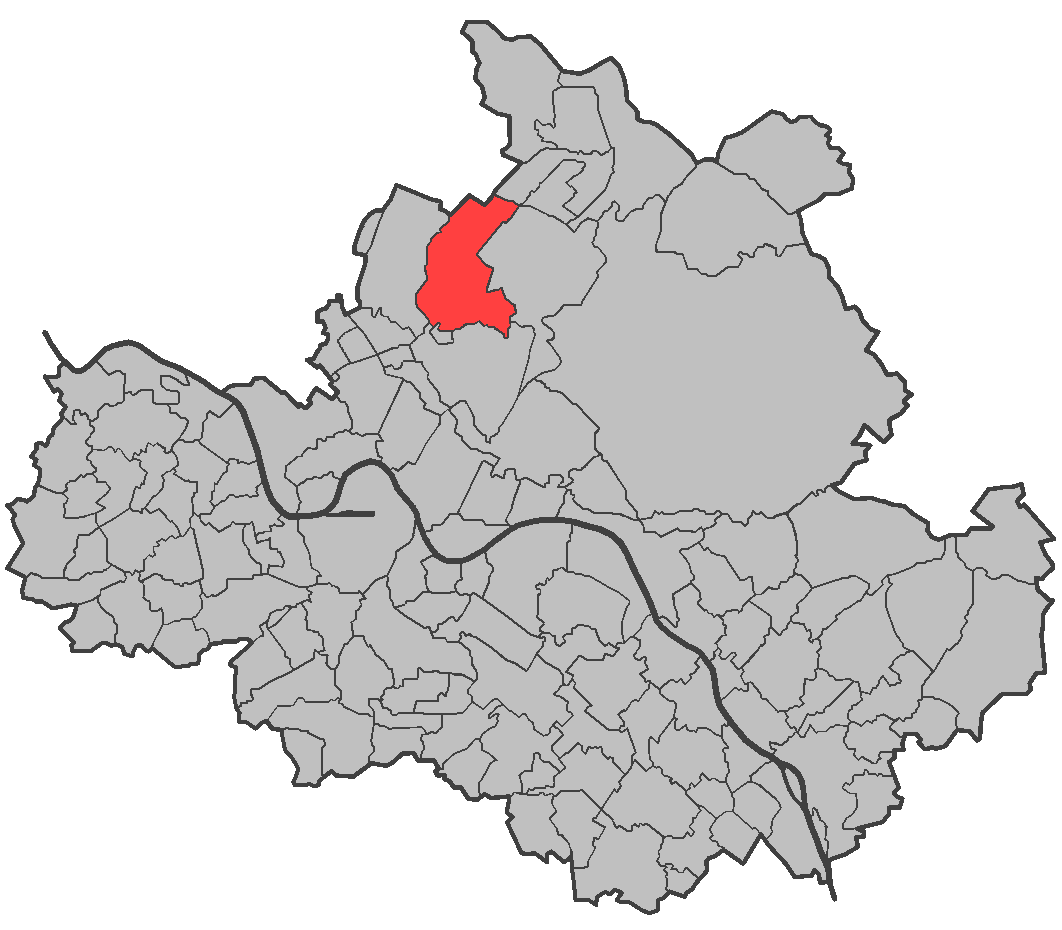
- Location of the quarter of Hellerau in Dresden
- Interactive map of Hellerau
- Location within Germany Location within Saxony
- Coordinates: 51°6′50″N 13°45′11″E
- Country: Germany
- State: Saxony
- District: Urban district
- City: Dresden
- Borough: Klotzsche

Area
  - Total: 10.69 km^{2} (4.13 sq mi)

Population (2020-12-31)
  - Total: 6,335
  - Density: 592.6/km^{2} (1,535/sq mi)
- Time zone: UTC+01:00 (CET)
  - Summer (DST): UTC+02:00 (CEST)
- Vehicle registration: DD

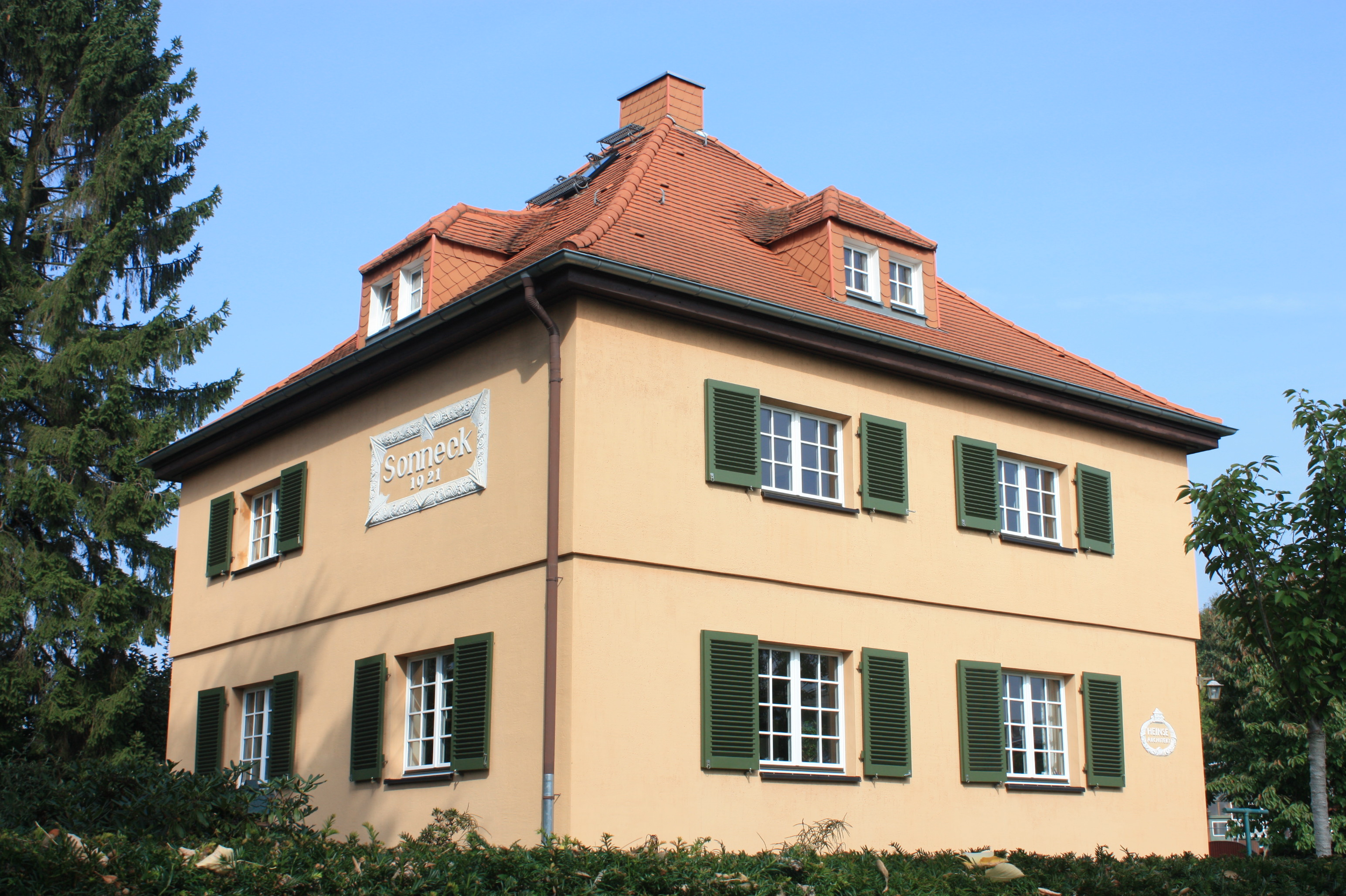
Villa Sonneck, Hellerau, 1921

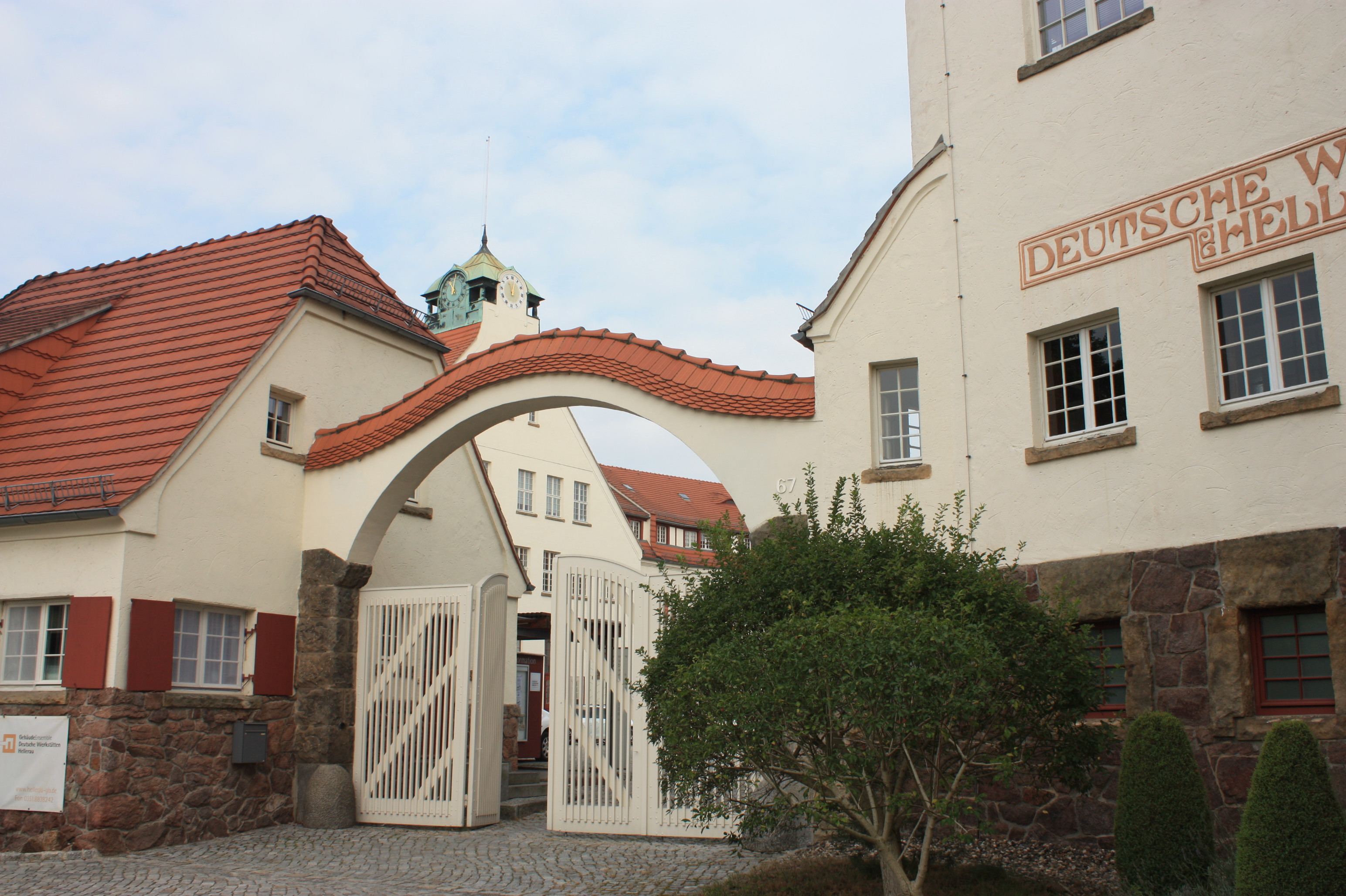
Deutsche Werkstatten, Hellerau

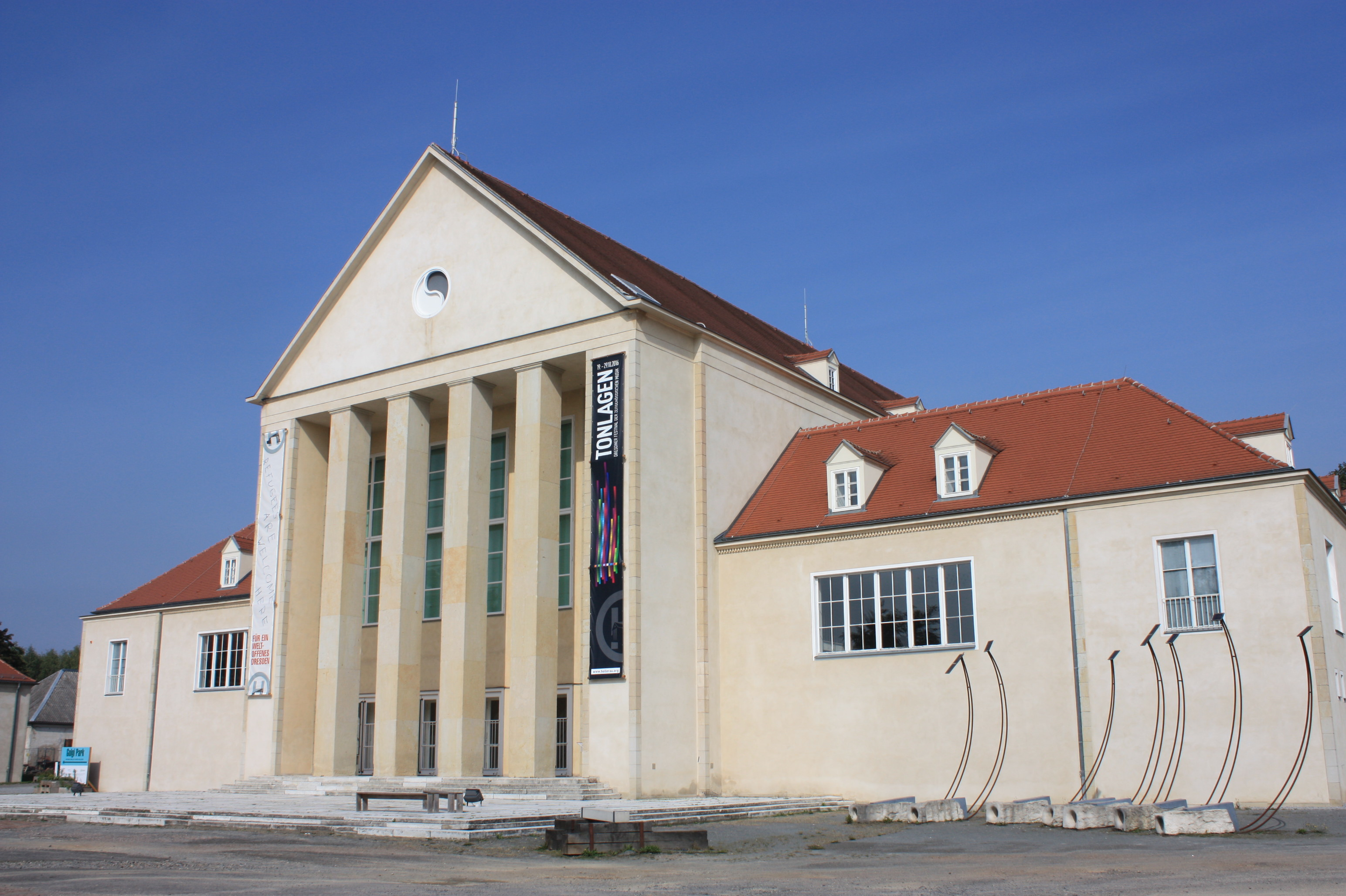
Festspielhaus, Hellerau

Hellerau is a northern quarter (Stadtteil) in the city of Dresden, Germany, slightly south of Dresden Airport. It was the first garden city in Germany. The northern section of Hellerau absorbed the village of Klotzsche, where some 18th-century buildings remain.

== Origins ==
Based on the ideas of Ebenezer Howard, businessman Karl Schmidt-Hellerau founded Hellerau near Dresden in 1909. The idea was to create an organic, planned community. Several well-known architects participated in its construction, including Richard Riemerschmid, Heinrich Tessenow, Hermann Muthesius, Kurt Frick, Georg Metzendorf, Wilhelm Kreis and Bruno Paul.

Whilst the concept of Hellerau builds on the first garden city, at Letchworth in the UK, it in turn went on to influence other similar developments elsewhere. Specifically, the Catalan architect Rafael Masó i Valentí visited Hellerau in 1912, and went on to build the garden community at S'Agaró on the Costa Brava in Spain.

Hellerau attracted cultural visionaries from all over Europe. Among them were Émile Jaques-Dalcroze, composer, and Mary Wigman, choreographer. Until the start of World War I annual festivals attracted further members of the progressive elite of the time. In 1921, the educator A. S. Neill founded the school which would later, after its relocation to Lyme Regis, become Summerhill. With the establishment of the National Socialist (Nazi) government in Germany in 1933, the progressive community at Hellerau ended.

== Pattern ==
The development lies on gently sloping ground and is laid out as a series of curvilinear streets, of an overall organic type form. Materials are typically cream rendered walls on a stone base, with red tile roofs and green windows (mainly with shutters). The landscape is dominated by tall conifers.

The Deutsche Werkstatten, a large factory involved in the production of craft furniture, played a central role in the function of the community, but geographically lies on its southern edge. Functionally this has been superseded by a modern facility further to the south.

The layout physically centres upon a small rectangular market square.

Buildings are generally from one storey and attic to three storey, but all adopt a gentle cottage style. The exception to this is the large former water tower, now converted to housing use.

== Festspielhaus ==
To the north-west the Festspielhaus provides a cultural focus. This housed a Rhythmic Gymnastics centre during the Second World War. The central building here still holds some remnants of its communist past, when it served as a Russian barracks from 1945 until 1989. The building has been restored and is now a base for a dance company.

Surrounding buildings are partly restored, with sections also hoped to create a base for resident artists. The community park surrounding the complex, Golgi Park, creates a multi-functional space serving the local community.

== Notable residents ==
- Karl Schmidt-Hellerau (1873–1948) founder of the community
- Emile Jaques-Dalcroze (1865–1950) music teacher and composer
- Richard Riemerschmid (1868–1957) architect
