= Karl Schmidt-Hellerau =

German furniture maker

Karl Camillo Schmidt-Hellerau (1 February 1873 – 6 November 1948) was a German carpenter, furniture manufacturer and social reformer. He was born in Zschopau, and is notable as the founder of Hellerau, Germany's first garden city, where he died.
