= Deutscher Werkbund =

German association of craftsmen

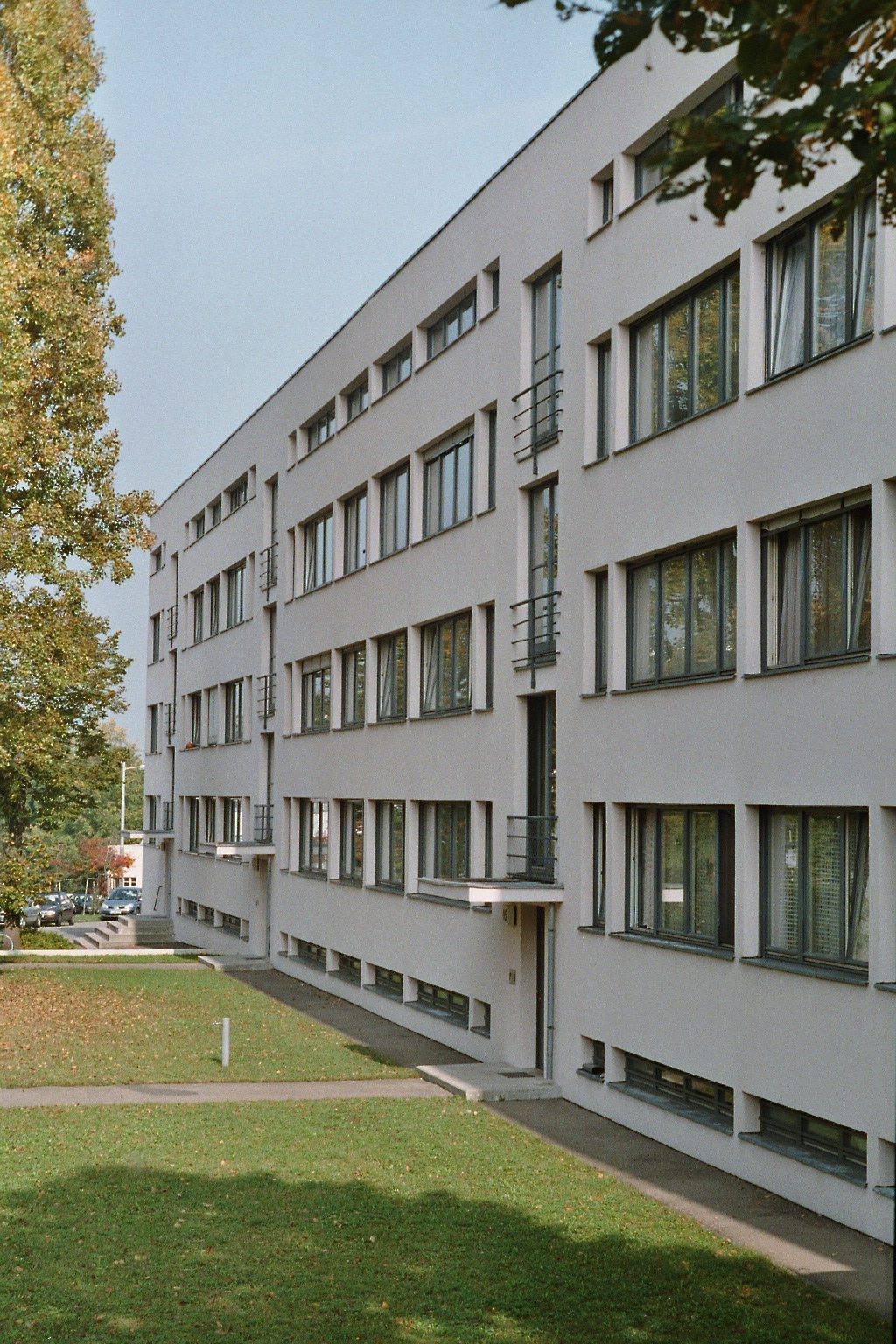
Building by Mies van der Rohe in the Weissenhof Estate (1927)

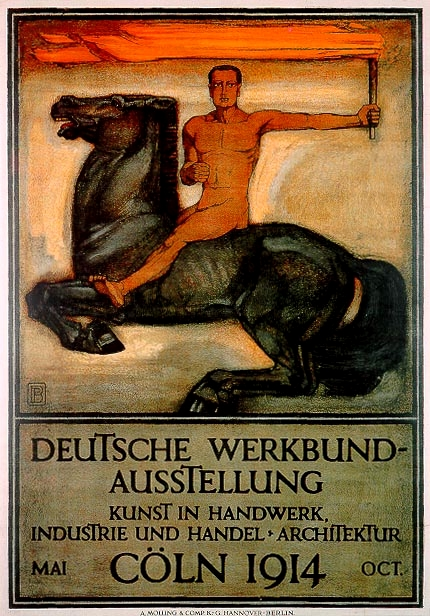
1914 exhibition poster by Peter Behrens

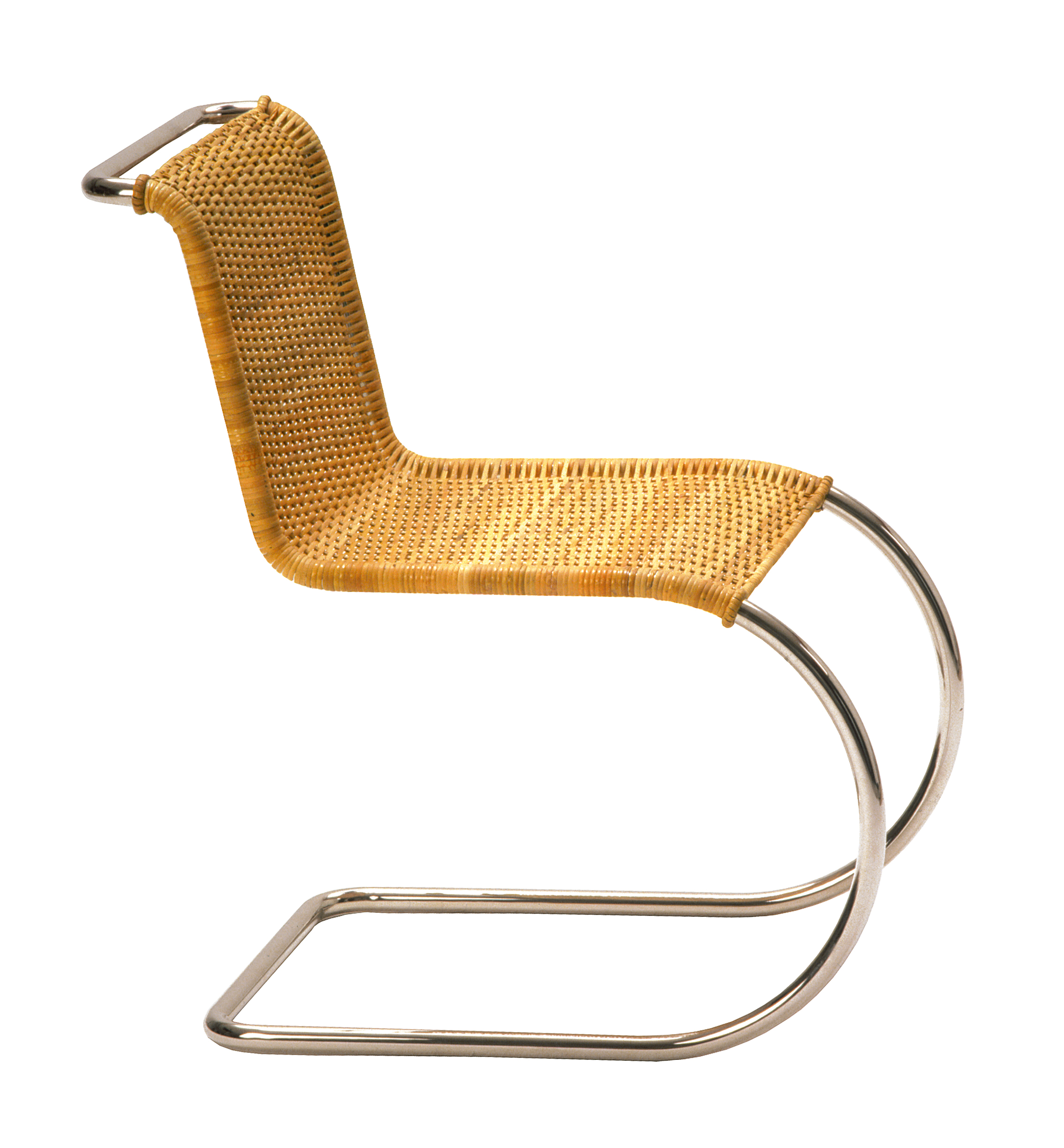
"Weißenhof chair", by Mies van der Rohe with canework upholstery by Lilly Reich (c. 1927)

The Deutscher Werkbund (German: [ˈdɔʏtʃɐ ˈvɛʁkbʊnt]; lit. 'German Association of Craftsmen') is a German association of artists, architects, designers and industrialists established in 1907. The Werkbund became an important element in the development of modern architecture and industrial design, particularly in the later creation of the Bauhaus school of design. Its initial purpose was to establish a partnership of product manufacturers with design professionals to improve the competitiveness of German companies in global markets. The Werkbund was less an artistic movement than a state-sponsored effort to integrate traditional crafts and industrial mass production techniques, to put Germany on a competitive footing with England and the United States. Its motto Vom Sofakissen zum Städtebau (from sofa cushions to city-building) indicates its range of interest.

== History ==
The Deutscher Werkbund emerged when the architect Joseph Maria Olbrich left Vienna for Darmstadt, Germany, in 1899, to form an artists' colony at the invitation of Ernest Louis, Grand Duke of Hesse. The Werkbund was founded by Olbrich, Peter Behrens, Richard Riemerschmid, Bruno Paul and others in 1907 in Munich at the instigation of Hermann Muthesius, existed through 1934, then re-established after World War II in 1950. Muthesius was the author of the exhaustive three-volume "The English House" of 1905, a survey of the practical lessons of the English Arts and Crafts movement. Muthesius was seen as something of a cultural ambassador, or industrial spy, between Germany and England.

The organization originally included twelve architects and twelve business firms. The architects include Peter Behrens, Theodor Fischer (who served as its first president), Josef Hoffmann, Bruno Paul, Max Laeuger and Richard Riemerschmid. Other architects affiliated with the project include Heinrich Tessenow and the Belgian Henry van de Velde. By 1914, it had 1,870 members, including heads of museums. The Werkbund commissioned van de Velde to design a theater for the 1914 Werkbund Exhibition in Cologne. The exhibition was closed and the buildings dismantled ahead of schedule because of the outbreak of World War I. Eliel Saarinen was made corresponding member of the Deutscher Werkbund in 1914 and was invited to participate in the 1914 Cologne exhibition. Among the Werkbund's more noted members was the architect Mies van der Rohe, who served as Architectural Director.

=== Key dates of the Deutscher Werkbund ===
- 1907, Establishment of the Werkbund in Munich
- 1910, Salon d'Automne, Paris
- 1914, Werkbund Exhibition, Cologne
- 1920, Lilly Reich becomes the first female Director
- 1924, Berlin exhibition
- 1927, Stuttgart exhibition (including the Weissenhof Estate)
- 1929, Breslau exhibition
- 1934, Werkbund declare dissolution
- 1947, Reestablishment

=== 100th anniversary ===
The Verband Deutscher Industrie Designer (Association of German Industrial Designers, or VDID) and the Bund Deutscher Grafik-Designer (Federation of German Graphic Designers, or "BDG-Mitte") held a joint meeting to celebrate the 100th anniversary of the Deutscher Werkbund. A juried exhibition and opening was held on 14 March 2008.

== Museum der Dinge ==
The collections and archives (Werkbundarchiv) of the Werkbund are housed at the Museum der Dinge (Museum of Things) in Berlin. The museum is focused on design and objects used in everyday life in the 20th century up to the present. Among other exhibits, it includes a Frankfurt kitchen.

== Members ==
- Konrad Adenauer
- Friedrich Adler
- Adolf Arndt
- Anker-Werke Delmenhorst
- Ferdinand Avenarius
- Otto Bartning
- Willi Baumeister
- Adolf Behne
- Hendrik Petrus Berlage
- Richard Berndl
- Johann Michael Bossard
- Raymund Brachmann
- Fritz August Breuhaus de Groot
- Bazon Brock
- Ulrich Böhme
- Max Burchartz
- Charles Crodel
- Carl Otto Czeschka
- Wilhelm von Debschitz
- Franz Karl Delavilla
- Peter A. Demeter
- Walter Dexel
- Eugen Diederichs
- Bruno Dörpinghaus
- Karl Duschek
- Adolph Eckhardt
- Egon Eiermann
- Albert Eitel
- August Endell
- Jupp Ernst
- Lyonel Feininger
- Wend Fischer
- Karl Ganser
- Hansjörg Göritz
- Hermann Gretsch
- Walter Gropius
- Moritz Hadda
- Richard Hamann
- Luise Harkort
- Hugo Häring
- Hans Heckner
- Max Heidrich
- Erwin Heerich
- Hans Hertlein
- Max Hertwig
- Lucy Hillebrand
- Georg Hirth
- Theodor Heuss
- Ot Hoffmann
- Helmut Hofmann
- Ferdy Horrmeyer
- Paul Horst-Schulze
- Klaus Humpert
- Walter Maria Kersting
- Harald Kimpel
- Clemens Klotz
- Moissey Kogan
- Hans P. Koellmann
- Ludwig König
- Ernst Kühn
- Hugo Kükelhaus
- Klaus Küster
- Ferdinand Kramer
- Günter Kupetz
- Emil Lange
- Carl Langhein
- Josef Lehmbrock
- El Lissitzky
- Johannes Ludovicus Mathieu Lauweriks
- Richard Luksch
- Gerhard Marcks
- Ewald Mataré
- Ernst May
- Kunstmuseen Krefeld
- Erich Mendelsohn
- Wolfgang Meisenheimer
- Georg Metzendorf
- Mies van der Rohe
- Leberecht Migge
- Anna Muthesius
- Hermann Muthesius
- Friedrich Naumann
- Walter Neuhäusser
- Hans Neumann
- Else Oppler-Legband
- Karl Ernst Osthaus
- Ludwig Paffendorf
- Bernhard Pankok
- Karl Poser
- Walfried Pohl
- Jan Thorn Prikker
- Peter Raacke
- Adolf Rading
- Jochen Rahe
- Dieter Rams
- Walther Rathenau
- Carl Rehorst
- Lilly Reich
- Albert Reimann
- Albert Renger-Patzsch
- Paul Renner
- Richard Riemerschmid
- Alexander Michailowitsch Rodtschenko
- Gregor Rosenbauer
- Walter Rossow
- Werner Ruhnau
- Hans Scharoun
- Karl Schmidt-Hellerau
- Adolf Gustav Schneck
- Willy Schönefeld
- Werner Schriefers
- Rudolf Alexander Schröder
- Reinhard Schulze
- Fritz Schupp
- Margarete Schütte-Lihotzky
- Walter Schwagenscheidt
- Rudolf Schwarz
- Hans Schwippert
- Ferdinand Selle
- Bernd Sikora
- Anna Simons
- Carl Sonntag jun.
- Friedrich Spengelin
- Bernhard Stadler
- Anton Stankowski
- Heinz Stoffregen
- Ludwig Sütterlin
- Heinrich Straumer
- Gustav Stresemann
- Bruno Taut
- Heinrich Tessenow
- Paul Thiersch
- Emil Thormählen
- Walter Tiemann
- Paul Ludwig Troost
- Otto Ubbelohde
- Henry van de Velde
- Theodor Veil
- Otto Voelckers
- Heinrich Vogeler
- Fritz Wärndorfer
- Wilhelm Wagenfeld
- Otto Wagner
- Udo Weilacher
- Werkbund Werkstatt Nürnberg
- Edward Weston
- Alfred Wiener
- Karl With
- Dieter Witte
- Georg Wrba
- Christoph Zöpel
- Berta Zuckerkandl

== See also ==
- New Objectivity (architecture)
- Modern architecture
- WUWA (Breslau)
