= Werkbund Exhibition =

The Werkbund Exhibition may refer to:

- Werkbund Exhibition (1914)
- Werkbund Exhibition – The Dwelling, 1927
