= Else Oppler-Legband =

German architect (1875 -1965)

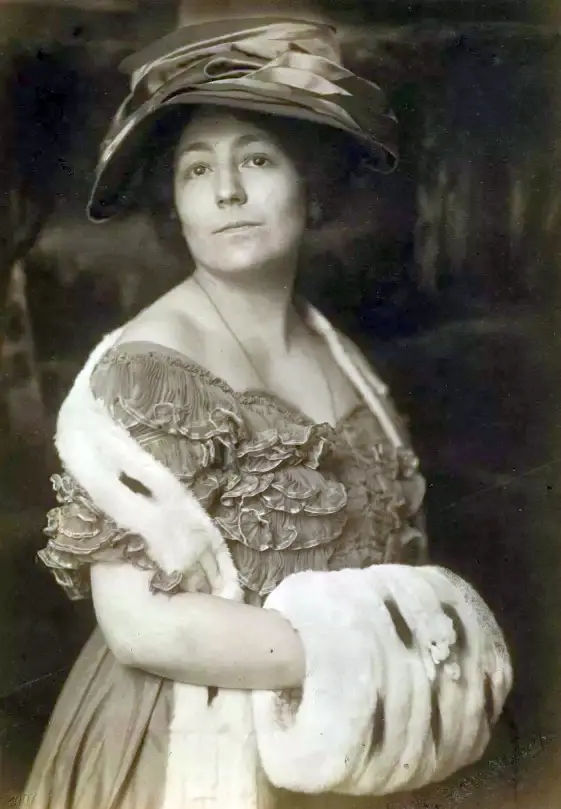
- Else Oppler-Legband, portrait photo by Minya Diez-Dührkoop, 1907
- Born: Else Oppler; 21 February 1875; Nuremberg
- Died: 7 December 1965 (aged 90); Überlingen
- Citizenship: Kingdom of Bavaria; West Germany
- Education: Academy of Fine Arts, Munich
- Occupations: Architect; Interior designer; Fashion designer
- Movement: Reformkleidung
- Spouse: Paul Legband (1904–)
- Partner: Peter Behrens (1920–)

Else Oppler-Legband (21 February 1875 in Nuremberg – 7 December 1965 in Überlingen) was a German architect and interior designer, costume designer and stylist.

She is one of the representatives of the Victorian dress reform which aimed to free women from sacramental constraints by reforming women's fashion in the 1910s and 1920s. She also worked for the cinema at the turn of the 1920s as costume designer and set designer.

== Early years ==
Else Oppler-Legband was one of the representatives of the so-called Lebensreform, 'life reform' of Fashion in the 1910s and 1920s, centered in Berlin. In innovative circles of design and architecture, aesthetic interest in naked forms, devoid of ornamentation, spread from fashion to architectural theory.

== Wedding ==
In 1904, Oppler married the artistic director, director and stage designer Paul Legband (1876–1942). Around 1913, she and her husband worked in Freiburg im Breisgau. From 1913 at the latest, she is documented as a member of the Deutscher Werkbund (DWB), 'German Association of Craftsmen'.

== Costume designer and set designer for the cinema ==
- 1919: König Nicolo
- 1920: Der Schwarm der höheren Töchter
- 1920: Schwarzwaldmädel
- 1920: Die Kronjuwelen des Herzogs von Rochester
- 1922: Marie Antoinette, das Leben einer Königin

== Last years ==
After the Nazi seizure of power in March 1933, the Jew Oppler-Legband was forced to flee. She first went to the Netherlands, then to South Tyrol in fascist Italy and finally to Sweden. After the end of World War II, she returned in 1952 to Germany and lived in Überlingen on Lake Constance until her death on 7 December 1965.

== Literature ==
- Else Oppler-Legband: Die Höhere Schule für Dekorationskunst. In: Durchgeistigung der deutschen Arbeit. Jahrbuch des Deutschen Werkbundes 1912, Jena 1912, S. 105–110.
- Gaby Franger: Else Oppler – Eine außergewöhnliche Künstlerin, 1875–1965. Nürnberg 2023, ISBN 978-3-935225-16-8
