= Hansjörg Göritz =

German architect and author (born 1959)

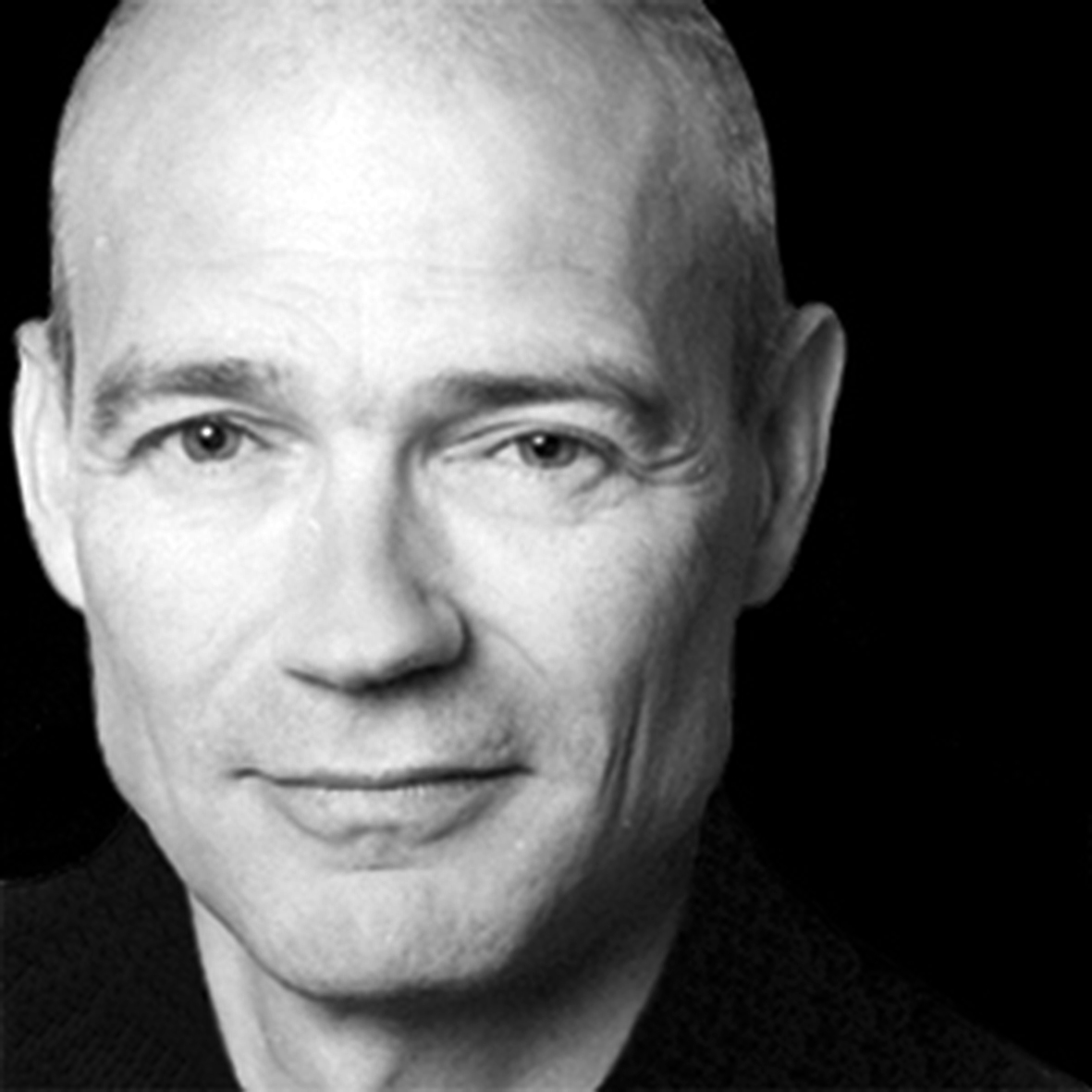
- Born: 5 June 1959 (age 67) Hannover, Lower Saxony, West Germany
- Occupation: Architect, designer, professor, author
- Subject: simplicity
- Spouse: Gisela Göritz

Website
- www.hansjoerggoeritz.com

Hansjörg Göritz (English: Hansjoerg Goeritz; born 5 June 1959) is a German-American architect, professor, author and designer associated with pure and minimalist architecture that emphasizes place, space, light and material. For his early works he was awarded one of the most prestigious architecture awards in Germany in 1996, the Development Award Baukunst to the Kunstpreis Berlin by the Academy of Arts, Berlin. In 2013 he was recognized as an Affiliated Fellow to the American Academy in Rome.

== Biography ==
Goeritz was born in Hannover, West Germany and grew up in the vernacular context of Lower Saxony as the son of a mason. After his Abitur he apprenticed to a mason with honors as Best of the Guild. At the same time he enrolled for courses at an evening school for master masons, after which he apprenticed in architecture mainly as an autodidact, in conjunction with studies at Hildesheim University of Applied Arts and Sciences, and at the London Architectural Association School of Architecture. After Grand Tours d'Orients in the Mediterranean, to Cistercian monasteries, to picturesque gardens in England, and travels in Scandinavia he practices with his Studio in Hannover since 1986, and Berlin since 2007.

He designed Liechtenstein's state forum and parliament buildings, the first in its history, for which he was awarded the international Brick Award 2010 that was previously awarded to Pritzker laureate Peter Zumthor in 2008. His Expo 2000 train station design is materialized with custom made Florentine cobalt blue glass blocks and blue pigmented concrete to match the color of the German state railway corporate design on the Expo-line, connecting the airport to the Expo fairgrounds, in Hannover, Germany. The project became an exhibit at the 6th Biennale di Architettura, Venice 1996.

He has taught architecture as a visiting professor at Hildesheim University of Applied Sciences and Arts in 1995 – 1997, as a tenured professor at Dortmund University of Applied Sciences and Arts in 1999 – 2001, and is a professor at the University of Tennessee, College of Architecture and Design in Knoxville, Tennessee, since 2007. In an international arena he lectures widely and was a visiting critic at prestigious institutions including the Accademia di Architettura Mendrisio and Yale, is a visiting adjunct faculty at Auburn University, and has taught at the 2018 UT Finland Architecture Summer Institute at Aalto University Helsinki. By appointment he is affiliated to Bund Deutscher Architekten BDA (German Association of Architects) since 1993 and Deutscher Werkbund DWB (German Association of Fine Works) since 2000, and is an International Associate with the American Institute of Architects AIA since 2007. By invitation he joined The International Journal of The Arts in Society of Common Ground Publishers, Illinois, USA as an associate editor in 2010, the Wessex Institute of Technology, UK, in 2011 as an international scientific advisory committee member, and the board of Knoxville's James White's Fort Association in 2020.

Among other notable recognitions he was a state nominee for the German Villa Massimo Rome Prize 1988, for the German international architects and architecture critics award, the Erich-Schelling-Award 1998, and was awarded the Deubau-Award for Young German Architects 1994, the BDA Award Lower Saxony 1994, and the German Brick Award 1994.

== Family ==
Göritz is married to Gisela Göritz. The couple has two children, Cornelius, a filmmaker and specialist for vintage Porsche cars, and Camilla, an actress

== Selected projects ==
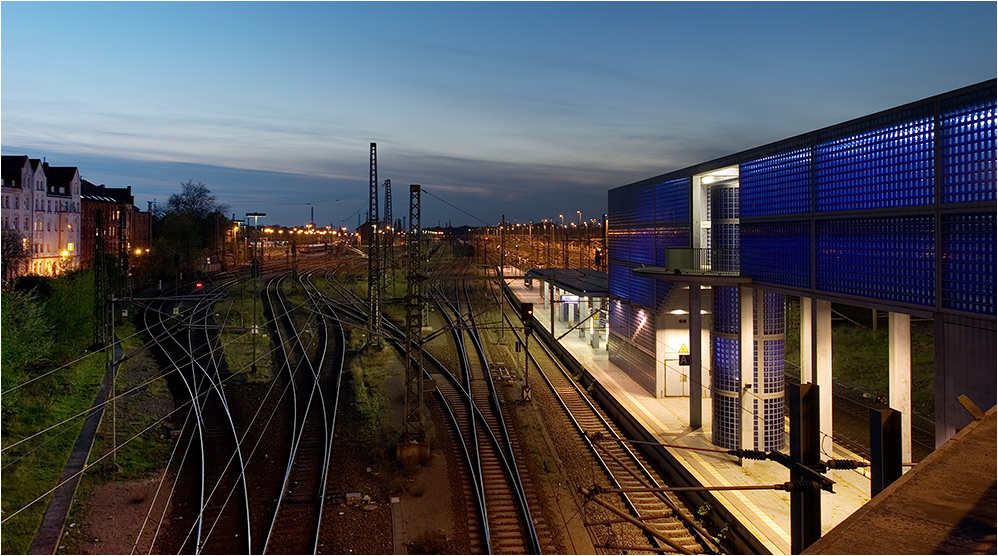
S-Bahnhof Hannover-Nordstadt

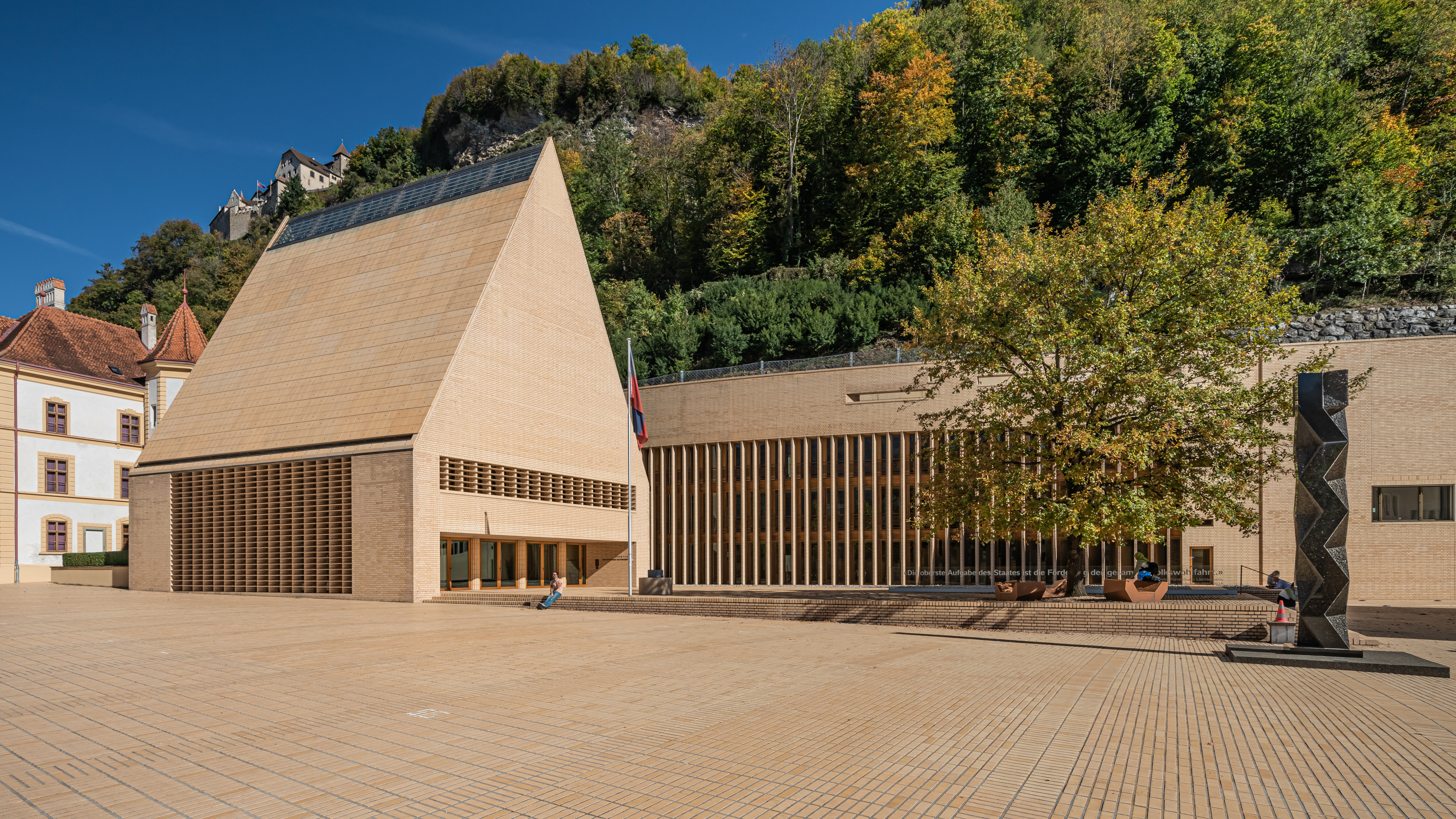
Hohes Haus Liechtenstein 07

- 2015 Museum of the 20th Century in the Cultural Forum, Berlin, Germany
- 2015 The Gardens of Bamiyan, Cultural Center, UNESCO, Bamiyan, Afghanistan
- 2013 Karosta Ghost Town Challenge Cultural Center, Liepaja, Republic of Latvia
- 2007 Neue Rheinuferpromenade Novartis Campus Basel [New Rhine Embankment Promenade Novartis Campus Basel]
- 2008 – 2009 Grand Garden (Knoxville Botanical Gardens and Arboretum), Knoxville, Tennessee, USA
- 2007 Concrete Origami, (New Rhine River Embankment Promenade), Basel, Switzerland
- 2001 – 2008 Supreme House (National Forum and Assembly), Vaduz, Principality of Liechtenstein
- 1991 – 2007 Medallion, (Baroque Timber Market Square), Wolfenbüttel, Germany
- 1997 Volumes of Glass Blocks (Metro Rail Station EXPO 2000), Hannover Nordstadt, Germany
- 1996 Long Dormitorium (Suburban Condominiums), Bemerode, Germany
- 1993 Hall within Stone Block (Suburban H Residence), Ahlem, Germany
- 1993 Stone Wall (Klimmt Head Offices + Showroom), Hildesheim, Germany
- 1992 Stone House inside Timber House (Rural K Residence), Kirchhorst, Germany
- 1990 House on Columns within a House (Suburban H Residence), Pattensen, Germany
- 1989 House with Glass Block Lantern (M Dentist Office), Hannover, Germany

== Awards and recognitions ==
- 2020 Faculty Development Award, Lewerentz Indifference, University of Tennessee
- 2019 AIA National Award for Innovation in Technology, University of Tennessee Technology Curriculum, co-laureate
- 2017 Alumni Outstanding Teacher Award, Nominee, University of Tennessee
- 2015 Faculty Development Leave, awarded sabbatical
- 2014 Faculty Development Award, Beginning Design, University of Tennessee
- 2013 American Academy in Rome Affiliated Fellowship, University of Tennessee, for Rome research proposal 'Intra Murus', including studies on Louis I. Kahn's 1953 AAR residence
- 2012 Prometheus Leadership Award, University of Tennessee, Center for Educational Leadership, for contributions to improve education through an interdisciplinary approach to leadership, learning and service
- 2010 Scholar of the Week, University of Tennessee, for merits of the International Brick Award 2010
- 2010 Brick Award 2010, International Prime Award for Liechtenstein State Forum and National Assembly
- 2009 German Architecture Museum DAM Prize for Architecture in Germany selected Liechtenstein National Assembly
- 2008 Bundesstiftung Baukultur Potsdam [German Foundation for Built Culture] selects public buildings for trust's collection
- 2007 Postage Stamp, Series 'Contemporary Architecture', First Edition 19 November 2007, New Parliament, Principality of Liechtenstein
- 2006 Hyde Chair of Excellence, shortlisted, University of Nebraska at Lincoln, USA
- 2000 Aga Khan Trust for Culture, Geneva Switzerland, selects writings and buildings for trust's collection
- 1998. Erich-Schelling-Award 1998, Trustees Nominee, International Award for Architects and Architecture Critics
- 1996 Kunstpreis Berlin 1996, Development Award Baukunst, Akademie der Künste Berlin, Germany
- 1994 National Deubau-Preis Junge Architekten 1994 for 'Hall within Stone Block', 'Stone House inside Timber House', and 'Stone Wall'
- 1994 National Brick Award 1994 for 'Hall within Stone Block', 'Stone House inside Timber House', and 'Stone Wall'
- 1994 BDA Award Lower Saxony 1994, German Association of Architects, award for H Residence
- 1994 BDA Award Lower Saxony 1994, German Association of Architects, acknowledgment for Klimmt Head Offices
- 1988 Villa Massimo, German Rome Prize, Section Architecture, State Nominee, Lower Saxony Ministry of Education and Culture

== Selected publications ==
- 2019 A+U 588, Japan Architecture and Urbanism, September 2019, Silent Master Builder, author
- 2017 A+U 564, Japan Architecture and Urbanism, September 2017, Bernt Nyberg, co-guest-editor
- 2017 A+U 564, Japan Architecture and Urbanism, September 2017, Rediscovering and Contextualizing Nyberg, author
- 2016 Three Scandinavian Sisters, Book Inclusion, S:t Petri 50 Ar, Klippan, Sweden, author
- 2016 Lewerentz’s Lessons, Book Inclusion, S:t Petri 50 Ar: Kontext, Fragmenter, och Influenser, Klippan, Sweden
- 2015 Nyberg’s Sublime Sculptures, Catalogue Essay to the exhibition Endangered Architecture, Lund, Sweden, author
- 2014 Architecture Forum Hong Kong, Commentaries on Chinese Avantgarde Architecture, author
- 2013 db 7/13, Zur Architekturkritik [On Architecture Criticism], author
- 2012 der architect 6/12 ex libris, Grundlegend – Ungers Thematisierung und Rossis Selbsbiographie, author
- 2011 the Atlantic Magazine, Feature on the Principality of Liechtenstein Parliament
- 2010 Phaidon Atlas of 21st Century World Architecture (Phaidon Press, 2010)
- 2010 brick '10 (Hansjörg Göritz Brick Award 2010, Callwey 2010) ISBN 978-3-7667-1824-2
- 2009 German Architecture Annual 2009 – 2010 (Prestel, 2009) ISBN 978-3-7913-4367-9
- 2009 Lighting India 1 (Calculated Light – On Essentials for Rebirth of Architectural Space, Hansjörg Göritz 2009)
- 2009 DBZ 2/09 (Die Leichtigkeit des Steins?, Hansjörg Göritz 2009)
- 2009010 WIT/common ground (Vast Vicinity or Dense Garden Carpets – Learning from Essential Settlings and Dwellings, Hansjörg Göritz 2009/2010)
- 2008 hochparterre 4/08 (Der zweite Leitbau Liechtensteins, Benedikt Loderer)
- 2008 Neue Zürcher Zeitung 10 March 2008 (Stadt im Werden, Roman Hollenstein)
- 2007 Alpenmagazin (Interview Hansjörg Göritz, Wie im Sandkasten, Urs Fitze)
- 2007 Dortmunder Architekturheft No 20 (Hohes Haus – der Gesetzgebung Obdach geben, Hansjörg Göritz 2007) ISBN 978-3-88364-061-7
- 2006 Baukultur 6.06 (Das Phaenomen Louis I Kahn, Hansjörg Göritz 2006)
- 2006 Baukultur 5.06 (Wohnen und Siedeln – Erkundungen des Essentiellen, Hansjörg Göritz 2006)
- 2005 Liechtensteiner Vaterland 14 September 2005 (Interview Hansjörg Göritz, Wenigen ist ein solches Privileg gegeben, Susha Maier)
- 2001 Neue Zürcher Zeitung 6 April 2001 (Das Parlament als Urhütte, Beat Aeberhard)
- 2000 Berliner Zeitung Feuilleton 7 April 2000 (Auf dem Weg zur Expo, Klaus-Dieter Weiss)
- 2000 Arche (Archen bauen – Mittler und Übergangsräume zwischen Hermetik und Hermeneutik, Hansjörg Göritz, Editor 2000)
- 1998 Baukultur 5.98 (Riss und Raum – Plädoyer für eine neue Konvention des Bauens als Raumkunst, Hansjörg Göritz 1998)
- 1998 Jahrbuch Licht und Architektur 1998 (Das Beispiel, Kalkuliertes Licht – Wiedergeburt architektonischen Raumes, Hansjörg Göritz 1998) ISBN 3-923974-74-4
- 1998 Young German Architects 1 – Hansjörg Göritz (Birkhäuser, 1998) ISBN 3-7643-5782-7
- 1997 Berliner Zeitung Feuilleton 5 November 1997 (Ein Bahnhof ohne Stadt im Bauch, Klaus-Dieter Weiss)
- 1996 AIT 1–2 96 (Ungesetzte Steine – oder: Die Praxis kultureller Donquichotterie, Hansjörg Göritz 1996)
- 1995 AIT 7–8 95 (Hommage – Heinz Bienefeld 1926 – 1995, Hansjörg Göritz 1995) ISSN 0173-8046
- 1995 Architektur in Niedersachsen 1970–1995 (Junius, 1995) ISBN 3-88506-256-9
- 1994 Centrum Jahrbuch Architektur und Stadt (Genauigkeit und Mythos – Steinhäuser von Hansjörg Göritz, Vieweg 1994) ISBN 3-528-08803-6
- 1994 Neue Zürcher Zeitung 1 July 1994 (Geist und Handwerk, Clemens Klemmer)
- 1994 Frankfurter Allgemeine Feuilleton 22 March 1994 (Lernen von Vitruvius – Erinnerung an vergessene Ursprünge: Die preisgekrönte Architektur von Hansjörg Göritz, Gert Kähler)

== See also ==
- AA School London – Notable former students
