= Carl Langhein =

German painter

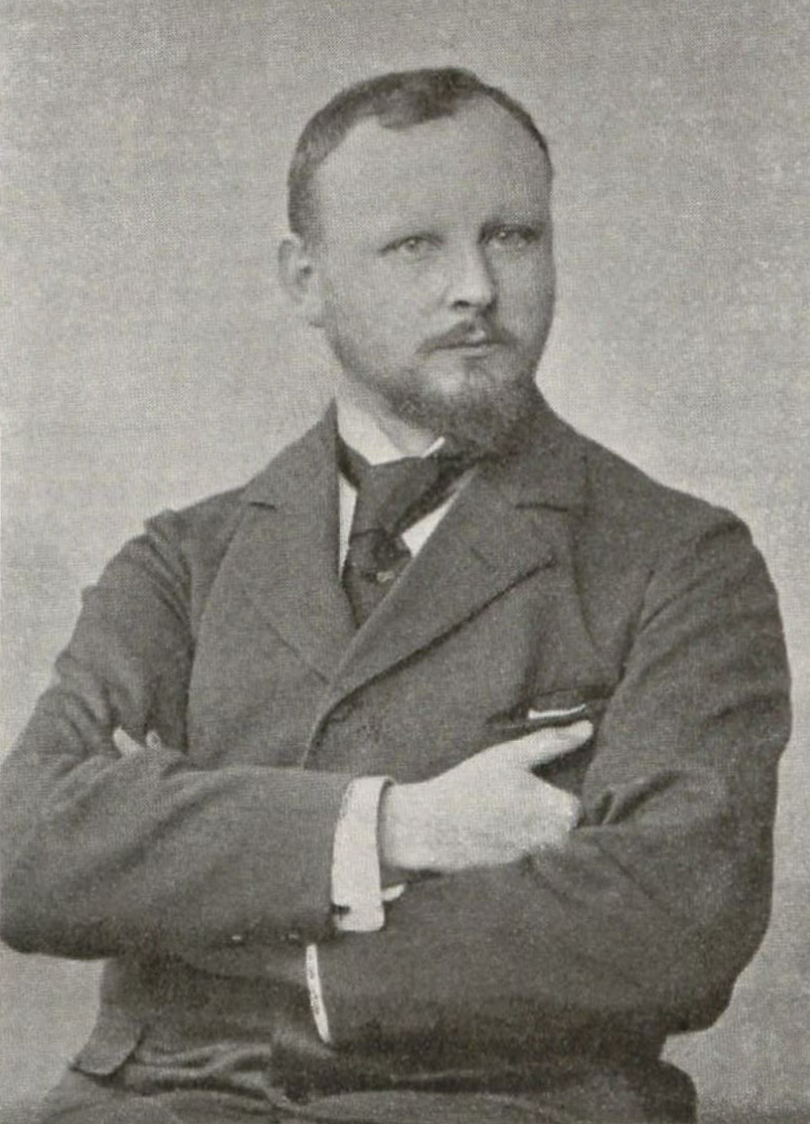
Carl Langhein (before 1905)

Carl Johannes Louis Langhein (29 February 1872, Hamburg – 26 June 1941, Hadamar) was a German painter and graphic artist.

== Life and work ==
He was born to Carl Jacob Martin Langhein (1846–1914), an upholsterer and decorator, and his wife, Louise Catharina Maria née Westphal (1849–1873). In 1880, his father remarried and emigrated to the United States. He stayed behind and began serving an apprenticeship in lithography with the printer, Gustav W. Seitz (born 1826). Later, he also took drawing courses at a trade school. After leaving Seitz, he worked at the firm of Hans Kohler & Co, in Allgäu.

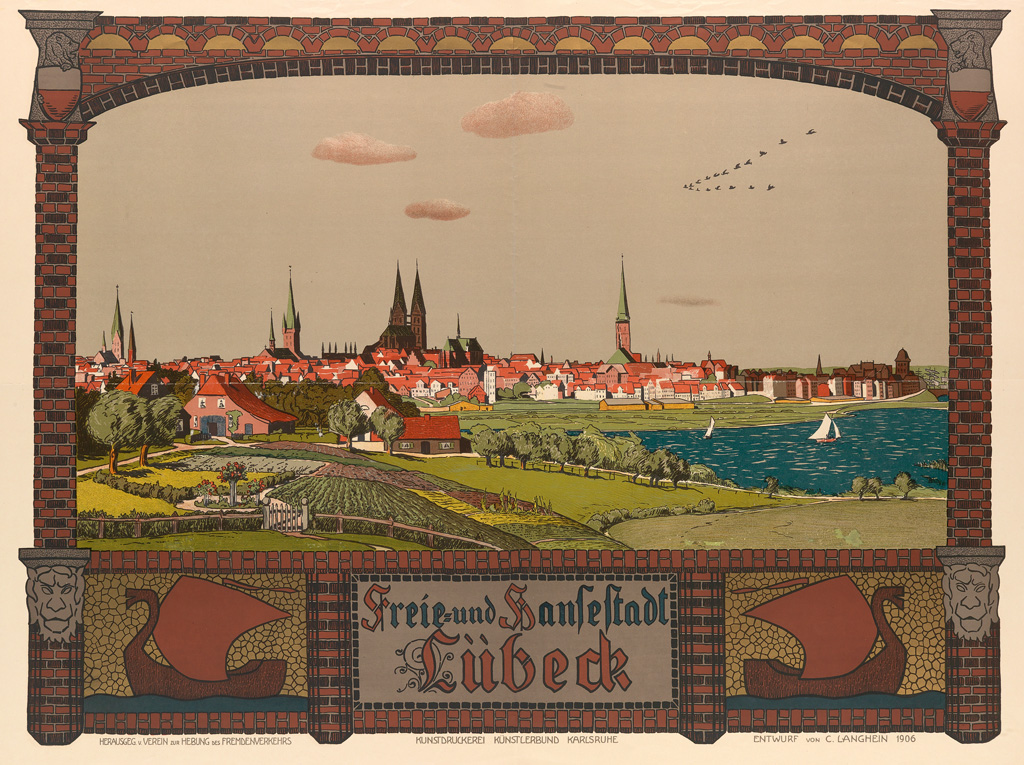
"Freie und Hansestadt Lübeck" (poster)

From 1891 to 1892, he was able to study at the Academy of Arts, Berlin, with the painter, Robert Warthmüller. He continued his studies at the Academy of Fine Arts, Karlsruhe, with Carlos Grethe and Robert Poetzelberger. In 1895, he was able to obtain a position as an assistant to Leopold von Kalckreuth. Scholarships from his hometown of Hamburg enabled him to make study trips during this time. In 1897, he became managing director of the newly created Kunstdruckerei Künstlerbund Karlsruhe (fine art printers' association), a position he would hold until 1926. He married Anna Elisabeth Schmider (1877–1956) in 1898. They would have two sons, who pursued technical careers, and a daughter, who married a banker.

As part of the celebrations related to the golden wedding anniversary of Grand Duke Friedrich I and Grand Duchess Luise, in 1906, Langhein and several others were given professorships. That same year, he was able to build a combination studio and home in Otterndorf. In 1907, he was one of the founders of the Deutscher Werkbund. Four years later, he built a second home in Otterndorf and settled there permanently.

During World War I, he served in the Imperial German Navy, with the rank of Lieutenant, and was awarded the Hanseatic Cross. Upon being discharged, he established his own publishing company, the Hanseatischer Kunstverlag GmbH, based in Hamburg.

In 1926, he was diagnosed with paralytic dementia. His condition worsened and, within a year, it became necessary to put him in the Lüneberg Psychiatric Hospital. He remained there until 1941 when, in accordance with Aktion T4, the Nazi euthanasia program, he was transferred to the Hadamar Euthanasia Centre and put to death with carbon monoxide.

Two streets have been named for him; in Karlsruhe's Grötzingen district (1973), and in Otterndorf (1996). In 1999, the "Prof. Carl Langhein Foundation" was created by his great-grandson, the Hamburg notary, Gerd H. Langhein (1956–2015) Its goal is to preserve and exhibit his works, as well as the works of those associated with him. Scholarships have also been awarded.

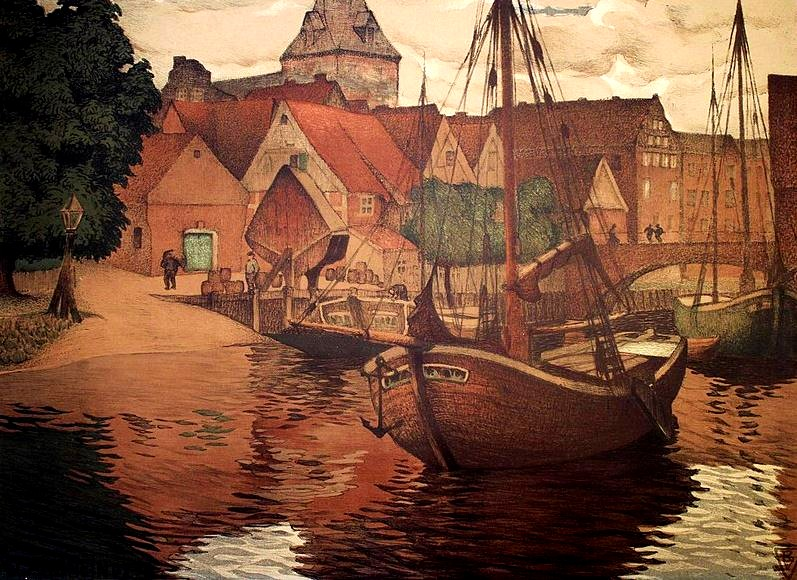
Ewer on the Medem at Otterndorf
