= Raymund Brachmann =

German architect

Raymund Brachmann (7 June 1872 – 6 March 1953) was a German architect, who created several highly regarded buildings of Jugendstil and reform architecture in Leipzig between 1900 and the First World War.

== Life ==
Born in Leipzig, Brachmann was the son of an Amtsgerichtsrat in Leipzig. After his father's early death, he studied architecture at the Technical University of Dresden.

Brachmann received his first major commission, a country house in Waldsteinberg, from a young officer's widow whom he later married.

The merchant Max Haunstein, a relative of Brachmann's wife, commissioned him to design a villa as a wedding gift for his wife. The house at Liviastrasse 8 in Leipzig, whose spatial concept was based on the position of the sun in the course of the day, was designed by Paul Horst-Schulze. It had a drinking fountain in the salon, a dumbwaiter and a luxurious bathroom. Enthused by the result, Haunstein subsequently provided Brachmann with the money for several residential buildings in Leibnizstraße.

Brachmann's main work is considered to be the very expensive so-called Märchenhaus, built in 1906/1907 in valuable materials, with portraits of Leipzig personalities designed by Johannes Hartmann at the Platz am Künstlerhaus (since 1922 Nikischplatz. On 4 December 1943, this important example of Leipzig's Art Nouveau architecture was destroyed.

Brachmann also worked with the renowned Munich Vereinigte Werkstätten für Kunst im Handwerk. He was a member of the Association of German Architects and the Leipziger Künstlerbund. Together with Paul Horst-Schulze, he participated in the 3rd German Arts and Crafts Exhibition in Dresden in 1906 on behalf of the Leipziger Künstlerbund. As early as 1907, Brachmann became a member of the Deutscher Werkbund, which had only been founded in the same year.

Brachmann died in Leipzig at the age of 80.

== Realisations ==
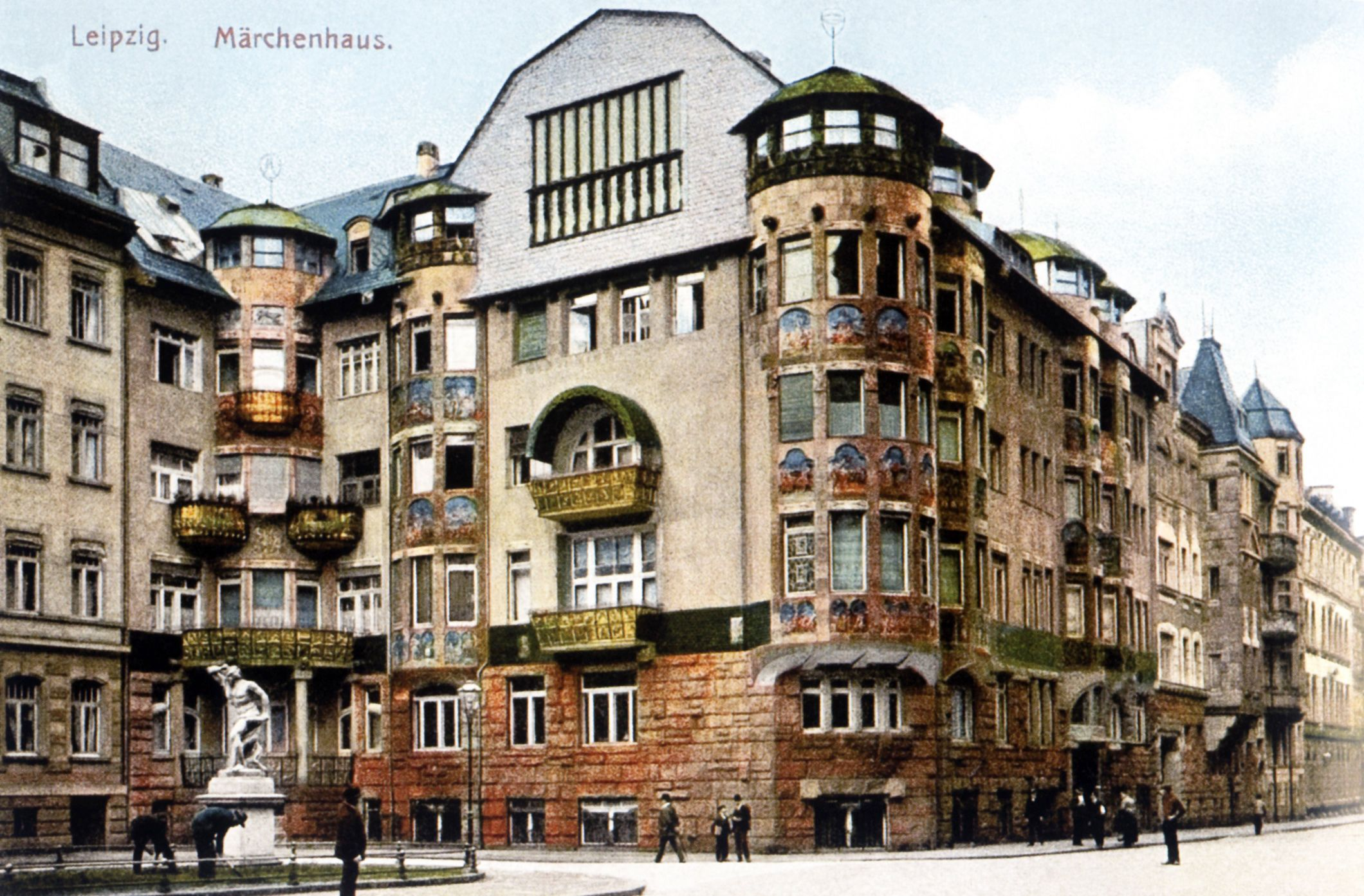
Märchenhaus am Nikischplatz

=== In Leipzig ===
- 1901–1904: Villa für den Kaufmann Max Haunstein, Liviastraße 8
- 1905: Wohnhaus Leibnizstraße 23 (war-destroyed)
- 1905: Wohnhaus Leibnizstraße 25
- 1905: Wohnhaus Leibnizstraße 27 (zu DDR-Zeiten Sitz des Kreisjugendarztes)
- 1906/1907: Märchenhaus, Platz am Künstlerhaus (since 1922 Nikischplatz; war-destroyed)
- 1907–1909: Umbau des Stadtpalais des Pelzhändlers Friedrich Wilhelm Dodel, Leibnizstraße 26/28 (erbaut 1862 von Otto Klemm, erweitert von Heinrich Purfürst; zu DDR-Zeiten Haus der Jungen Pioniere Georg Schwarz)
- 1909–1915: Closed row of detached houses, Windscheidstraße 28, 30, 32, 34 (severely affected by later alterations and partial demolition of the head buildings.)
- 1911: Villa für den Kaufmann Theodor Hartmann, Windscheidstraße 22

=== In other locations ===
- 1904: Gardener's house with tower and blind truss to the villa of the merchant Walter Polich built by Gustav Steinert in Gautzsch, Mehringstraße 16
- 1918: Cemetery grove of honour for soldiers killed in the First World War Püchau

== Publications ==
- Das ländliche Arbeiterwohnhaus. Baureife Entwürfe für Landarbeiterwohnhäuser mit Stall im Preise von 3500–5000 Mark. (Hervorgegangen aus dem Wettbewerbe der Landwirtschaftlichen Sonder-Ausstellung der Internationalen Baufachausstellung Leipzig 1913). Verlag der Gesellschaft für Heimkultur, Wiesbaden 1913.
