= Ludwig Paffendorf =

German architect

Ludwig Paffendorf (21 September 1872 – 31 January 1949) was a German architect and craftsman.

== Life ==
Born in Cologne, Paffendorf began studying architecture at the Technische Hochschule in Charlottenburg (now Technische Universität Berlin) in the winter semester of 1890/1891 and became a member of the Corps Saxonia-Berlin in the same semester. In the winter semester of 1891/92, he transferred to the University of Stuttgart and became a member of the Corps Stauffia.

After his studies, he worked for a long time in the studio of Friedrich Ohmann in Prague before settling in Cologne in 1898 as an architect and craftsman. Here he initially distinguished himself by building several villas in the Marienburg district, such as the castle-inspired villa at Lindenallee 19, which was built in 1908 and 1909.

In 1912, at the latest, he was appointed as a member of the Deutscher Werkbund. At the 1914 Werkbund Exhibition, he was involved with three works, the "Kölner Haus" and the pavilion of the Alenfelder tobacco shop as architect, as well as the furnishing of the upper floor in the "two-storey villa house (also „Etagenhaus“).

During the First World War, Paffendorf designed numerous war graves in southern Belgium from 1917 onwards as a building construction advisor in the civil administration for Wallonia. Examples are the Anloy cemetery and the Halanzy cemetery. In 1934, he erected the memorial in Cologne-Urbach for the soldiers of Urbach and Elsdorf who died in the First World War.

In 1932, Paffendorf created the designs for the garden city Grengel in Cologne-Porz in the "settler style". He did not live to see the realisation of his plans in 1949. In 1958, the Catholic kindergarten in Grengel was built according to his plans.

In addition to his work as an architect, Paffendorf was also a painter. Four of his paintings from the year 1910 are in the collection of the Kölnisches Stadtmuseum.

Paffendorf played a decisive role in organising art exhibitions in the Flora Botanical Garden before the First World War. He had been a member of the board of the Cologne Art Association since 1909.

Since 10 May 1906, he had been married to Katharina Froitzheim, née Schmidt (1877–1946), daughter of the architecture professor Heinrich von Schmidt, widow of the history painter Heinrich Froitzheim.

Paffendorf died in Cologne Porz-Urbach at the age of 76.

He bequeathed his estate to the Porz City Archives. In Köln-Rath the Paffendorfstraße is named after him.

== Work ==
=== Publication ===
- Ludwig Paffendorf, Paul Clemen: Südbelgische Kriegerfriedhöfe. Pontos, Berlin 1927.

=== Buildings ===
- 1896–1897: Bonn, Mehlem district, Rüdigerstraße 10, Villa for his father Jakob Paffendorf (later first embassy of Benin).
- 1921–1922: Cologne, Neustadt-Nord district, Friesenplatz, 27, Exhibition building of the Kölnischer Kunstverein in neoclassical style (destroyed).
- Cologne, Mülheim district, Schwestern- und Ärztehaus.
- Cologne, Rath/Heumar district, Schloss Röttgen, stock and homestead buildings for Peter Mülhens.
- 1926/1927: Königswinter, design of the car road to the Petersberg.
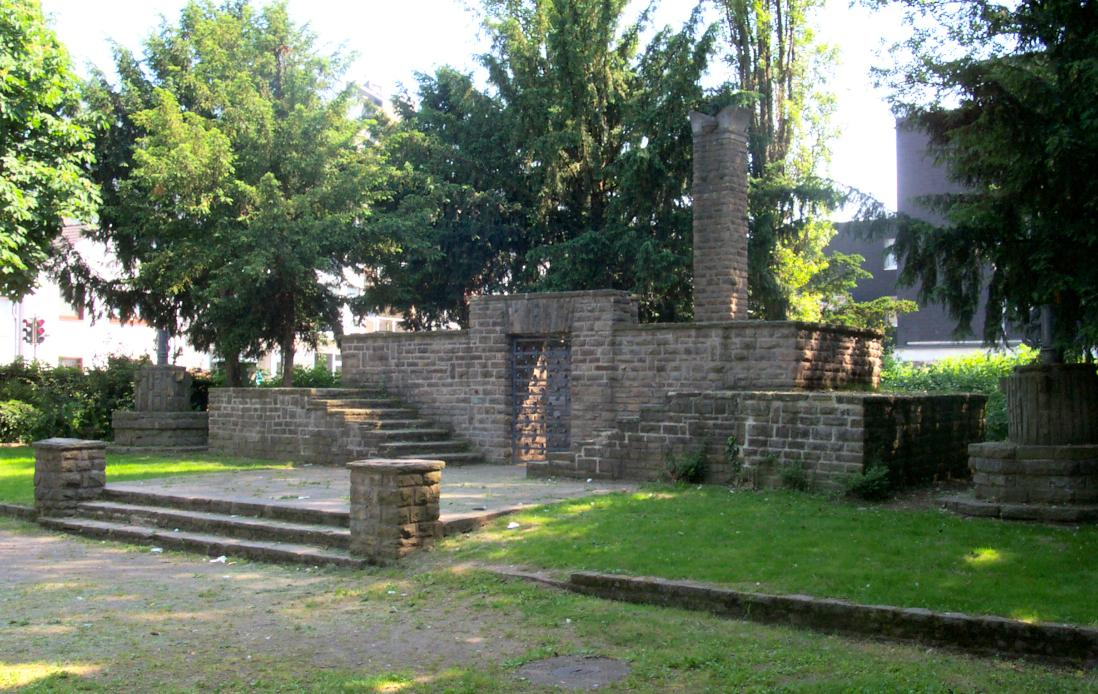
Ehrenmal Urbach

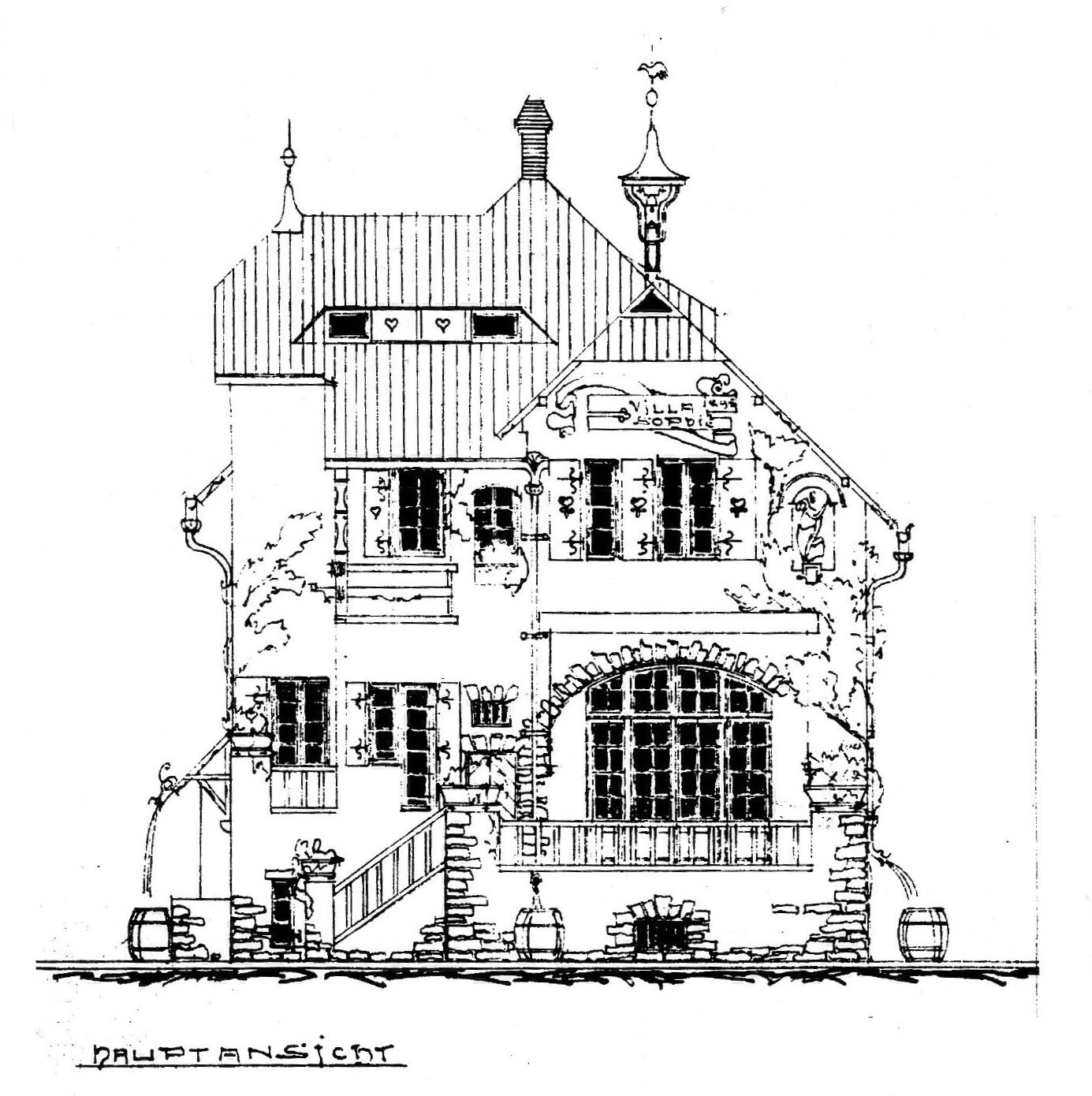
Villa Paffendorf
