= Paul Horst-Schulze =

German painter and graphic artist

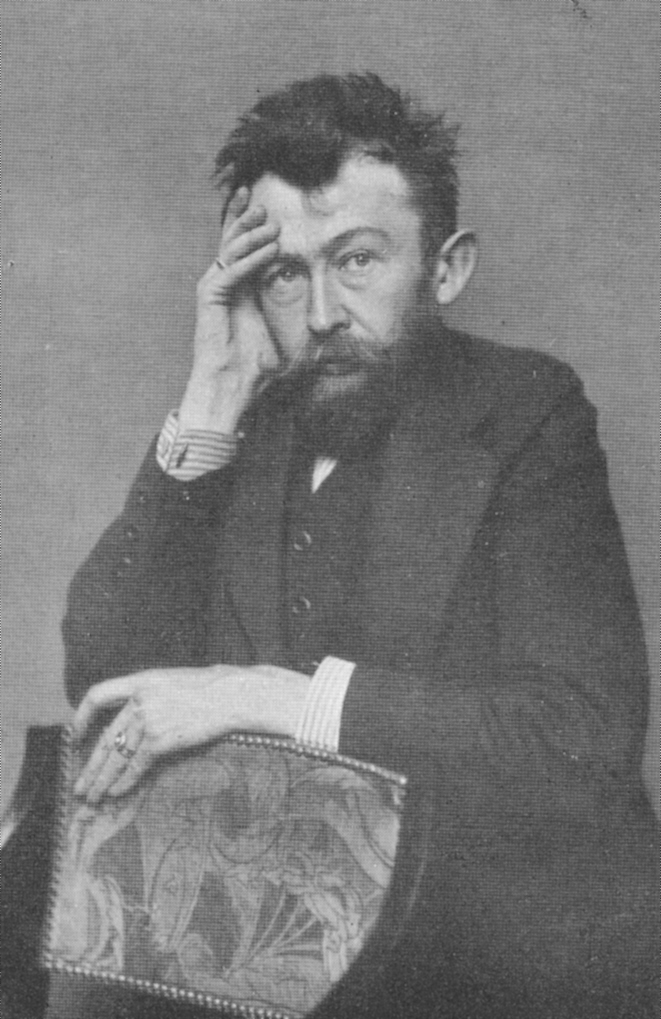
Paul Horst-Schulze

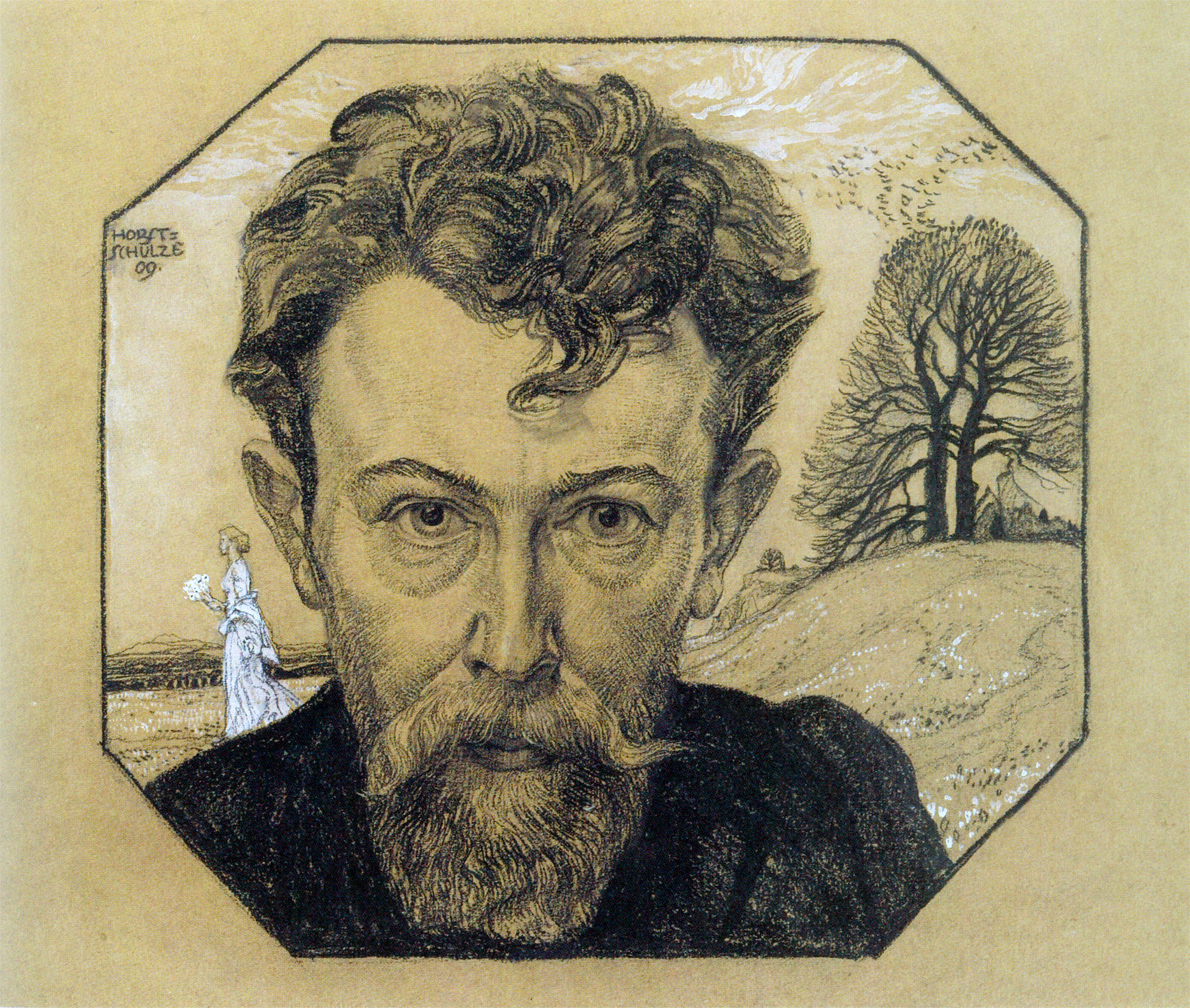
Paul Horst-Schulze, self-portrait (1909), on the left his wife Wera, on the right the tree from which he fell

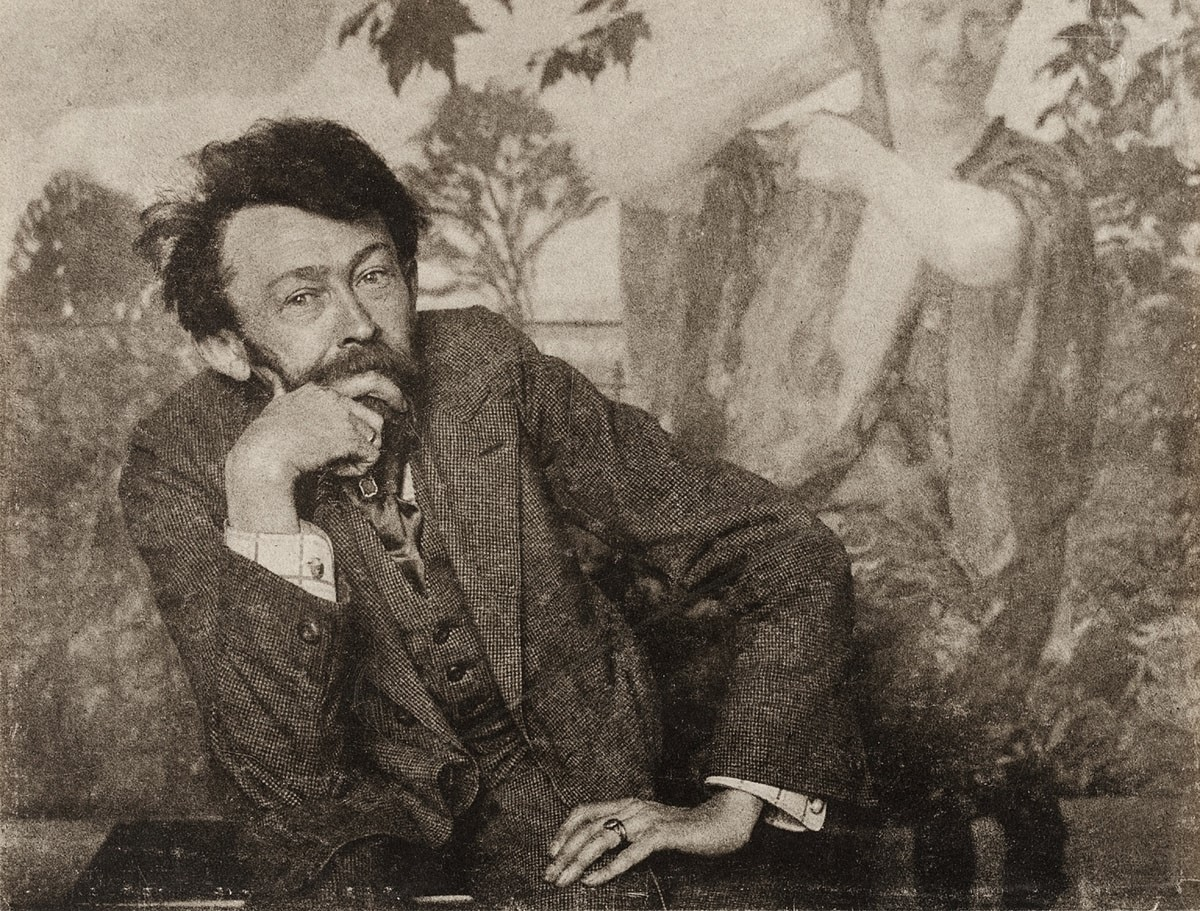
Paul Horst-Schulze (1915). photo: Hugo Erfurth

Paul Horst-Schulze (5 October 1876 – 27 December 1937) was a German painter, graphic artist and artisan. His stage name Horst-Schulze came about by combining his middle name with his original family name.

== Life ==
Born in Naunhof, Horst-Schulze was a son of the Naunhofer pastor Moritz Hermann Schulze (1828-1909). At the age of seven, he suffered a serious back injury when he fell from a tree. Since he concealed the accident out of fear of his father, without medical treatment his back became so deformed that he had a hump for the rest of his life. At that time, this was a reason not to take up the training as a pastor that his father was aiming for. Instead, he studied at the Hochschule für Grafik und Buchkunst Leipzig from 1891 and at the Akademie der Bildenden Künste München from 1894, as well as one year at the Kunstakademie Düsseldorf. When he returned to Leipzig at the beginning of the 20th century, he was considered one of the most talented young Leipzig artists.

After designing home furnishings and samples for fabrics, his first major commission was the decoration of the Gnadenkirche in Leipzig-Wahren. For the church, which was built from 1901 to 1904 according to plans by the architect Raymund Brachmann (1872-1953) for the merchant Max Haunstein, he created the interior design of one of the most beautiful Jugendstil villas in Leipzig.

He designed many illustrations as well as book decorations for children's and youth publications, especially for the publishing house of Eugen Diederichs (1867–1930). His first paintings were shown at the 1903 Saxon Art Exhibition in Dresden and in 1904 at the House of the Berlin Secession, as well as in 1909 at the collective exhibition of the Leipzig Artists' Association.

In 1904 Horst-Schulze obtained a teaching post at what was now the Royal Academy for Graphic Arts and Book Trade in Leipzig, which was converted into a professorship in figurative painting in 1911. This appointment enabled him to start a family, and he married Wera Wagner in 1907. The couple moved into the newly built Märchenhaus on today's Nikischplatz, which was destroyed during the Second World War. Both were friends with the painter and sculptor Max Klinger (1857–1920).

in 1907, Horst-Schulze was one of the first members of the Deutscher Werkbund and founded the Saxon section of the federation together with Raymund Brachmann. He was also a member of the Deutscher Künstlerbund, the Leipziger Künstlerbund and the Leipziger Jahresausstellung association.

Schulze died Leipzig at the age of 61.

== Work (selection) ==
- 1901: Ausgestaltung der Gnadenkirche in Leipzig-Wahren
- 1901–1904: Ausstattung der Villa Haunstein, among others Wandbild Die Heimkehr aus dem Sagenkreis um König Rother
- 1908: Porträt des Leipziger Oberbürgermeisters Otto Georgi (1831–1918)
- 1909: Sonnenstudie Wera in Grün, oil on canvas
- 1909: Wandbild in Auerbachs Keller
- 1909: Entwurf der farbigen Bleiglasfenster für die Treppenhäuser in Specks Hof in Leipzig
- 1913: Sommertag in der Provence, oil on canvas
- 1918: Schiller, Strichätzung 1918
- 1920: Mutter und Kind, oil on wood
- 1920: Arbeiter, Pinsel- und Federzeichnung in schwarzer Tusche
- 1920: Max Klinger auf dem Totenbett, lithography
- 1921: Blick auf das Saaletal von Max Klingers Besitzungen aus, oil on canvas
- 1924/25: Wandgemälde Die Verherrlichung der Fröbelschen Menschenerziehung in der ehemaligen Hochschule für Frauen zu Leipzig in der Goldschmidtstraße. Zuvor Vorstudie als Gouache. Wandbild übermalt, soll wieder freigelegt werden.
- 1930: Sommerblumenstrauß in einer Vase, oil on wood
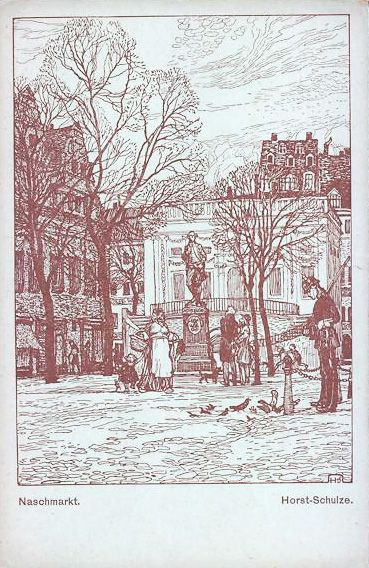
Post card: Naschmarkt

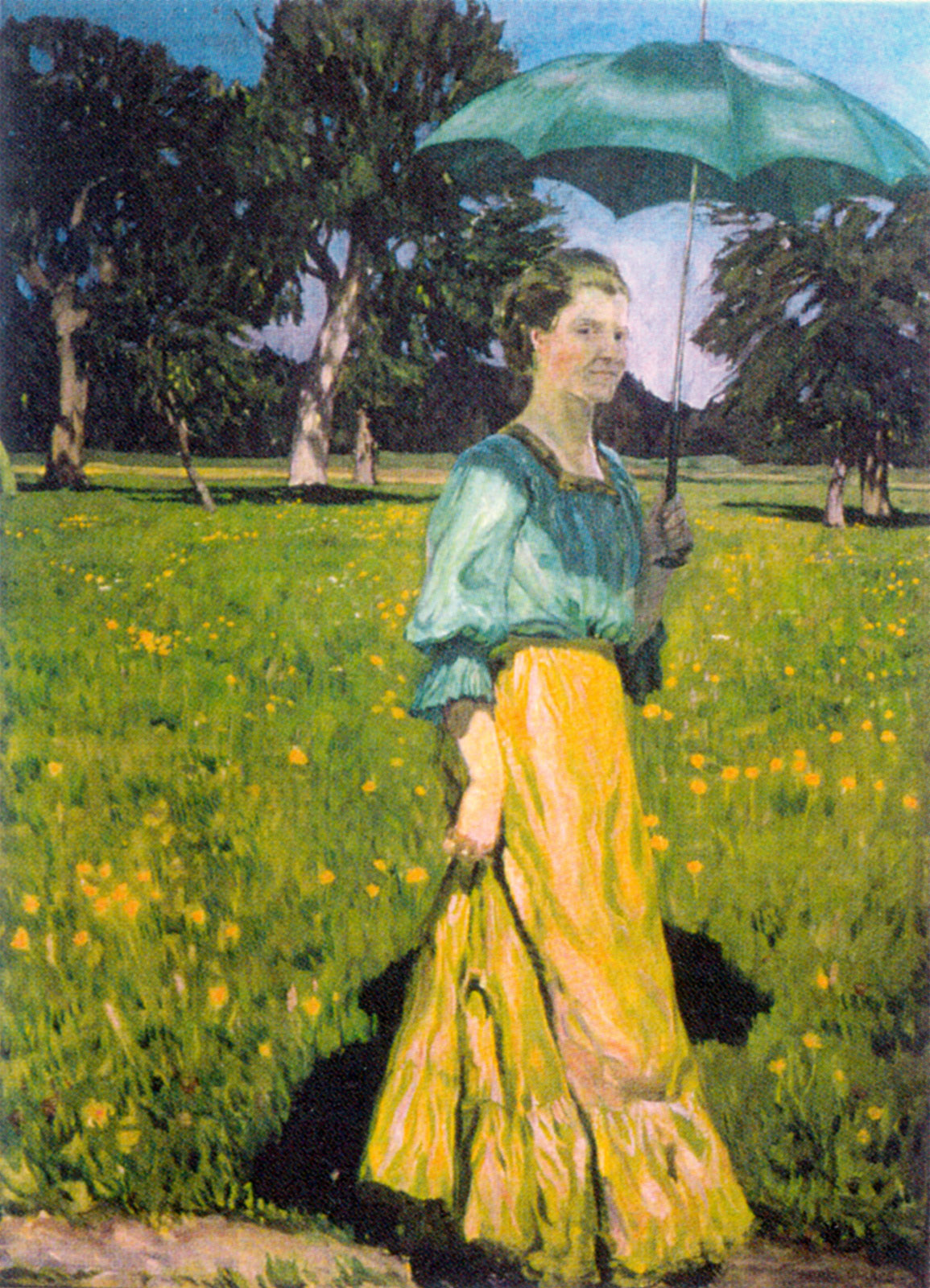
Wera in Grün

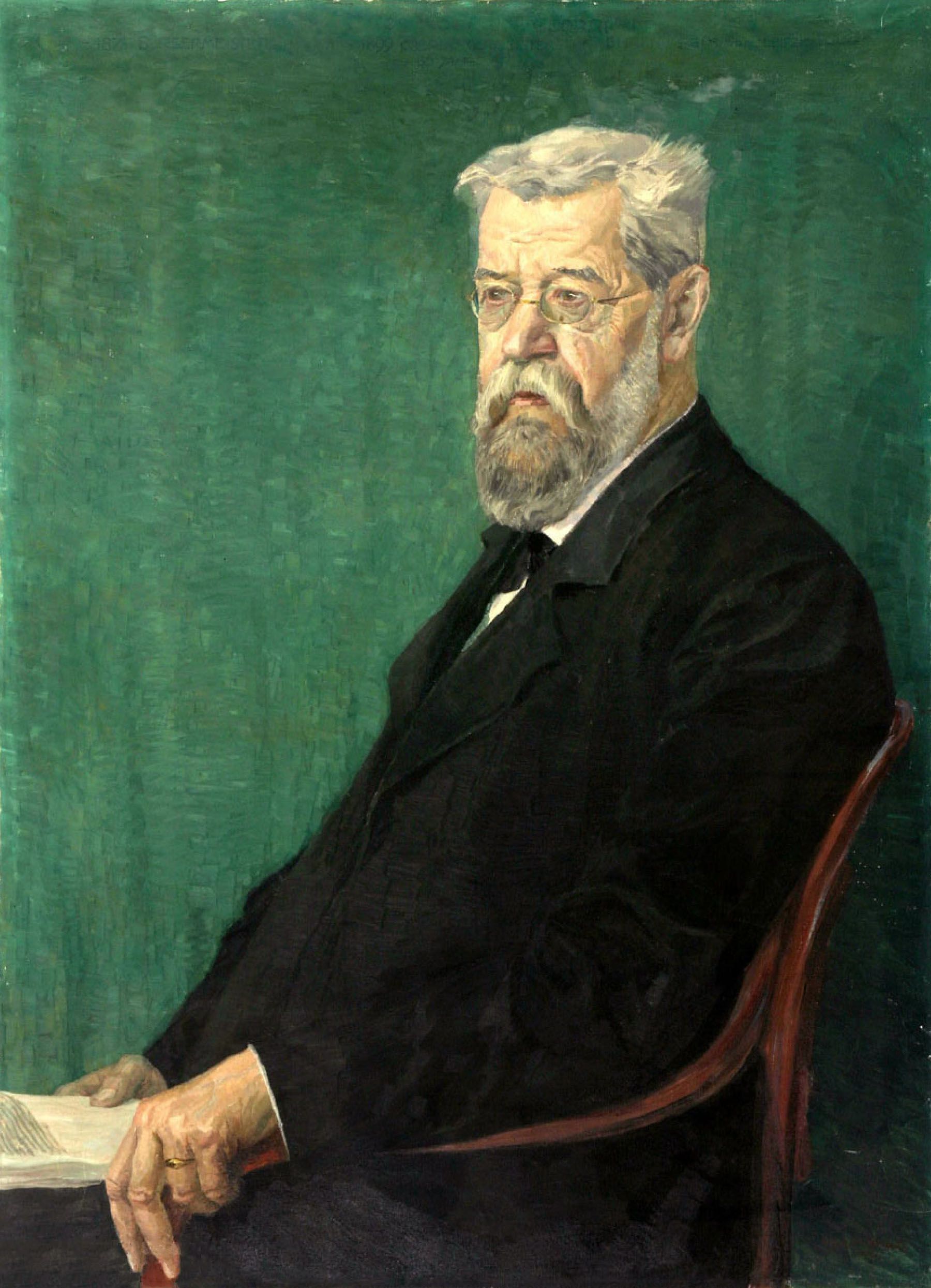
Oberbürgermeister Georgi

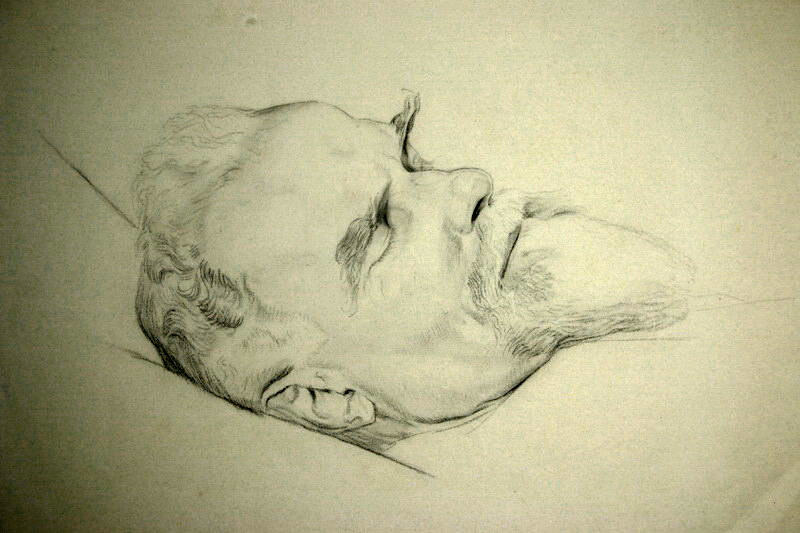
Klinger auf dem Totenbett

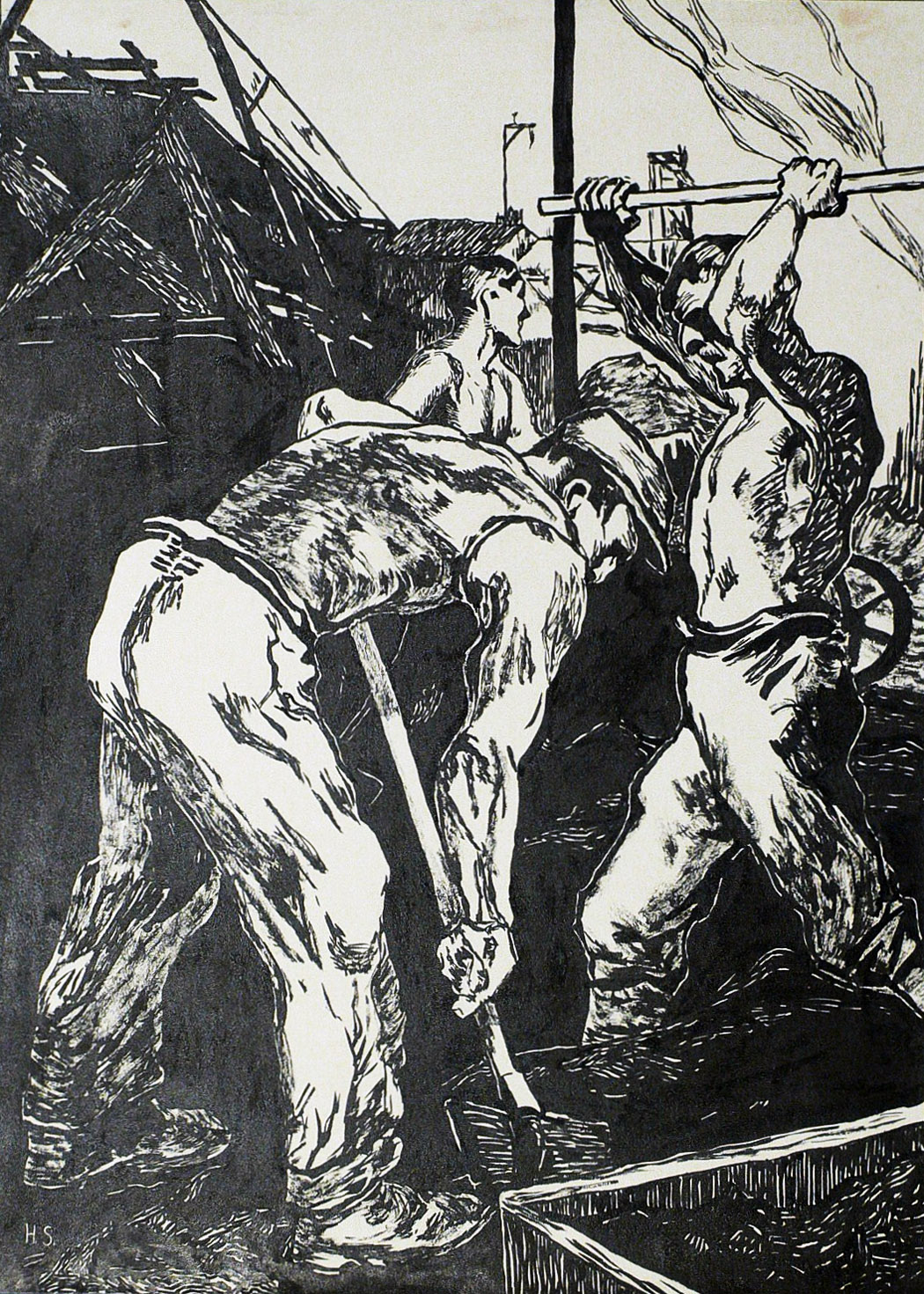
worker

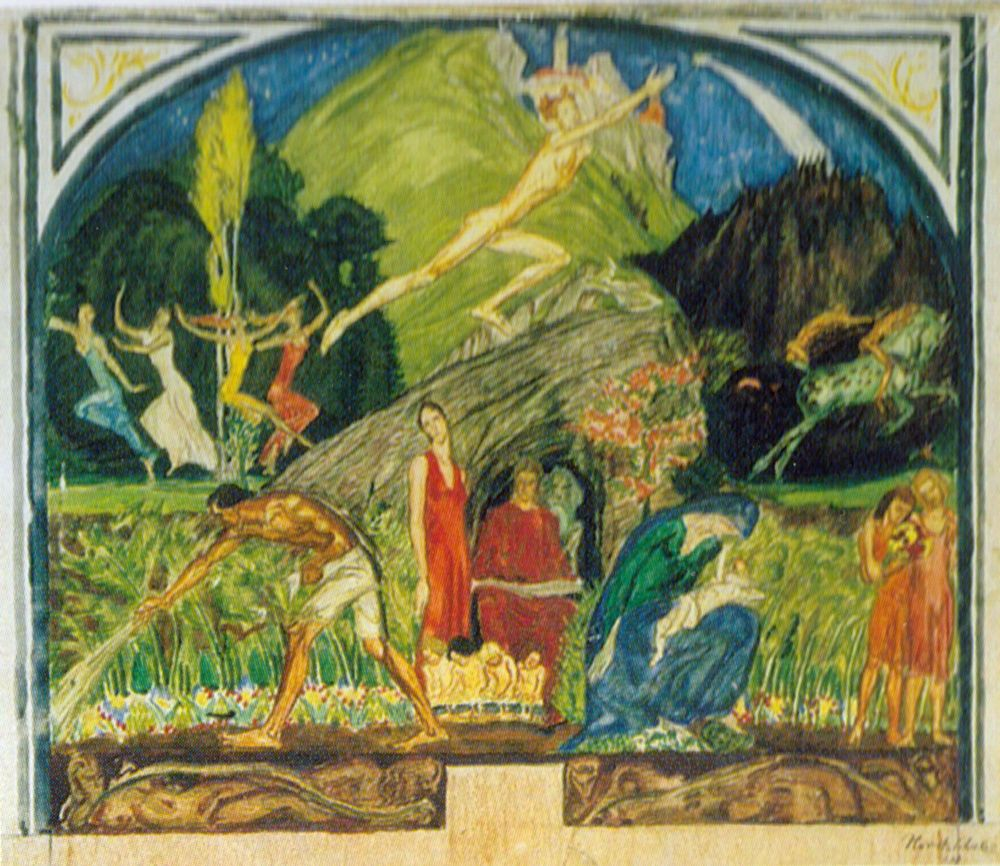
Entwurf für das Wandbild Goldschmidtstraße
