= Karl Ganser =

German urban planner (1937–2022)

- Born: September 15, 1937; Mindelheim
- Died: April 21, 2022 (aged 84); Breitenthal
- Occupations: Geographer, Urban planner

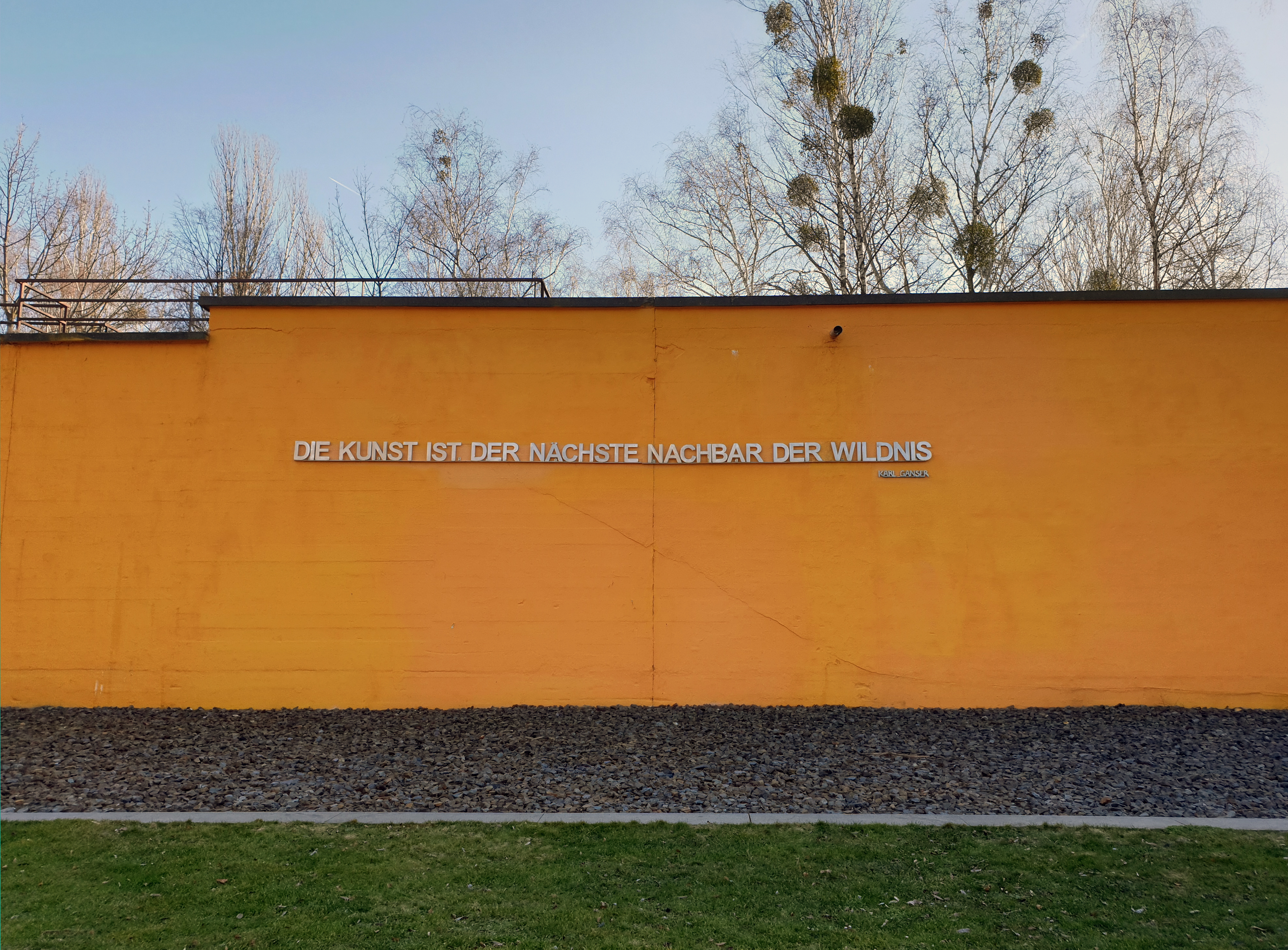
Dedication at Natur-Park Südgelände, in Berlin-Schöneberg (2019)

Karl Ganser (15 September 1937, Mindelheim – 21 April 2022, Breitenthal) was a German geographer, urban planner, and former managing director of the International Architecture Exhibition Emscher Park.

== Biography ==
Karl Ganser was born the son of a farmer. After studying chemistry, biology, and geography at the Technical University of Munich, Ganser completed his doctorate in 1964 with a dissertation on "A socio-geographical division of the city of Munich based on election results. Possibilities of a socio-spatial division of cities based on the behavior of the population in political elections" and in the same year became an assistant and lecturer at the Geographical Institute of the TH Munich.

In 1967, Ganser moved to the urban development department of the city of Munich as project manager. He habilitated in 1970, and in 1971, he became the head of the Institute for Regional Studies in Bonn. He merged it with the Institute for Regional Planning to form the then Federal Research Institute for Regional Studies and Regional Planning Federal Research Institute for Regional Studies and Regional Planning (now part of the Federal Office for Building and Regional Planning), of which he remained director until 1980. From 1980 to 1989, he was head of urban planning at the Ministry for Regional and Urban Development of the state of North Rhine-Westphalia.

From 1989 to 2000, Ganser held the position of managing director of the International Architecture Exhibition Emscher Park (IBA). As IBA managing director, he focused on transformation of old industrial areas and the restoration of the landscape in the Emscher Landschaftspark. He also advocated for the preservation of industrial heritage and prevented the demolition of the Zollverein Coal Mine Industrial Complex in Essen, the Gasometer Oberhausen, the Jahrhunderthalle in Bochum, the Kokerei Hansa in Dortmund, and the Meiderich Steelworks in Duisburg-Meiderich (now a central part of the Landschaftspark Duisburg-Nord). Ganser's achievement was to give new meaning to the industrial age buildings and to enable unforeseen uses: the largest gas holder in Europe was turned into an exhibition hall, and a steelworks was declared a landscape park.

Ganser retired in 1999 but continued to work as a publicist, expert, and mediator. He was appointed as a mediator in the dispute over the Waldschlößchen Bridge in Dresden. Throughout his career, Ganser focused on the preservation of industrial monuments, including the Gaswerk Augsburg, and to urban renewal projects. He also focused on ecological issues. In 2011, Ganser provided consulting services for the restoration of the Sayner Hütte in Bendorf on the Middle Rhine.

== Honors and awards ==
In 1999, Ganser received an honorary doctorate from the Ruhr University Bochum, particularly for his work as "one of the architects of the new Ruhr area". In 2003, Ganser received the Staatspreis des Landes Nordrhein-Westfalen. He received an honorary title Citizen of the Ruhr Area since 1995 and was made an honorary member of the Association of German Architects (BDA) in 1997. In 2001, he was awarded the Cultural Groschen of the German Cultural Council, which he refused to accept in protest against the destruction of the industrial monument Vockerode.

In 2007, Karl Ganser received the Bavarian Nature Conservation Prize for his commitment to urban renewal projects, land conservation, and nature and environmental protection. His work at the International Building Exhibition Emscher Park from 1989 to 1999, where he initiated a circular economy in land and energy consumption, building stock, and water management based on the principle of "transformation without growth," was particularly mentioned.

== Selected works ==
- Industrial Culture in Augsburg. Pioneers and Factory Castles. Context Media and Publishing, Augsburg 2010, ISBN 978-3-939645-26-9.
- Love at Second Sight. International Building Exhibition Emscher Park 1999. Harenberg Edition, Dortmund 1999, ISBN 3-611-00824-9.
