= Christoph Zöpel =

German politician

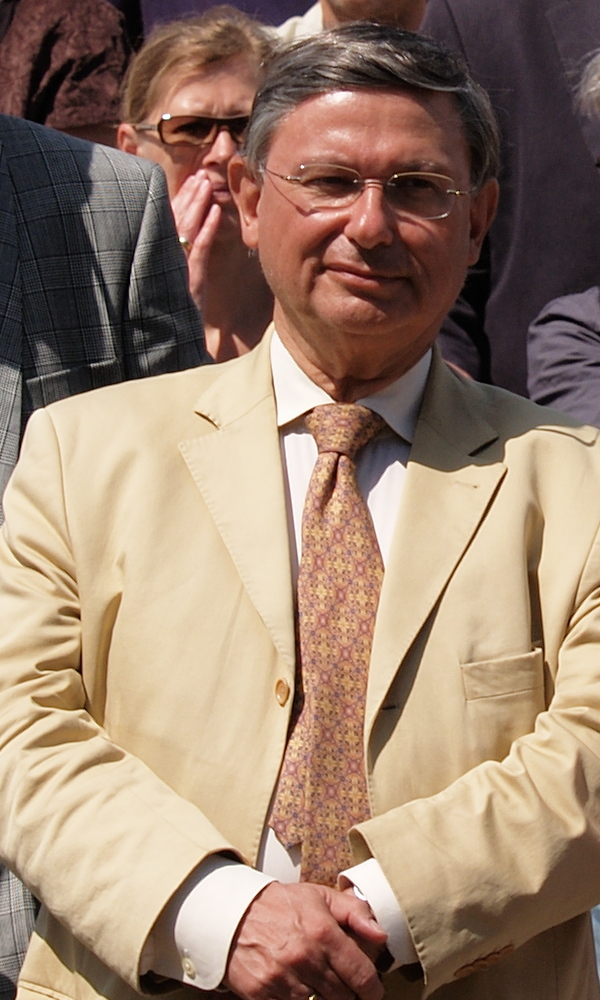
Prof. Dr. Christoph Zöpel, German politician and honorary professor at the University of Dortmund, at the opening of the Emscherkunst 2010 in Herne

Christoph Zöpel (born 4 July 1943) is a German politician of the Social Democratic Party (SPD) and professor. He was Minister for Federal Affairs from 1978 to 1980, Minister for State and Urban Development from 1980 to 1985 and Minister for Urban Development, Housing and Transport in North Rhine-Westphalia from 1985 to 1990. From 1999 to 2002, he was Minister of State at the Federal Foreign Office.

== Life ==
Zöpel was born on 4 July 1943 in Gliwice, Upper Silesia, Poland.

Zöpel currently teaches as a professor of spatial development.

== Political career ==
From 1969 to 1972, Zöpel was a councillor for the city of Bochum, and from 1972 to 1990 a member of the state parliament of North Rhine-Westphalia.

On 8 February 1978 he was appointed to the state government of North Rhine-Westphalia as Minister for Federal Affairs by Minister-president Heinz Kühn, a position he retained under Kühn's successor Johannes Rau. Zöpel was also the plenipotentiary of the state of North Rhine-Westphalia to the federal government.

After the 1980 state parliamentary elections, he was appointed Minister for Regional and Urban Development on 4 June 1980. After the 1985 state parliamentary elections, his departmental responsibilities were expanded so that he was Minister for Urban Development, Housing and Transport from 5 June 1985. After the 1990 state parliamentary elections, he resigned from the state government on 12 June 1990.

On 17 September 1999 Zöpel was appointed Minister of State at the Federal Foreign Office in the federal government led by Chancellor Gerhard Schröder. After the 2002 federal election, he left office on 22 October 2002.

As Minister for Urban Development, Housing and Transport in the state of North Rhine-Westphalia, he initiated the IBA Emscher Park in the 1980s, which was finally realized between 1989 and 1999 under the direction of Karl Ganser. He thus made a pioneering contribution to structural change in the Ruhr region.

From 1990 to 2005, Zöpel was a member of the German Bundestag, where he was Chairman of the European Economic Community from 1991 to 1993 and Chairman of the Foreign Policy Working Group of the SPD parliamentary group from 1998 to 1999. 2002–2005 Chairman of the United Nations Subcommittee.

== Awards ==
- 2017: Order of Merit of North Rhine-Westphalia
- 2018: Halstenberg Prize
