= Werkbund Exhibition – The Dwelling =

Exhibition held in 1927

1927 Stuttgart

Overview
- BIE-class: Unrecognized exposition
- Name: The Dwelling
- Area: Weissenhof Estate
- Visitors: 500,000
- Organized by: Mies van der Rohe and Lilly Reich (curators)

Location
- Country: German Reich
- City: Stuttgart

Timeline
- Opening: 23 July 1927
- Closure: October 1927

Werkbund exhibition – The Dwelling ("Die Wohnung") was an exhibition organised by Deutscher Werkbund held in Stuttgart between July and October 1927.

17 European architects were invited to design modern housing for the Weissenhof Estate. The participating architects were: Peter Behrens, Victor Bourgeois, Le Corbusier, Richard Döcker, Josef Frank, Walter Gropius, Ludwig Hilberseimer, Pierre Jeanneret, Jacobus Johannes, Pieter Oud, Hans Poelzig, Adolf Rading, Mies van der Rohe, Hans Scharoun, Adolf Schneck, Mart Stam, Bruno Taut and Max Taut. Plans and models were shown in the Stuttgart trade hall (Gewerbehalle) and housing was built at the Weissenhof Estate. Mies van der Rohe and Lilly Reich were the curators and Van der Rohe designed the estate layout.
