= Staaken Garden City =

Housing estate in Berlin

Coordinates: 52°32′27″N 13°8′49″E

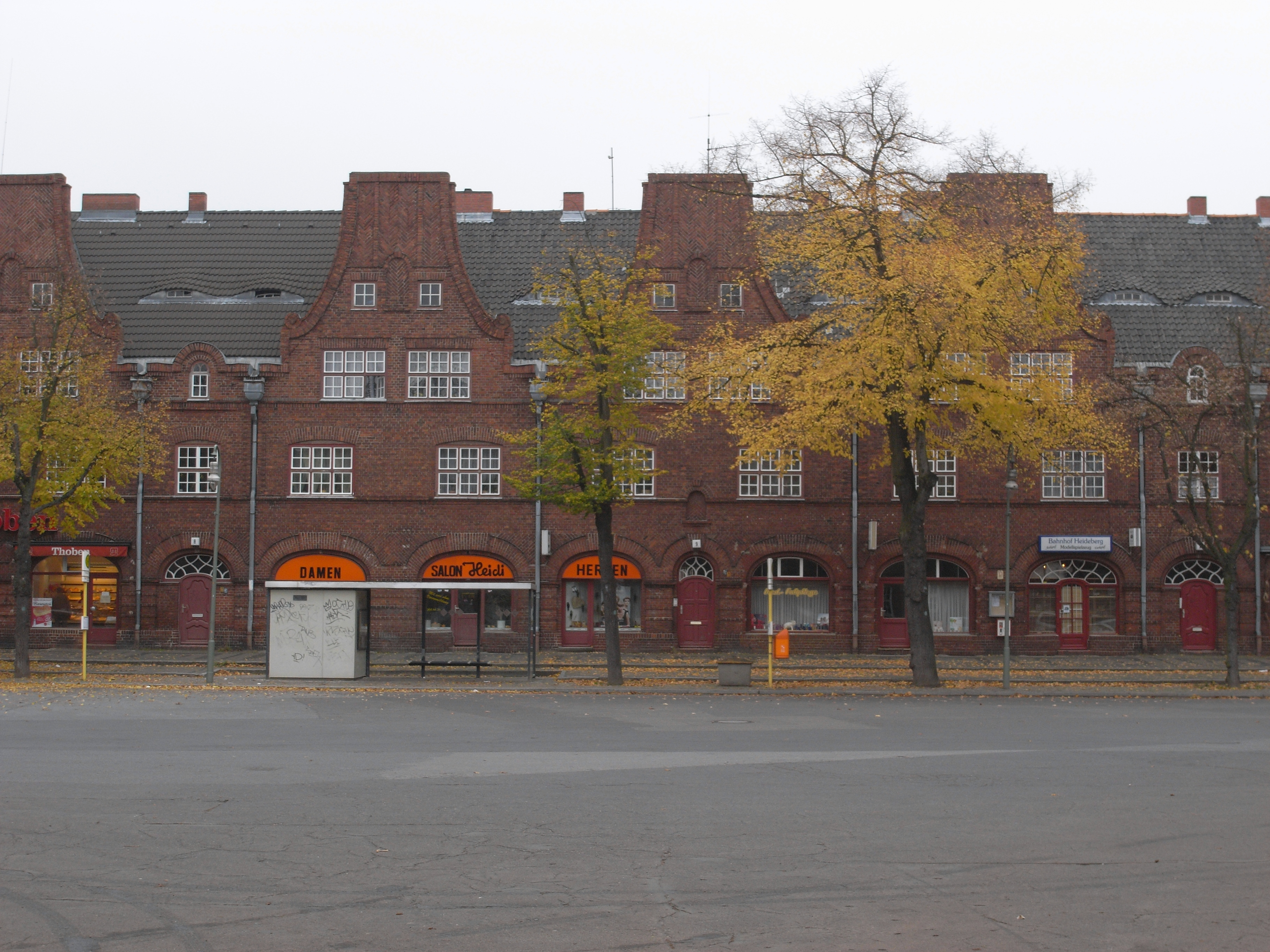
Department store at the market place

The Staaken Garden City is a housing estate located in the Berlin district of Spandau next to the old village of Staaken. It was built between 1914 and 1917 according to the design of the architect Paul Schmitthenner. It is considered one of the most significant urban development achievements of the early 20th century because of the layout of the streets and squares, the intelligent handling of house types and variations, and especially because of its model effect on the Berlin housing estates of the 1920s. The Staaken Garden City was planned with 1000 apartments and a number of public buildings for 5000 inhabitants. Unlike most other projects of this type, size and construction period, it was completed almost entirely within four years according to the original design.

== Planning ==
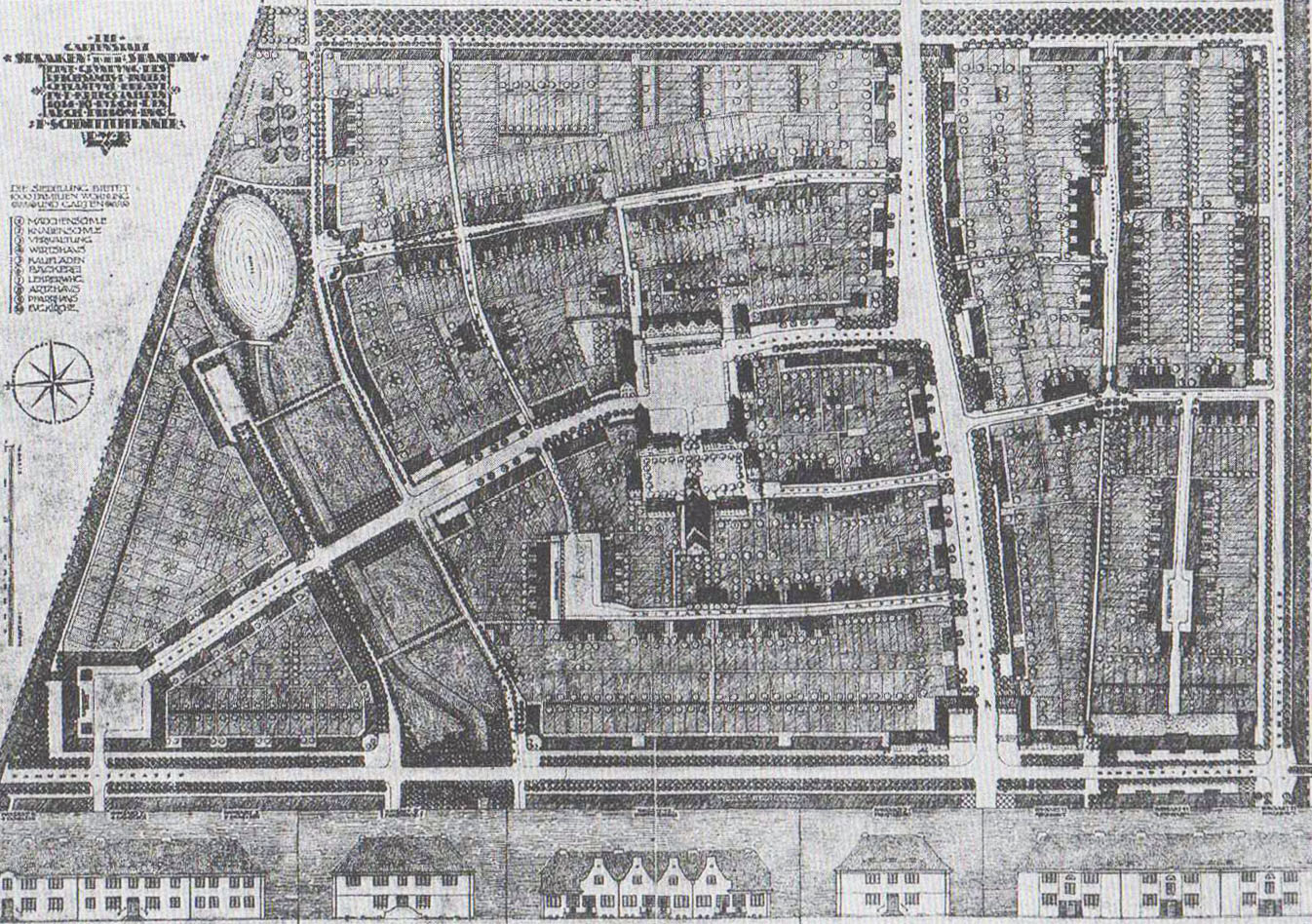
Urban layout, 1917

The client of the Staaken Garden City was the Ministry of the Interior. With this project, it wanted to reform housing construction for workers in Germany in an exemplary manner. The intended residents were those employed in the state-owned Spandau armaments factories. The availability of housing for these people was traditionally very poor. First, the Ministry bought the 35-hectare plot four kilometers west of the state-owned armaments factories in Spandau. Subsequently, the Ministry prompted the founding of a cooperative. Despite claims to the contrary, it consisted from the outset largely of ordinary workers belonging to different professions. In addition, Paul Schmitthenner, who was only 29 years old, was appointed as architect. His design was supposed to pay particular attention to the limitation of the construction costs when planning the Staaken Garden City. Therefore, the following measures were taken: all designs were the responsibility of a single architect, the number of house types was limited to a few, the components were standardized and the services of the construction companies were provided in large units. In addition, the implementation of the entire project came under the supervision of a single construction management. In 1915, the magazine “Bauwelt” reported that this would result in a saving of about a third of the usual construction costs.

Between 1914 and 1917, a total of 793 residential units were completed. In addition, in the housing estate, public buildings, such as two department stores, two schools, an inn, a church, a rectory, a large hall, and a bakery were envisaged. Under the leadership of Paul Schmitthenner, most of these buildings were realized. Only a few houses north of the green belt and the church, the inn and the bakery remained unexecuted; a church building was erected in 1922.

The structural development of the Staaken Garden City can be divided into three clearly distinguishable phases of construction, which were accompanied by a gradual simplification of the formal language. This process reflects the increasing impoverishment of the German Reich in the First World War. As a result of mobilization, construction activity came to a standstill in most places due to a lack of manpower. The Staaken Garden City construction project was an exception in this context, because this settlement was to be inhabited by the workers from the armories. But at the end of 1916, the consequences of the war were also reflected in the construction of the Staaken Garden City. Paul Schmitthenner's planning work for this housing estate ended in 1917 when he was drafted. His work was completed by the (neutral) Swiss Otto Brechbühl.

Due to his success in the field of housing estates, Paul Schmitthenner was awarded in 1918 a professorship for architectural design at the Technical University of Stuttgart. His achievements also included at that time other housing estates, such as the garden cities Plaue near Brandenburg (1915-1917) and Forstfeld near Kassel (1915-1917).

== House types and groups ==
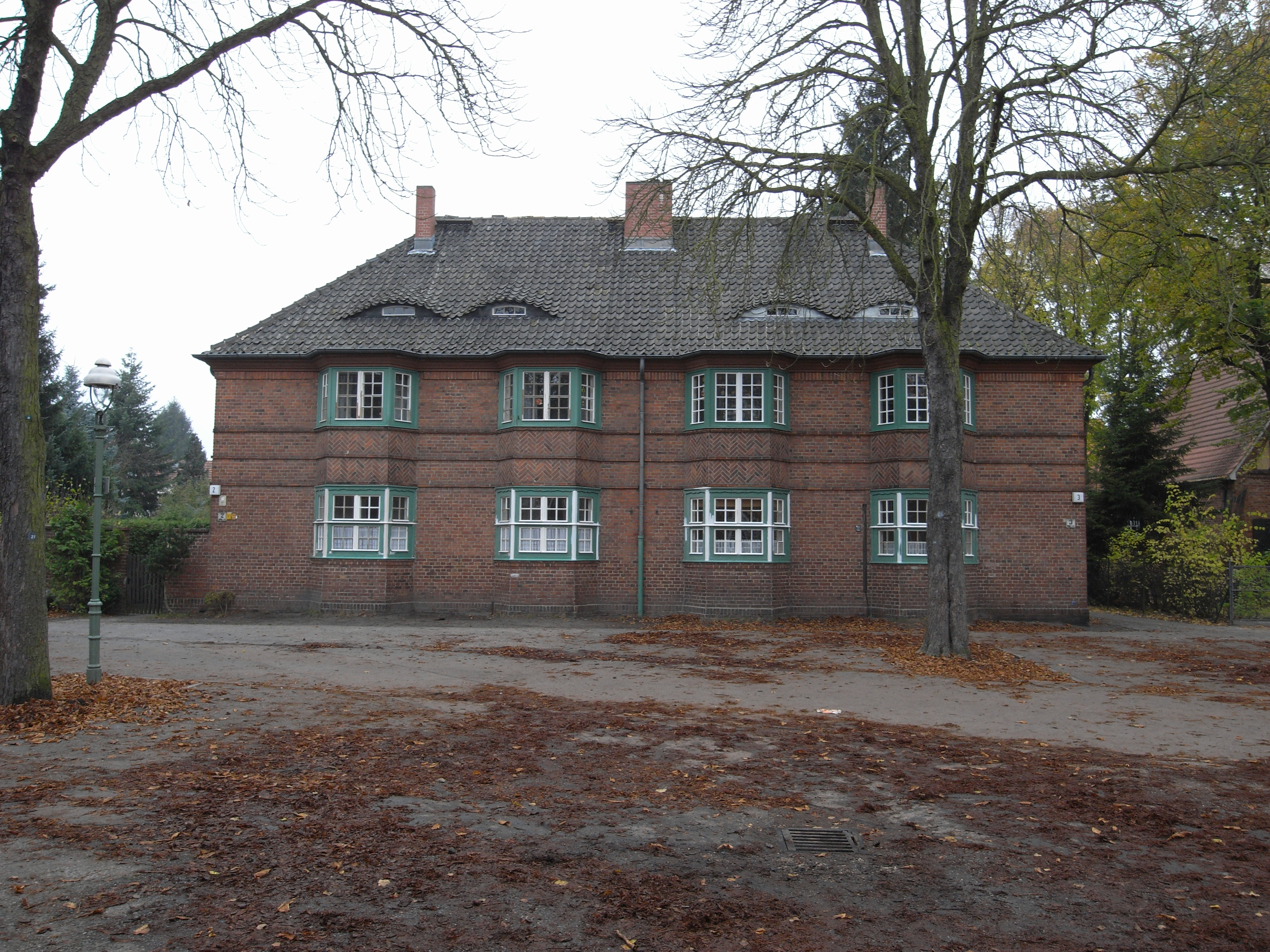
Four-family house at the church square

Paul Schmitthenner took into account the landscape and contemporary city planning requirements in his urban design for the Staaken Garden City and developed a clear yet complex system of streets and squares. The main feature of the design is a kind of modular system, with which the individual structures from five building types were put together into groups. To this system comes a certain number of facade variants and a variety of fittings, such as windows, doors, etc. This modular system is complemented in the exterior by different entrance stairs, which are similar to the house types based on the combination of different elements. In addition, the open space is structured by a complex system of stables, walls and fences. With the different combinations of these elements, different architectural moods could be created. Moreover, each house could get an individual touch. The interior division of each house type, however, was always the same. The public buildings were excluded from the described kit and were highlighted by exposed brickwork, a richer design of individual forms and an individual design (market square, church square).

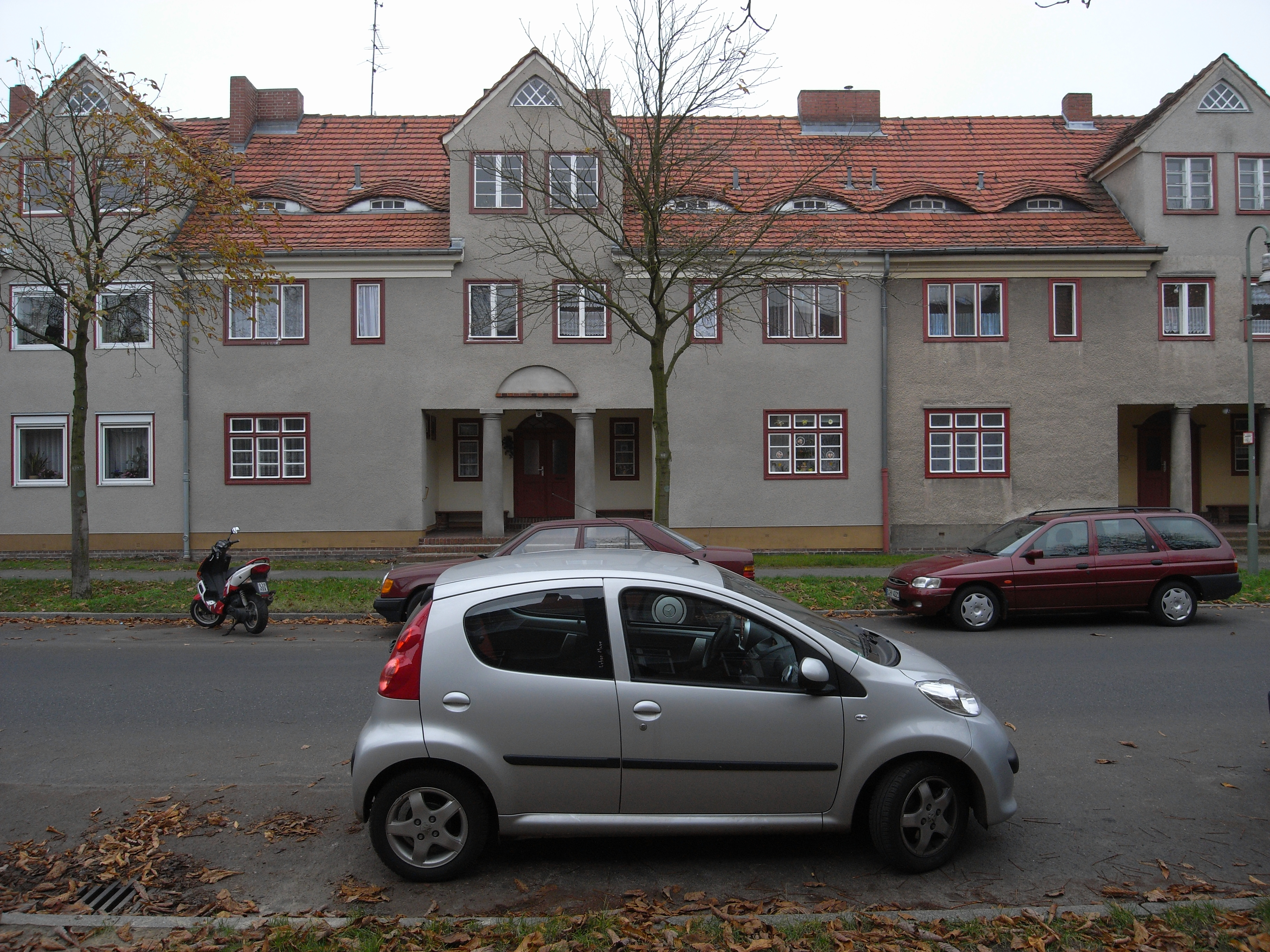
Four-family house Am Heideberg

The floor plan types 1-3 are relatively similar. They are four-family houses, each with a central corridor running from the street to the courtyard and a laterally arranged apartment on each side in both floors. The two larger house types 2 and 3 have an entrance loggia in the central axis. The house type 4 is a single family house and the house type 5 is a two-family house. The latter type is used to close apartment blocks and is the only one with the entrance on the side. The facades of the houses described in the construction kit are all plastered. The groups of houses can be slightly bent in themselves or have a porch. In the relation of the groups of houses to each other, there are sometimes mirrorings and axes, but they are never strictly carried out. Corner types are omitted in the described kit. Instead, the corners were bordered by walls. The floor plans and facades were harmoniously proportioned. Thus, the ratio of width to height is regularly graduated in the facades of the house types. It was determined in each case by means of a diagonal. The facades themselves show a relatively simple design. Paul Schmitthenner has largely renounced ornamentation.

In the first construction phase of 1914/1915, Paul Schmitthenner's house kit was fully executed. This part is located in the core of the housing estate. There, the different quarters differ significantly in their design language. One of these quarters is on the street, “Between the Gables” and the name of the streets speaks for the architectural program.

Paul Schmitthenner also dealt with the furnishing of the apartments in the Staaken Garden City. A model apartment was furnished as a showcase for the future residents. The principles for this interior design were: simplicity and clarity of form, high compatibility, functional, solid, reasonably priced and well-proportioned furniture modeled on the "Dresdner Werkstätten". Paul Schmitthenner's guideline was: " "Everything should only be decent and true. Don't make yourself look more than you are. This also makes people feel sick and indecent." Accordingly, the architect appealed to his audience:" Take a look at Schiller's apartments and Goethe's Garden House in Weimar! There you have the greatest simplicity and highest culture."

== Old and contemporary patterns ==
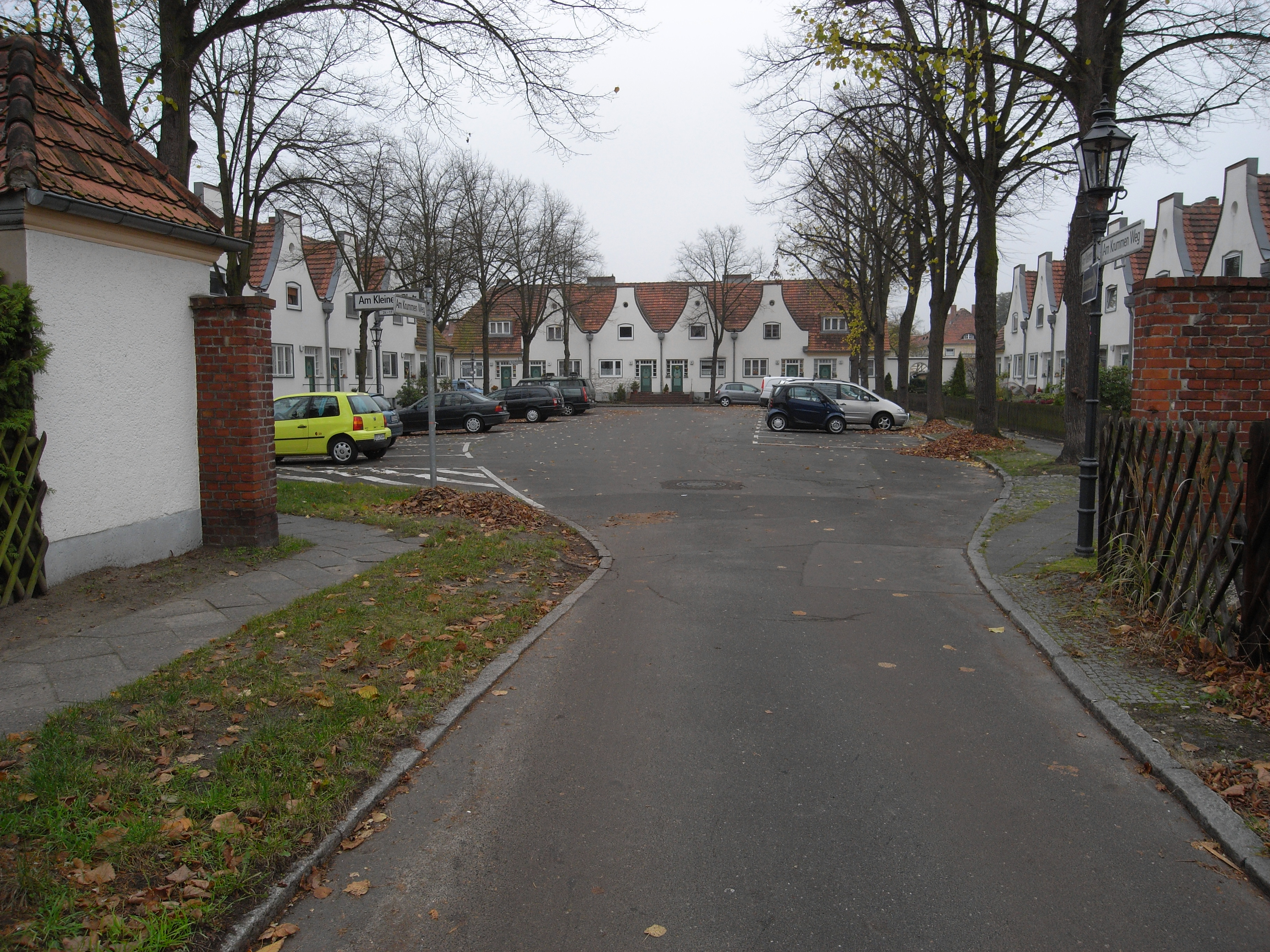
Group of single-family houses Am Kleinen Platz

Paul Schmitthenner's design with building types was based on his study of housing construction during the Baroque and Classicist periods. Such an approach can be found among all progressive architects at that time. In the Staaken Garden City, the use of the materials plaster and brick was obviously in relation to the local building tradition: plaster for housing and brick for public and religious buildings. Specifically, the architecture of the Staaken Garden City contains references to nearby Potsdam, especially the Dutch Quarter (1732-1742). In general, multi-family dwellings show a bourgeois classicist and single-family dwellings a regionalistic rural to proletarian expression. The urban design has obviously been significantly influenced by Camillo Sitte.

In his design for the Staaken Garden City in November 1913, Paul Schmitthenner was also able to draw on exemplary contemporary solutions. The initially more progressive English examples were known to the German architects mainly through the lectures and publications of Hermann Muthesius. German models were: the Hellerau Garden City 1909 by Richard Riemerschmid, the housing estate Gmindersdorf 1903 by Theodor Fischer, the housing estate Margarethenhöhe 1909 by Georg Metzendorf. Paul Schmitthenner himself was involved in the planning of the Hellerau Garden City.

== Assessment ==
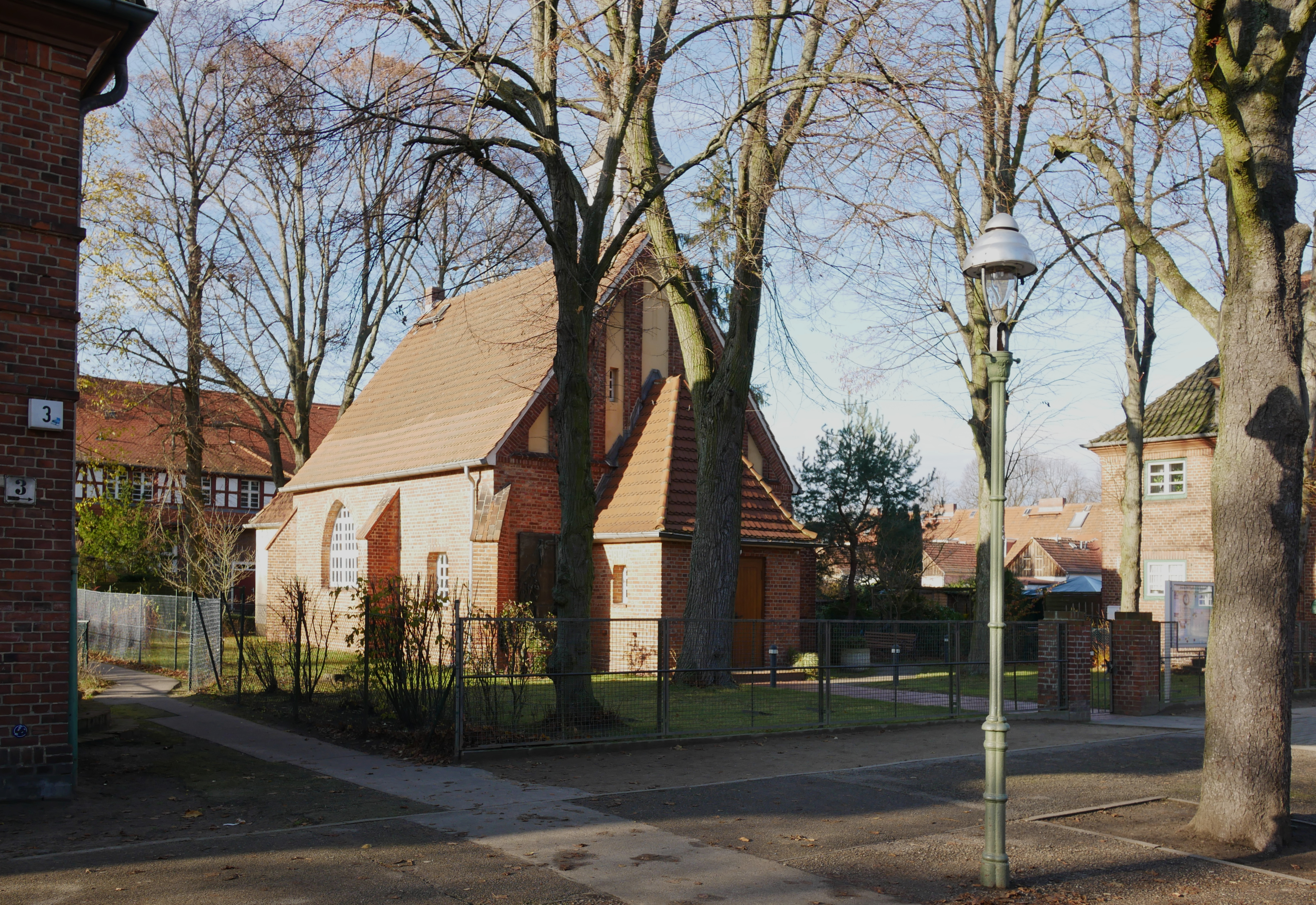
Church from 1922, in the background the rectory (1927)Architect: Curt Steinberg

Due to the high level of state support for the construction activity during the wartime and the fixation of the experience gained into norms and laws, the Staaken Garden City became in the first half of the 1920s generally the model in publicly subsidized social housing construction. Contemporaries still understood the relation to old models. Thus Fritz Stahl saw in 1917 the "certain mobility and warmth [...] achieved, as the old natural settlements of the country possess, but not by the artificial means of imitating their effects, but only by the artistic elaboration of the from necessity derived forms." It was not until 1979 that Julius Posener came to the verdict: "The illusion of the medieval small town is completely successful." In addition, he spoke in this context of "tiny little dollhouse cottages."

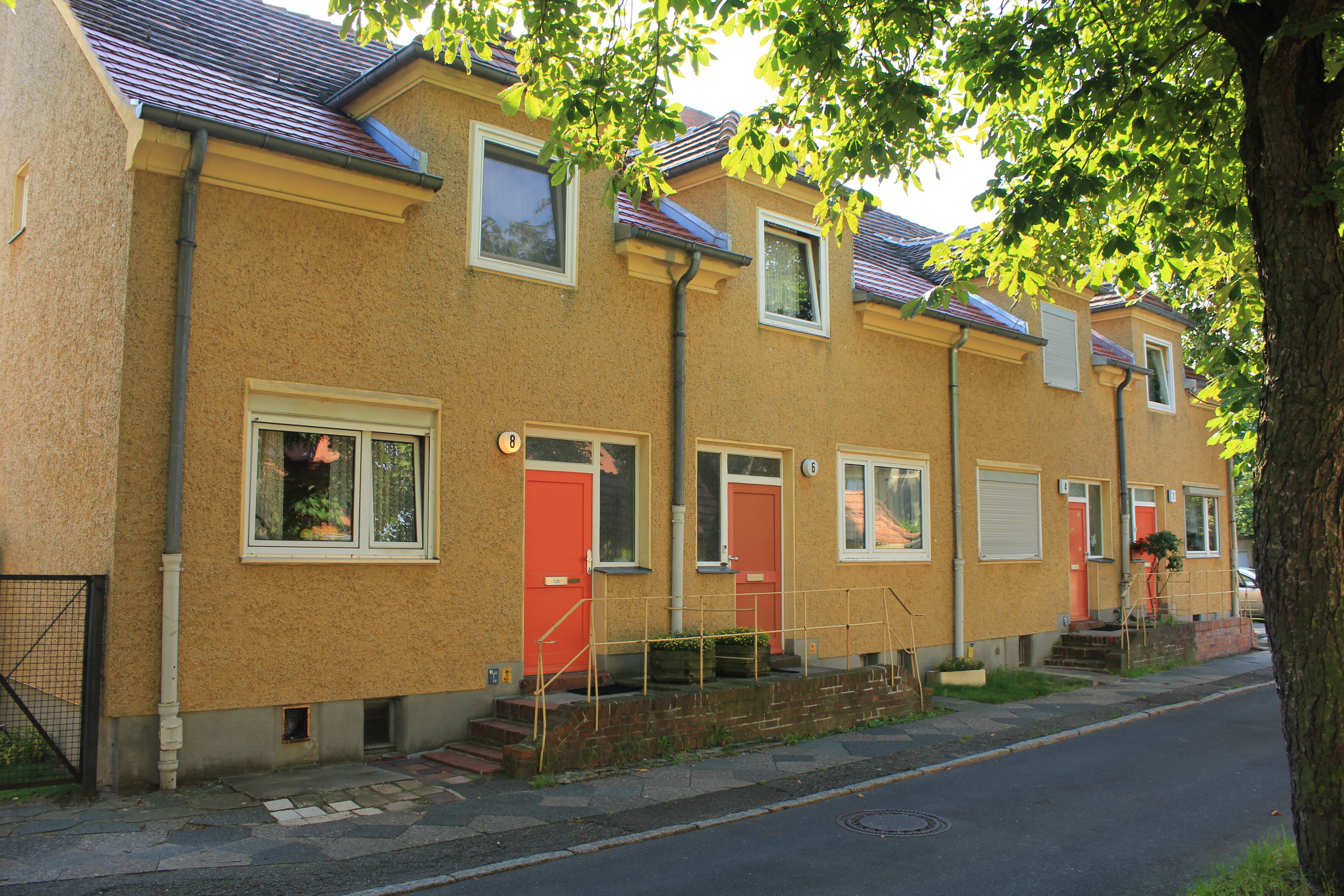
Street Beim Pfarrhof, renovation of the facades with considerable loss of the original quality, shortly before the protection as monument 1986

This assertion by Julius Posener can be explained with his pioneering role in the exploration of the reform architecture of the twentieth century in Germany. However, more recent research on this period, the architect Paul Schmitthenner and last but not least, on the Staaken Garden City clearly show the contemporary avant-garde character of this housing estate. The construction of an explicit proximity between the forms of Staaken Garden City and National Socialist architecture - as most recently in Brendgens and König - must at least since 1968 with the research Barbara Miller Lanes on the architecture of National Socialism in connection with its crude and inconsistent theory have to be referred to the field of projection.

In summary, Paul Schmitthenner's wholehearted identification with the task in the design of the Staaken Garden City led to the exemplary fulfillment of the physical and emotional needs of the residents. It is one of the most progressive in comparison with other contemporary housing estates. With its outstanding influence on the design of the well-known housing estates of Berlin Modernism from the 1920s, its importance can hardly be overestimated. Because of this significance, the Staaken Garden City was listed as a historic monument in 1986. This refers to the area designated in the development plan of 1917, including the additional buildings constructed there in the 1920s after the design by Carl Derleder in the northern settlement area, as well as the rectory and the church of the architect Curt Steinberg, which is considerably smaller than the original design. Furthermore, the green spaces of the garden architect Ludwig Lesser are included in the monument protection.

== Literature ==
- Karl Kiem: Die Gartenstadt Staaken; Typen, Gruppen, Varianten. Berlin 1997. ISBN 3-7861-1885-X.
- Wolfgang Voigt, Hartmut Frank (ed.): Paul Schmitthenner, 1884–1972. Tübingen and Berlin 2003. ISBN 3-8030-0633-3. Extended and improved edition: Paul Schmitthenner, Architekt der gebauten Form. Berlin 2021. ISBN 978-3-8030-2108-3.
