= Staaken =

- Quarter of Berlin
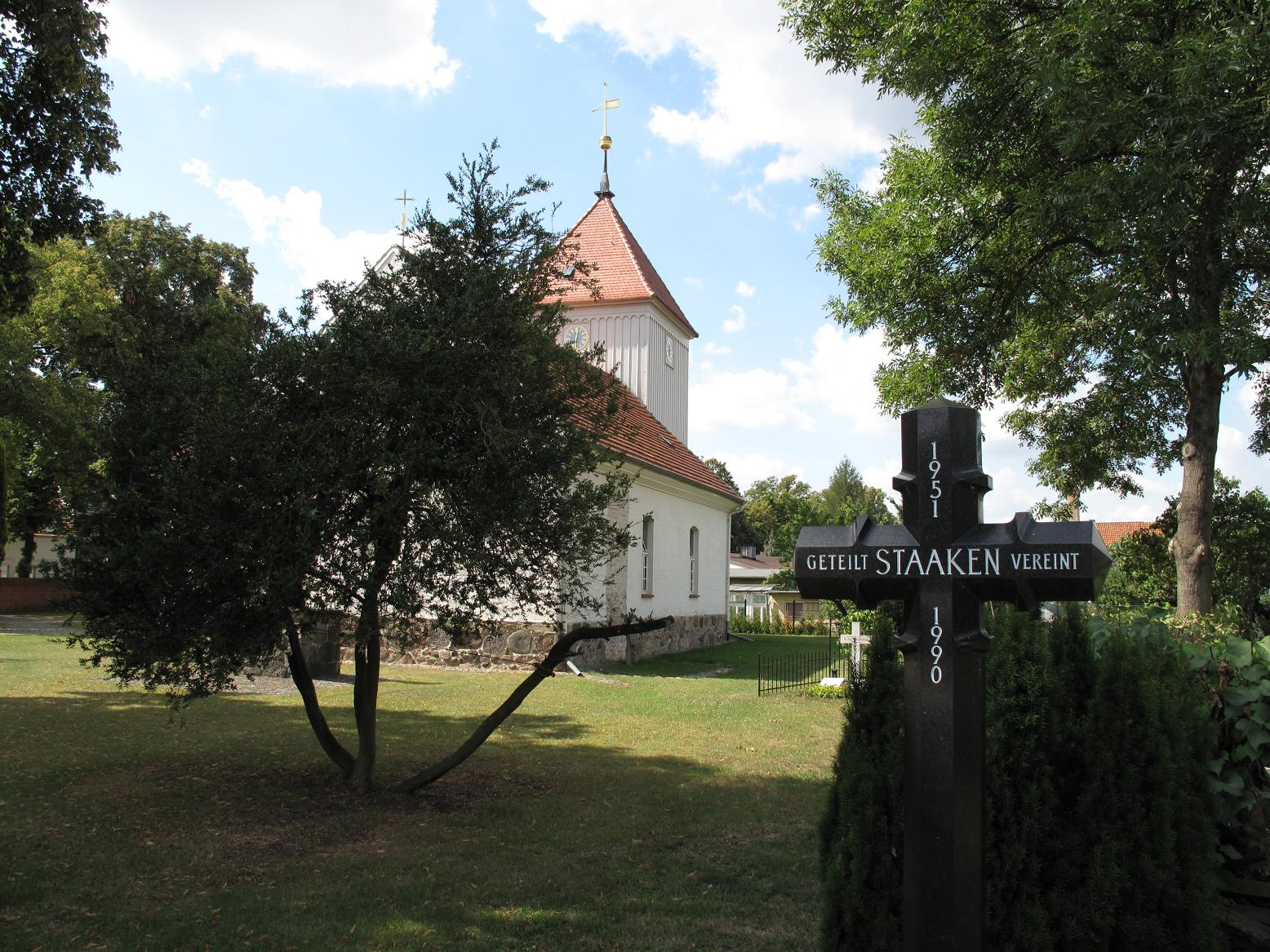
- Village church with commemoration cross to Staaken's division from 1951 to 1990

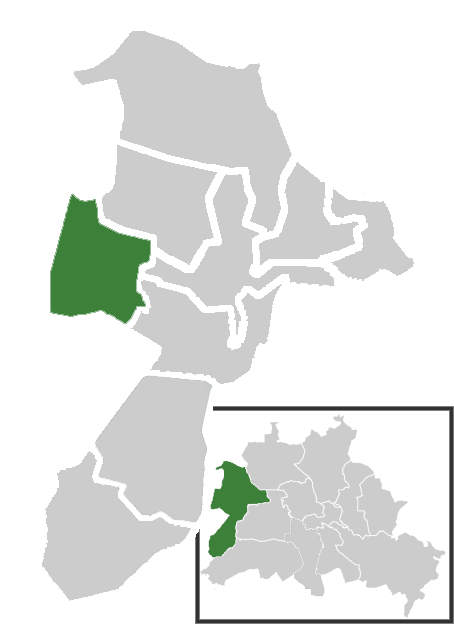
- Location of Staaken in Spandau district and Berlin
- Interactive map of Staaken
- Location within Germany Location within Berlin
- Coordinates: 52°31′57″N 13°08′29″E
- Country: Germany
- State: Berlin
- City: Berlin
- Borough: Spandau
- Founded: 1273

Area
  - Total: 10.9 km^{2} (4.2 sq mi)
- Elevation: 50 m (160 ft)

Population (2024-12-31)
  - Total: 47,315
  - Density: 4,340/km^{2} (11,200/sq mi)
- Time zone: UTC+01:00 (CET)
  - Summer (DST): UTC+02:00 (CEST)
- Postal codes: 13591
- Vehicle registration: B

Staaken (German pronunciation: [ˈʃtaːkŋ̍]) is a locality at the western rim of Berlin within the borough of Spandau.

== History ==
First mentioned in a 1273 deed as Stakene (from Middle Low German: staken, "stakes") in the Mittelmark region of the Margraviate of Brandenburg, the linear settlement probably arose around 1200 in the course of the German eastward migration. The estates were then held by the Benedictine nunnery of Spandau; after the Protestant Reformation they fell to the Spandau municipal administration.

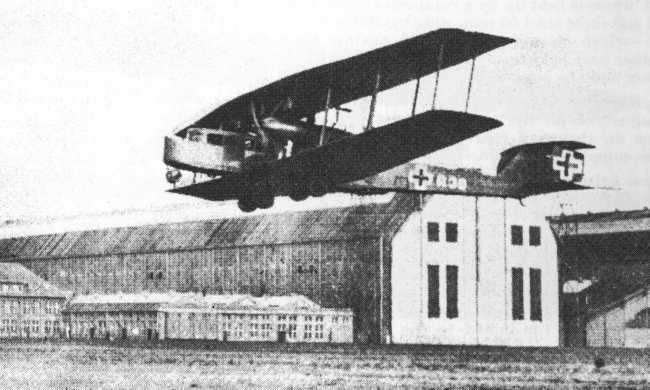
R.VI in front of the Zeppelin halls

The former village became part of Berlin by the Greater Berlin Act of 1920. The development of the area started with the construction of the Staaken garden city by architect Paul Schmitthenner in 1914. At the beginning of World War I the Luftschiffbau Zeppelin company acquired large estates in Staaken, where from 1915 on it manufactured zeppelin airships and the series of one-off Riesenflugzeug "giant" multi-engined bombers, among the largest of their day anywhere, culminating in the small series of R.VI biplane strategic bombers built by the firm.

In 1919 the regulations of the Treaty of Versailles finished the production and the area was transformed into an airfield. There had been regular Zeppelin flights to Friedrichshafen and even to London from 1919 on, though in the following years most of the aviation moved to Tempelhof Airport. The former zeppelin manufacturing halls were turned into the Staaken Studios and used as the location for various film productions, e.g. parts of Fritz Lang's Metropolis. In 1929 the estate was sold to the City of Berlin, while parts of the airport were still used by the Deutsche Luft Hansa for flight training and maintenance purposes. In Albrechtshof the Demag (Deutsche Maschinenfabrik AG) built Panther tanks during World War II using forced labour of over 2,500 prisoners held in the nearby Falkenhagen labour camp, a subcamp of the Sachsenhausen concentration camp.

=== Cold War ===
Occupied Berlin, territorial exchange visible at the western rim

After World War II Staaken was divided by a territorial exchange contract between the Allies United Kingdom and Soviet Union of 30 August 1945. The borders of the British occupational sector of Berlin were reshaped so that, that by incorporating the so-called Seeburger Zipfel it would include the entire former Luftwaffe airfield at Berlin-Gatow in the southwestern corner of this sector. In return the so-called Dorf Staaken (Staaken Village) and Albrechtshof, nowadays called West Staaken (at the most western end of the British Sector) was de jure assigned to the Soviets. The geographically eastern Staaken remained with the political West. However, the de facto administration remained with the Borough of Spandau in the British sector. So all inhabitants of Staaken could vote for West-Berlin's city state elections in 1948 and 1950.

On 1 February 1951 East German Volkspolizei took over control of West Staaken, including the airfield and adjacent Neu-Jerusalem located there, and ended the administration by the Spandau Borough; instead West Staaken became an exclave of East Berlin's then Borough of Mitte. This gave rise to the confusing fact, that the geographically western Staaken was part of the politically Eastern East Berlin at the geographically western outskirts of West Berlin, while the geographically eastern Staaken remained with the political Western British sector, thus West Berlin. East Germany then moved up its border checkpoint towards West Berlin from Dallgow more eastwards to West Staaken.

On 1 June 1952 West Staaken's de facto administration was conveyed to neighbouring East German Falkensee, which incorporated West Staaken on 1 January 1961. From 13 August the same year until its opening and removal after 9 November 1989 the Berlin Wall cut through the two parts of Staaken, with one East German border crossing on Heerstraße. Since 1 January 1971 western Staaken, officially simply named Staaken, formed a municipality of its own, with a population amounting to 4,146 at that time. On 3 October 1990, the day of unification of East Germany, East and West Berlin with the West German Federal Republic of Germany both Staakens reunited to form a locality of the Spandau Borough.

=== Border crossing ===
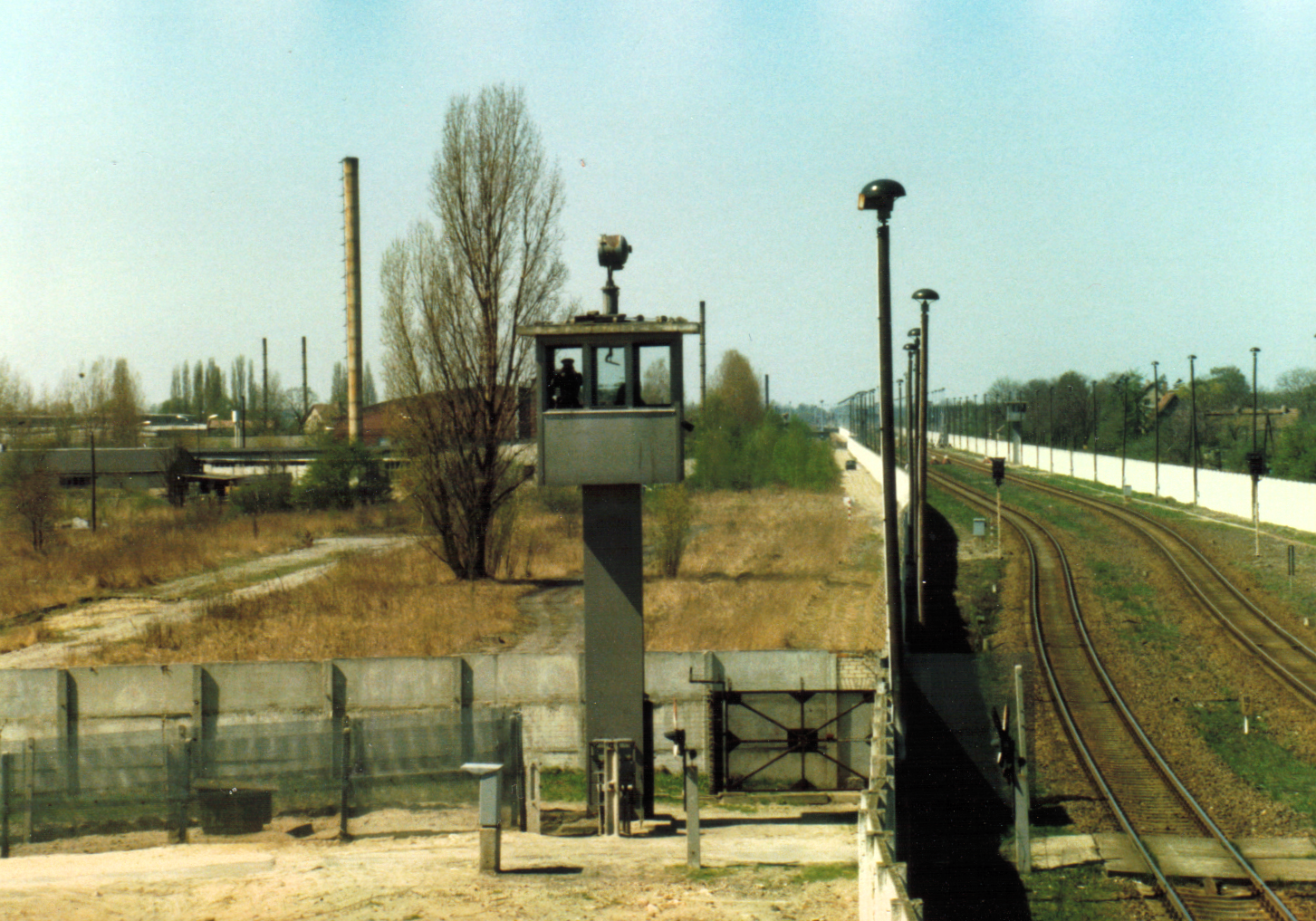
Railroad border crossing, 1986

Albrechtshof station had been the site of a rail border crossing, it was closed in 1961 after an East German train driver, Harry Deterling, fled from the GDR by breaking through the barriers towards the Gartenstadt Staaken in West Berlin with a whole train. The event was dramatised in the 1963 West German film Durchbruch Lok 234 (The Breakthrough). The route to Albrechtshof was only reconnected in 1995 after German reunification.

In 1976 the GDR opened a separate rail border crossing station Staaken for rail transit to western Germany farther away from the border to West Berlin. Up to 1980 the eastern part of Staaken inside West Berlin was served by S-Bahn. This service was abandoned by the East German Reichsbahn Headquarters after the big strike of the West Berlin Reichsbahn workers. A reconnection today is highly unlikely.

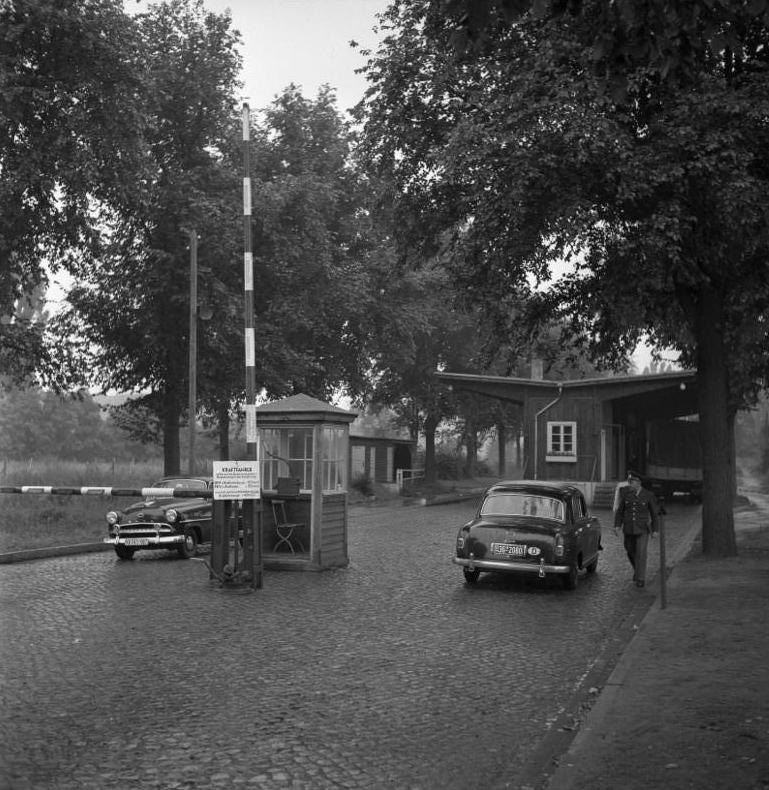
Heerstrasse border crossing in 1955, an Opel vehicle heading east to West Berlin and a Mercedes heading west into East Germany

The car traffic, travelling along F 5 between West Berlin and the East German Democratic Republic or the West German Federal Republic, e.g. to Hamburg, was subject to the Interzonal traffic regulations that between West Germany and West Berlin followed the special regulations of the Transit Agreement (1972).

On 1 January 1988 the transit traffic to West Berlin was redirected to the new East German Stolpe checkpoint (a part of today's Hohen Neuendorf)/West Berlin-Heiligensee. From 1988 to 9 November 1989 the Heerstraße border crossing was open for the highly restricted traffic between West Berlin and East Germany. Highly restricted in this case means citizens of West Berlin had to apply for a visiting permit to visit relatives; while only GDR citizens above the age of 65 could apply to visit relatives in West Berlin. Eastern controls were slowly eased into spot checks and finally abolished on 30 June 1990, the day East and West introduced the union concerning currency, economy and social security (German: Währungs-, Wirtschafts- und Sozialunion).

== Geography ==
Staaken borders on the localities of Spandau proper, Falkenhagener Feld and Wilhelmstadt. In the west it shares border with the Brandenburg municipalities of Falkensee and Dallgow-Döberitz with the village of Seeburg, part of Havelland district. Buildings range from small detached houses and a garden city around the historic village centre in the west to larger 1960s and 1970s housing estates in the east.

=== Subdivisions ===
The locality of Staaken includes six sites (German: Ortslagen) or neighbourhoods (Siedlungen):

- Dorf Staaken ("Staaken Village"), the historic settlement around the Alt-Staaken village church
- Albrechtshof, a family home colony in the northwest, around Berlin Albrechtshof station
- Gartenstadt Staaken (Staaken Garden City), built from 1914 to 1917 according to plans designed by Paul Schmitthenner, today protected as a historic monument
- Neu-Jerusalem, an early example of New Objectivity residential construction along western Heerstraße, erected in 1923/24 according to plans by Erwin Anton Gutkind and Leberecht Migge
- Neu-Staaken with Louise-Schroeder-Siedlung, several housing estates built in the 1960s and 70s on former allotment land in the east which then belonged to West Berlin
- Siedlung Hahneberg, a family home estate in the southwest.

=== Transportation ===
Staaken is served by RegionalExpress and RegionalBahn trains of the Deutsche Bahn at the stations Staaken and Albrechtshof. A S-Bahn connection to Albrechtshof is planned. The Bundesstraße 5 federal highway runs through the locality along Heerstraße.

== Notable people ==
- Katarina Witt (born 1965), figure skater, born in the GDR municipality of Staaken

== Gallery ==
Staaken Garden City

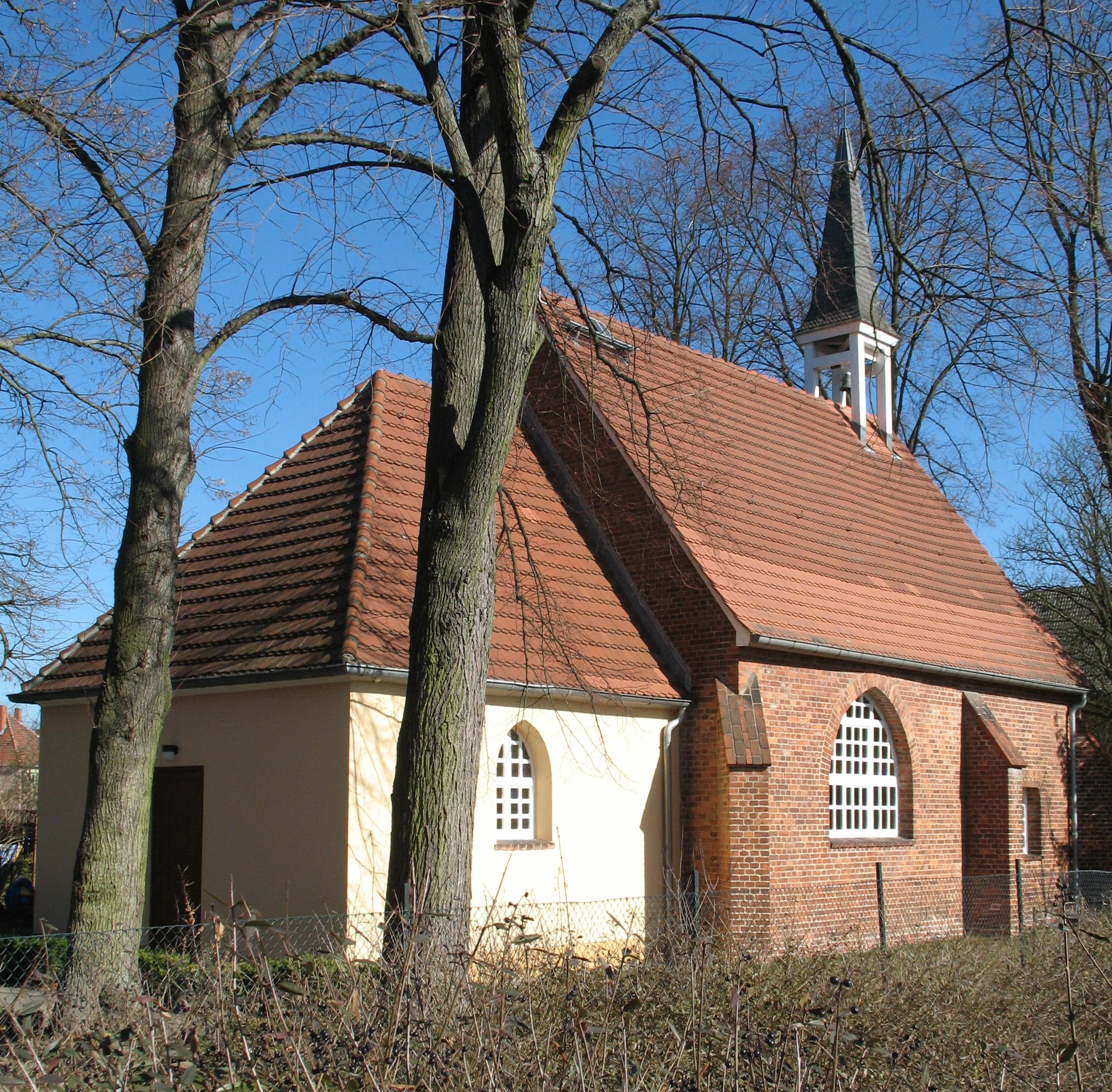
Garden City Church

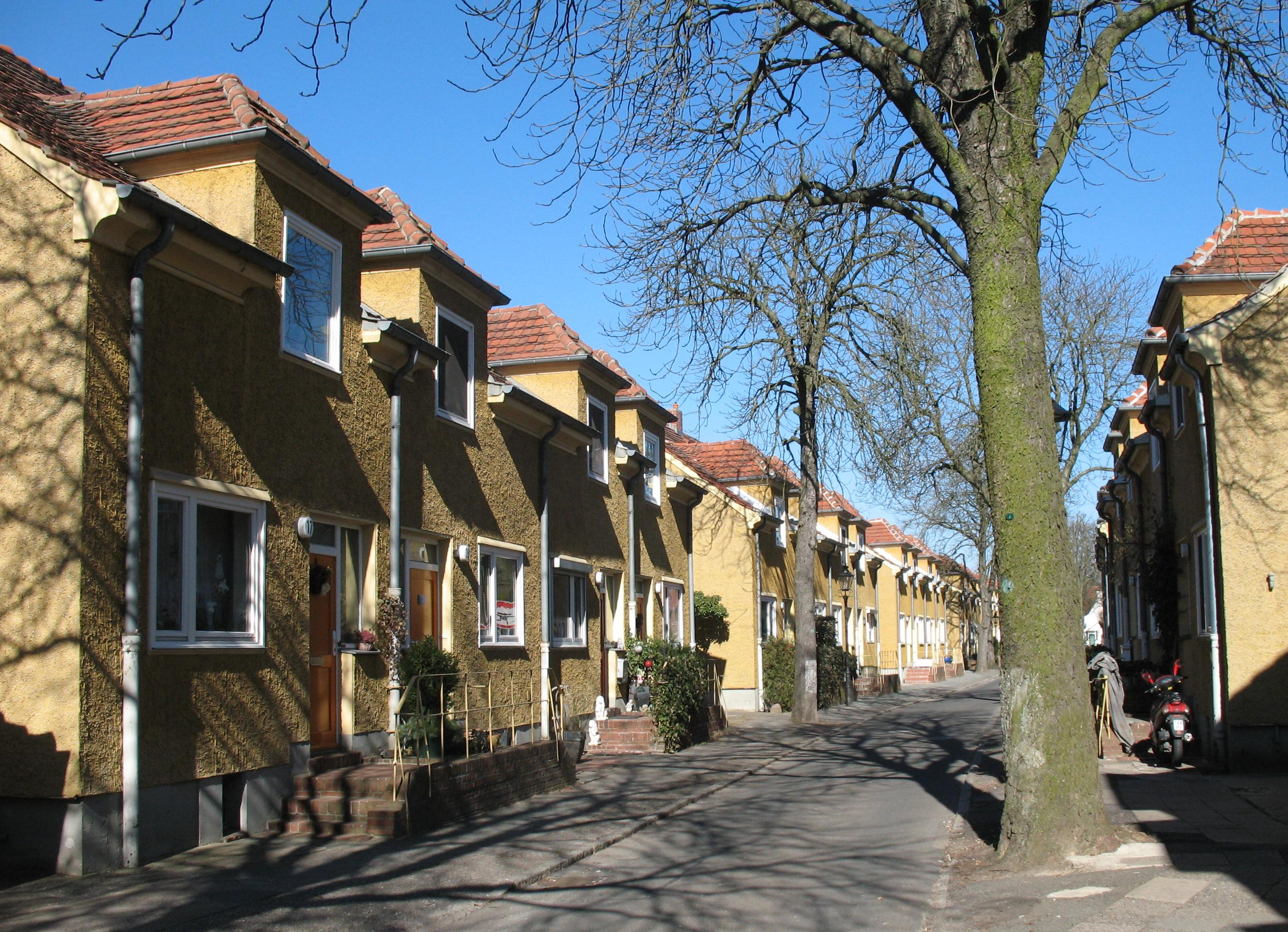
Beim Pfarrhof

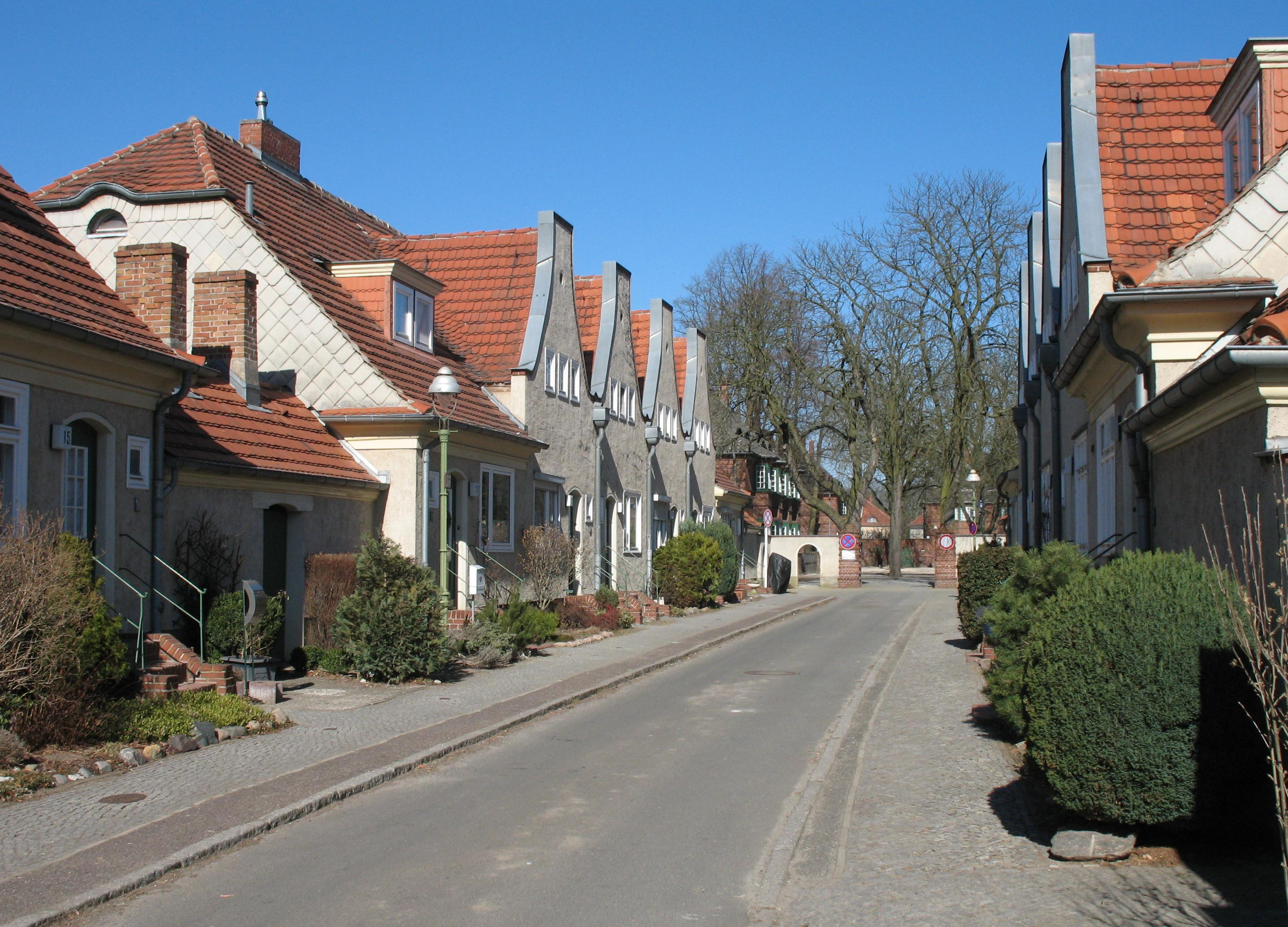
Zwischen den Giebeln

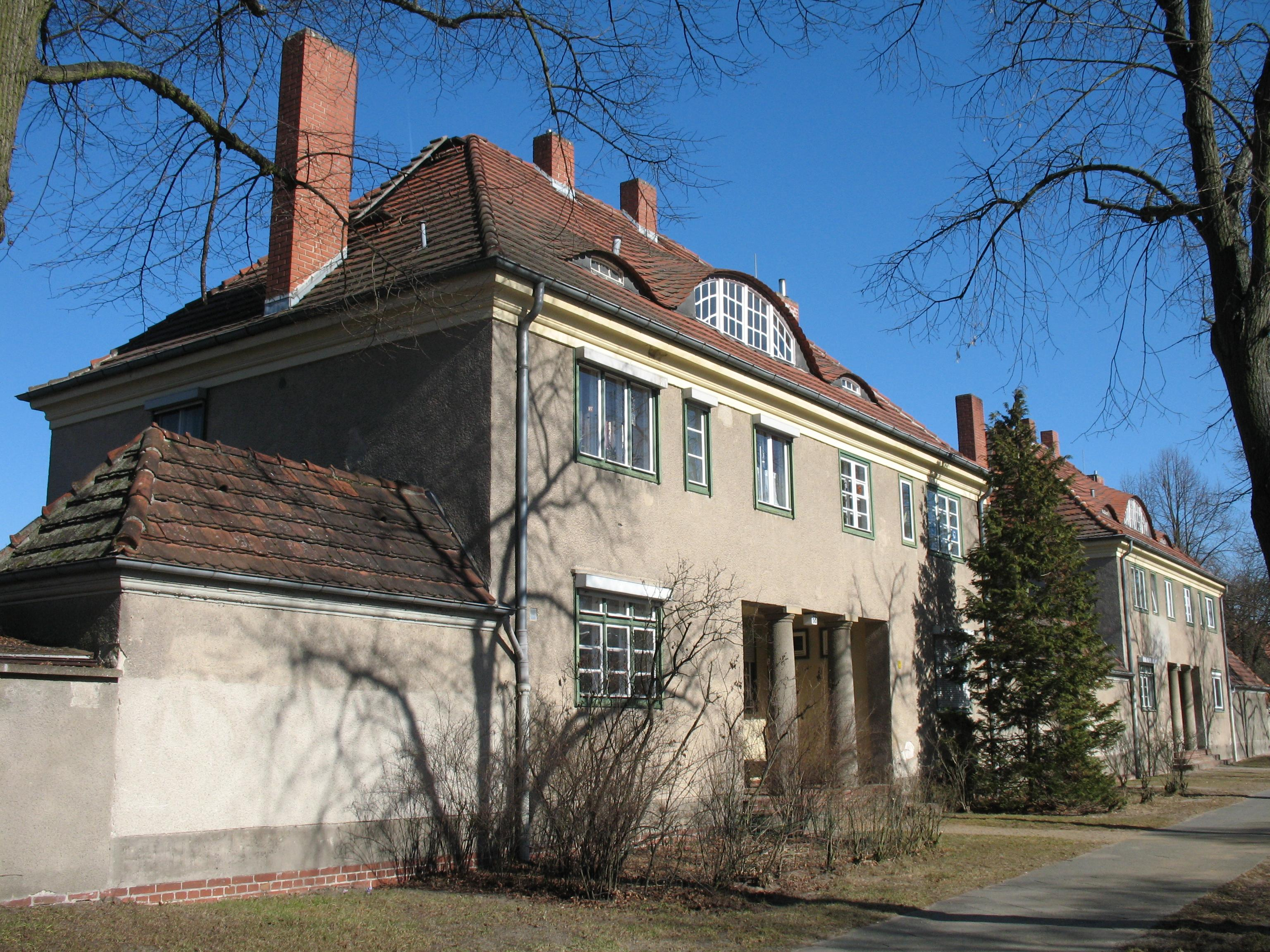
Torweg

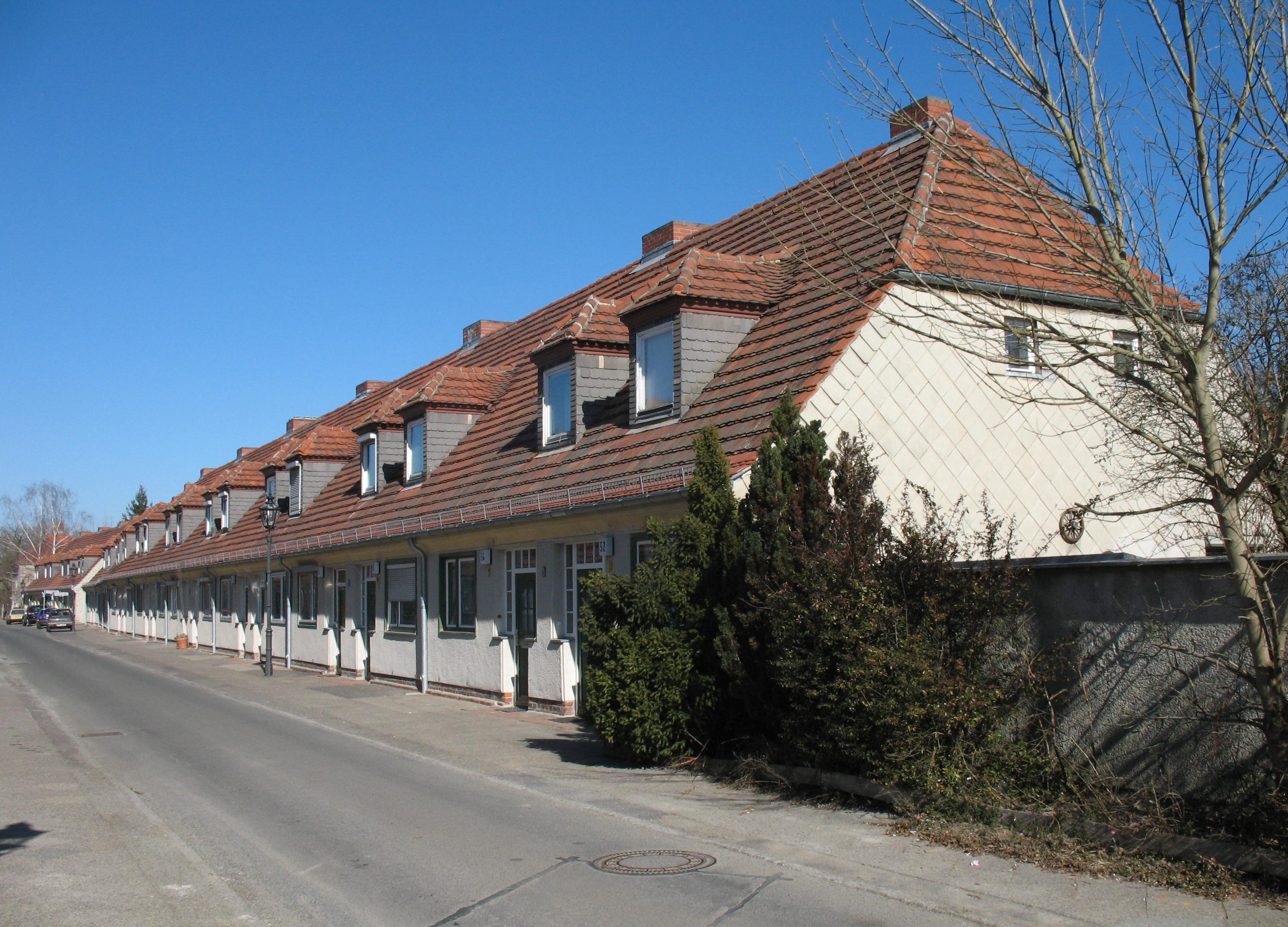
Am langen Weg

== See also ==
- Berlin Albrechtshof railway station
- Berlin-Staaken railway station
- Challenge 1930
- Challenge 1932
- Bullengraben
