= Theodor Fischer =

German architect

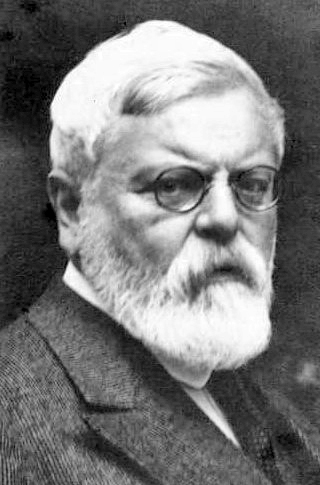
- Theodor Fischer 1933
- Born: 28 May 1862; Schweinfurt, Kingdom of Bavaria
- Died: 25 December 1938 (aged 76); Munich, Germany
- Occupation: Architect

Theodor Fischer (28 May 1862 – 25 December 1938) was a German architect and teacher.

== Career ==
Fischer planned public housing projects for the city of Munich beginning in 1893. He was the joint founder and first chairman of the Deutscher Werkbund (German work federation, 1907), as well as member of the German version of the garden city movement. In 1909, Fischer accepted a position as professor for architecture at the Technical University of Munich.

== Notable pupils ==
Famous pupils of Fischer include Paul Bonatz, Hugo Häring, Ernst May, Erich Mendelsohn, JJP Oud, Bruno Taut, German Bestelmeyer and Paul Schmitthenner.

== Style ==
Originally an imitator of historical styles, he changed direction, seeking a style which was closer to German tradition; his rediscovery of the expressive qualities of stone influenced many of his pupils, and his search for a more genuinely volkisch style explains his nationalist utterances in the early part of the Third Reich. Fischer described his own style as something between historicism and Art Nouveau. He tried to always work in the local context, and the socio-cultural character of the region, with an eye toward the social effect of his plans.

== The German garden city ==
Fischer's work and teaching inspired a number of medieval style garden cities in Germany. These include the 1906 Hellerau settlement and the Falkenberg quarter constructed between 1913 and 1914. The garden city movement in Germany planned suburban housing estates, rather than self-contained greenbelt towns. In the 1920s garden cities were considered essential in Germanic urban planning.
