= Neu-Jerusalem =

Residential complex in Berlin

Coordinates: 52°31′40.8″N 13°7′33.7″E

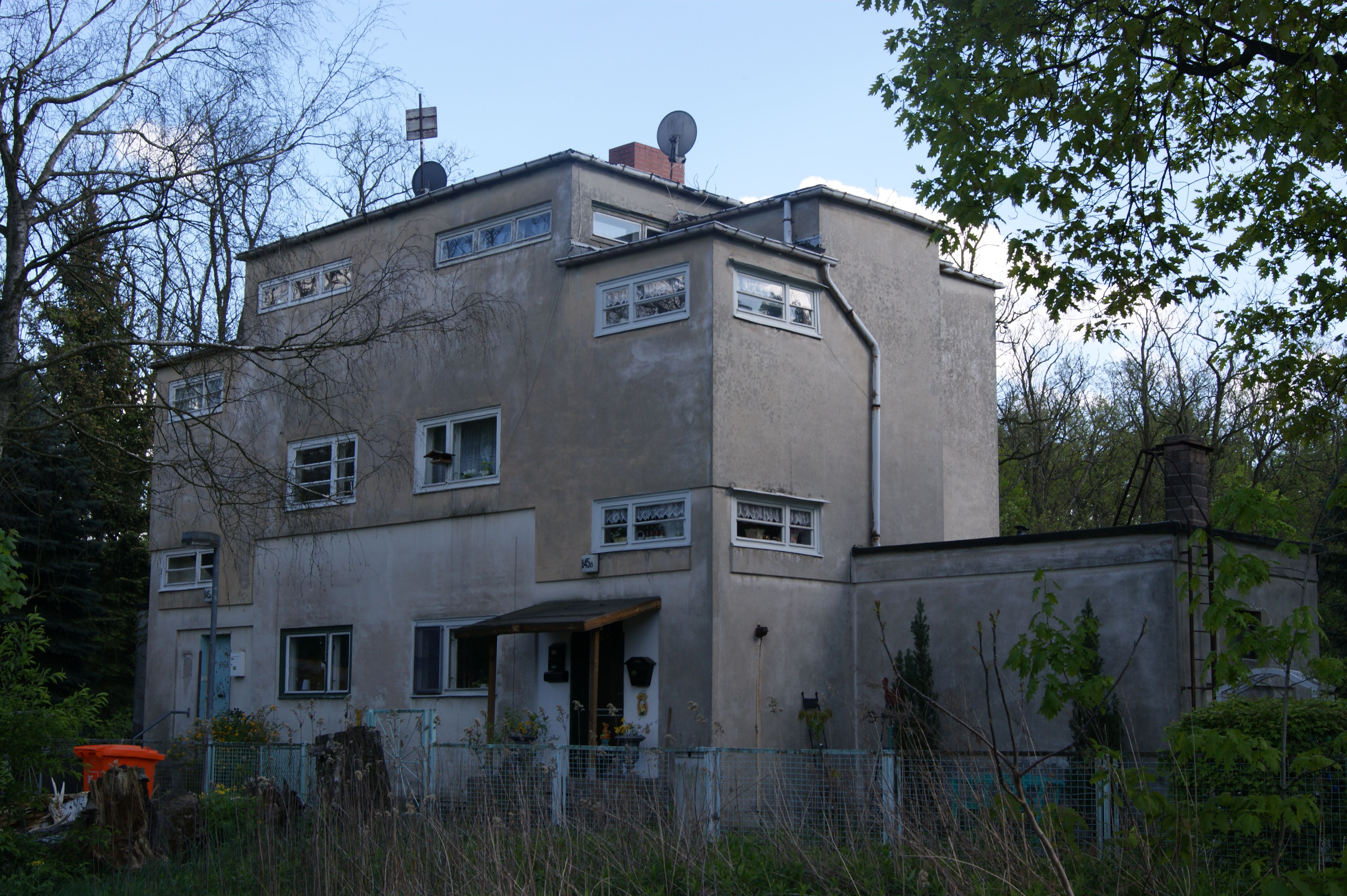
Semi-detached houses 645a and 645b, Heerstraße

The Siedlung Neu-Jerusalem (New Jerusalem settlement) is a residential complex along federal route No. 5, here named Heerstraße, in the locality of Staaken, part of Berlin's Borough of Spandau. The Deutsche Gartenstadt Gesellschaft commissioned Erwin Gutkind (in German), who designed between 1923 and 1924 following the style of New Objectivity the plans for the complex, which was completed until 1925.

== Overview ==
The complex, close to the border between the federal states of Berlin and Brandenburg, was erected for employees of the zeppelin airfield in Staaken, where Deutsche Luft Hansa ran an aviation academy (German: Fliegerakademie) for flight training and premises for maintenance purposes.

The complex consists of 21 semi-detached houses of equal design and one single house. The cubic buildings with their one-storied annexes earn the complex, aligned along Heerstraße, an appearance of one accord. The gardens are parcelled and imbedded in the cubic forms of the settlement.

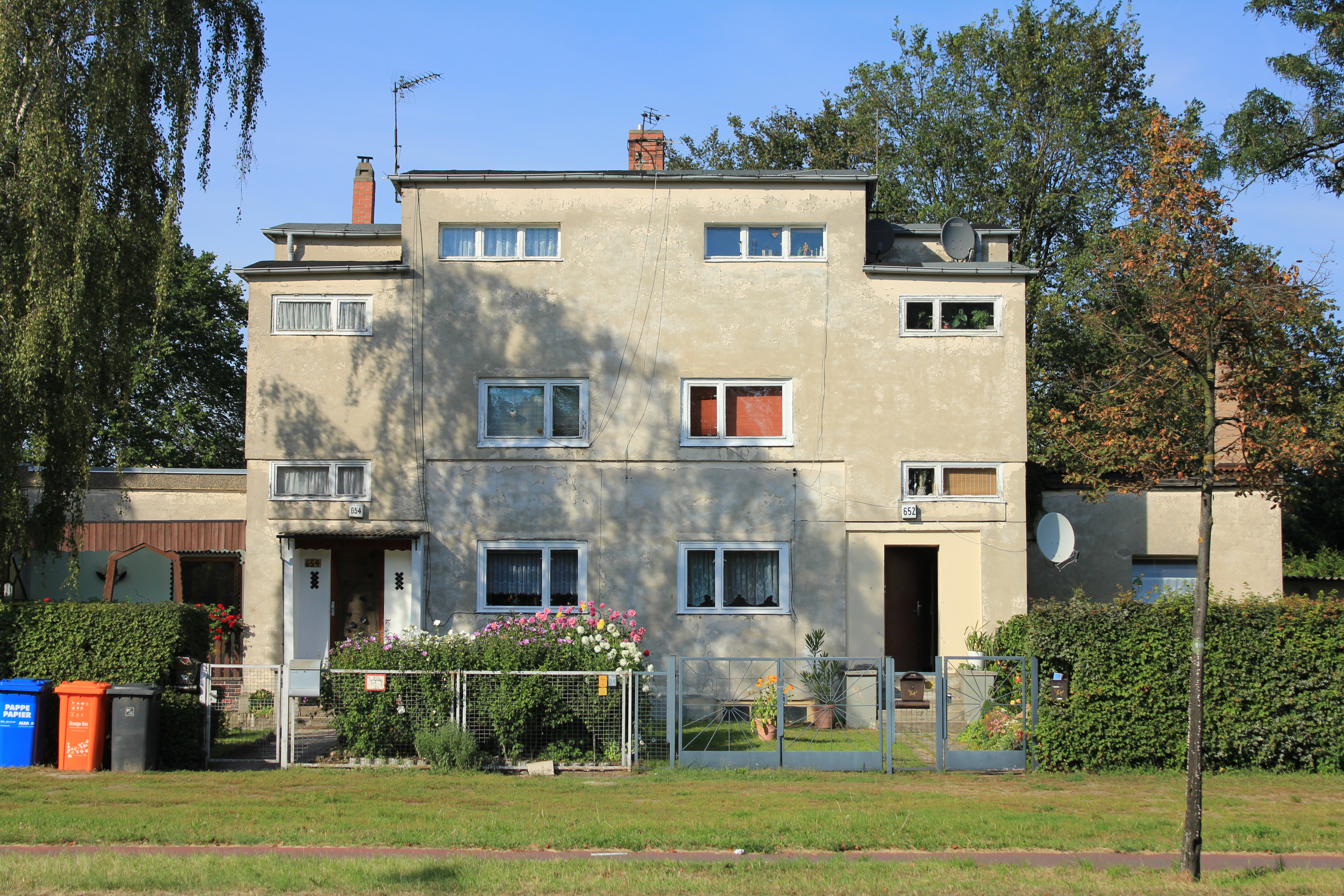
Semi-detached houses 652a and 652b, Heerstraße

The cubic design and alternating scaling of each building makes them typical examples of early 20th architectural Avant-garde. Impressive is the horizontal structuring of the façades, covered with white plaster below and showing dark reddish brick masonry above, only partly preserved.

As opposed to the semi-detached houses the detached house had been constructed by way of the then still experimental method of prefabricated building.

The complex is listed as a monument.

== Sources ==
- Rudolf Hierl, Erwin Gutkind (1886–1968), Basel: Birkhäuser Verlag, 1992, ISBN 3-7643-2689-1
- Reihenhäuser, Peter Güttler (ed.), Berlin: Ernst & Sohn, 2002, (Berlin und seine Bauten; part 4, vol. D). ISBN 3-433-01017-X
