= Paul Schmitthenner =

German architect, city planner and professor (1884–1972)

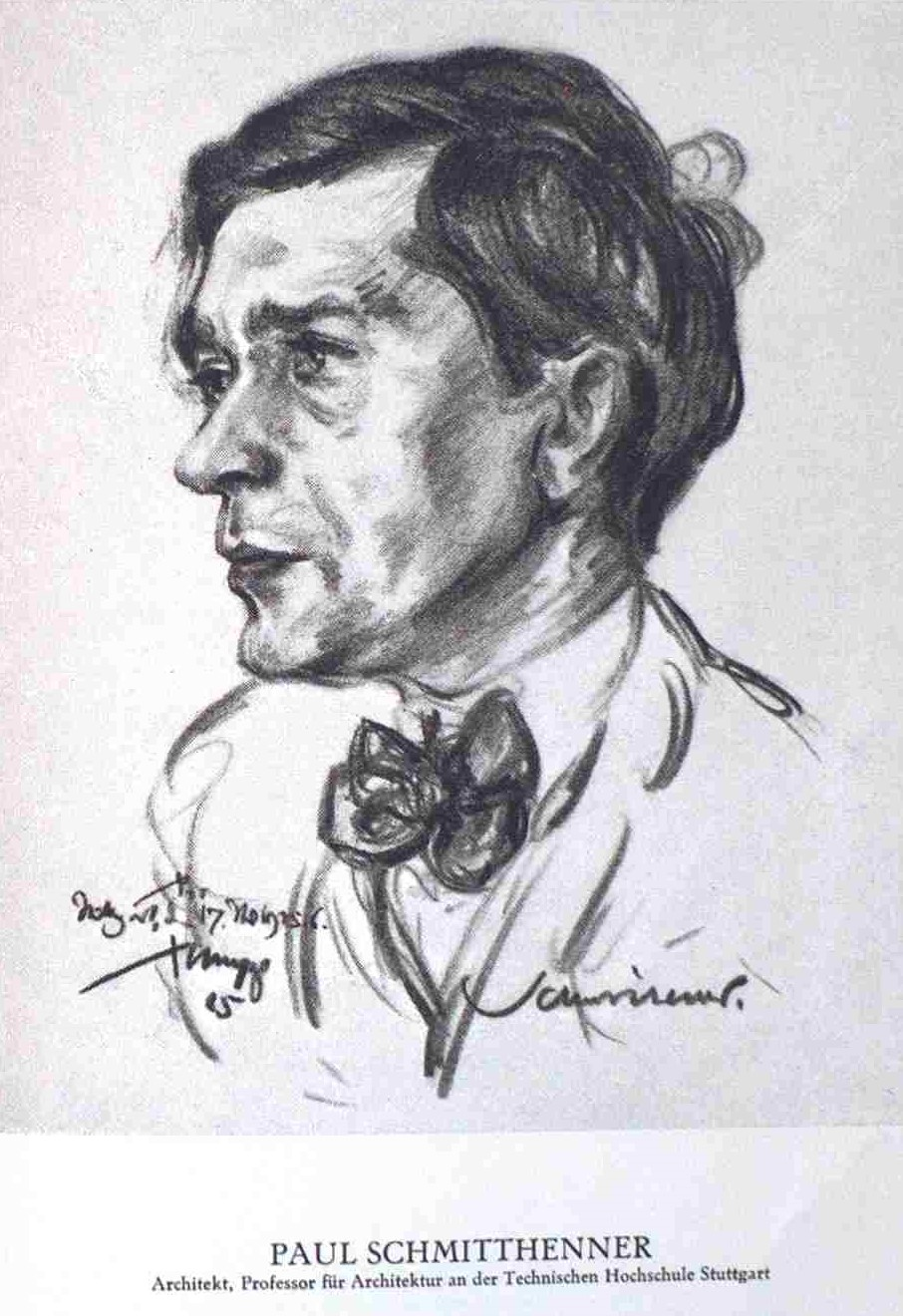
- Born: 15 December 1884; Lauterburg, Elsass-Lothringen, German Empire
- Died: 11 November 1972 (aged 87); Munich, West Germany
- Education: Karlsruhe Institute of Technology, University of Stuttgart, Technical University of Munich
- Occupation: Architect
- Spouse(s): Marie Charlotte, geb. Schütz, Elisabeth Prüß
- Children: Martin, Hansjörg, Barbara, Johannes

Paul Schmitthenner (born Lauterburg, Elsass-Lothringen, Germany 15 December 1884 – 11 November 1972) was a German architect, city planner and Professor at the University of Stuttgart.

During Nazi Germany, Schmitthenner was one of Adolf Hitler's architects.

== Early life and education ==
He studied at the Technische Hochschulen of Karlsruhe and Munich and later became a Professor at the University of Stuttgart, where he formed together with Paul Bonatz the architectural style of the Stuttgart School.

== Architecture ==
His belief that the traditional methods and styles in architecture revealed best the German character led to his appointment as expert group leader for fine arts in the Kampfbund. He believed that Schönheit ruht in Ordnung (German: "Beauty lies in (geometric) order"). Schmitthenner was in open opposition to modern architects like Walter Gropius. For him, Goethe's cottage at Weimar was still the ideal type of the German residential building. However, despite official approval, his enthusiasm did not bring many large commissions.

=== World War II ===
In 1935, Nazi propaganda minister Joseph Goebbels decreed that war memorials were not to list the names of Jewish soldiers. However, this decree went largely unenforced. In 1938, Schmitthenner, the rector at Stuttgart, wrote to the Baden Ministry of Culture that it was "intolerable that names of members of the Jewish race remain on plaques of the war dead ... I consider the removal of the Jewish names necessary." It was forwarded to Hitler, who decreed that Jewish names on existing memorials and plaques would not be removed.

=== Later life ===
Schmitthenner's son Martin was killed during World War II in France. Schitthenner's home, built in 1922 and known as the 'Noah's Ark over Stuttgart', was destroyed in a bombing raid in 1944.

He had to leave his chair at the University after the war without a pension and worked as an architect till the end of his life. In Stuttgart, he built the "Königin-Olga-Bau" for the Dresdner Bank in 1950.

== Works ==
Baugestaltung. Das Deutsche Wohnhaus, 1932.

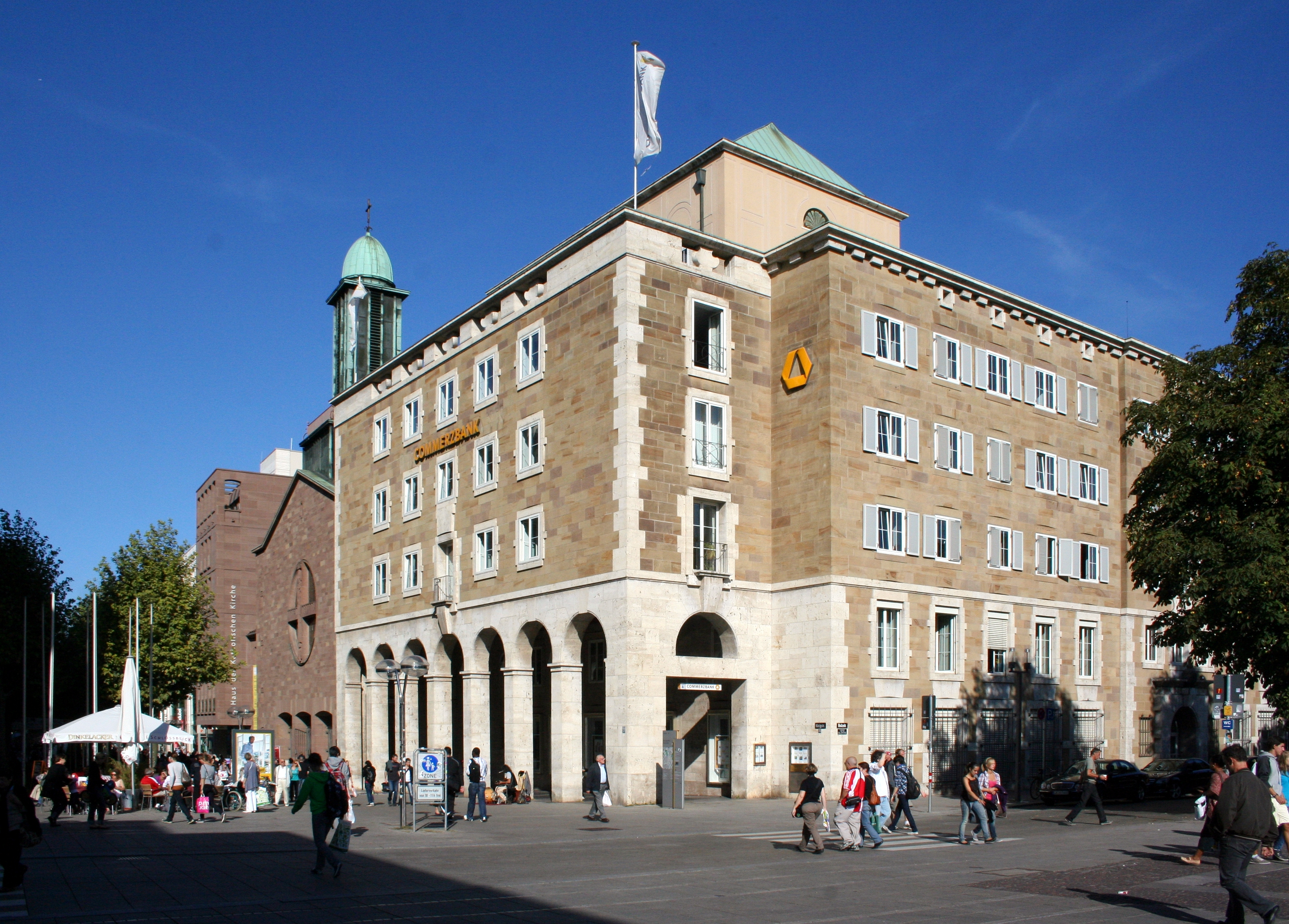
Königin-Olga-Bau in Stuttgart

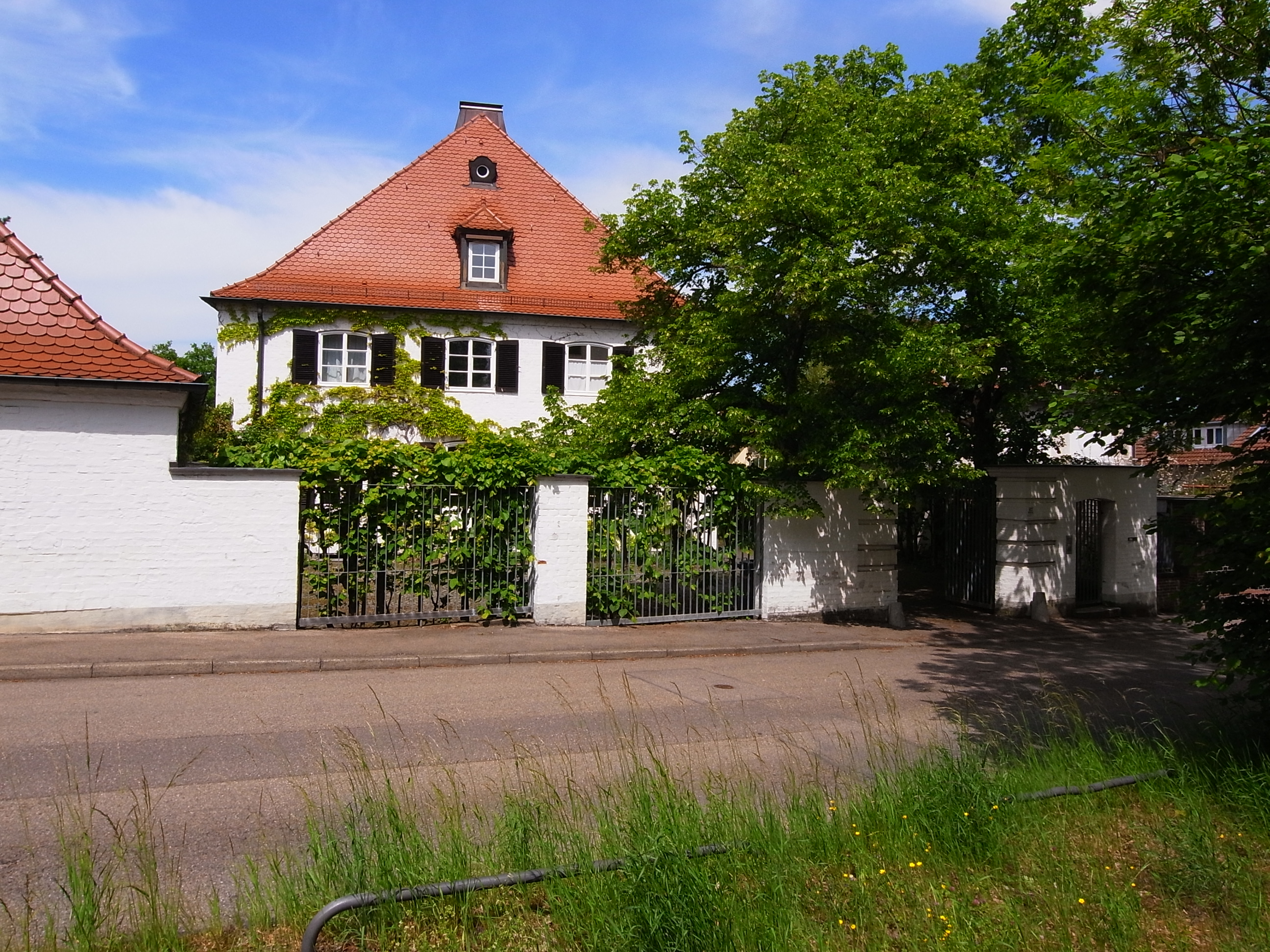
Villa Zerweck in the Feuerbacher Heide

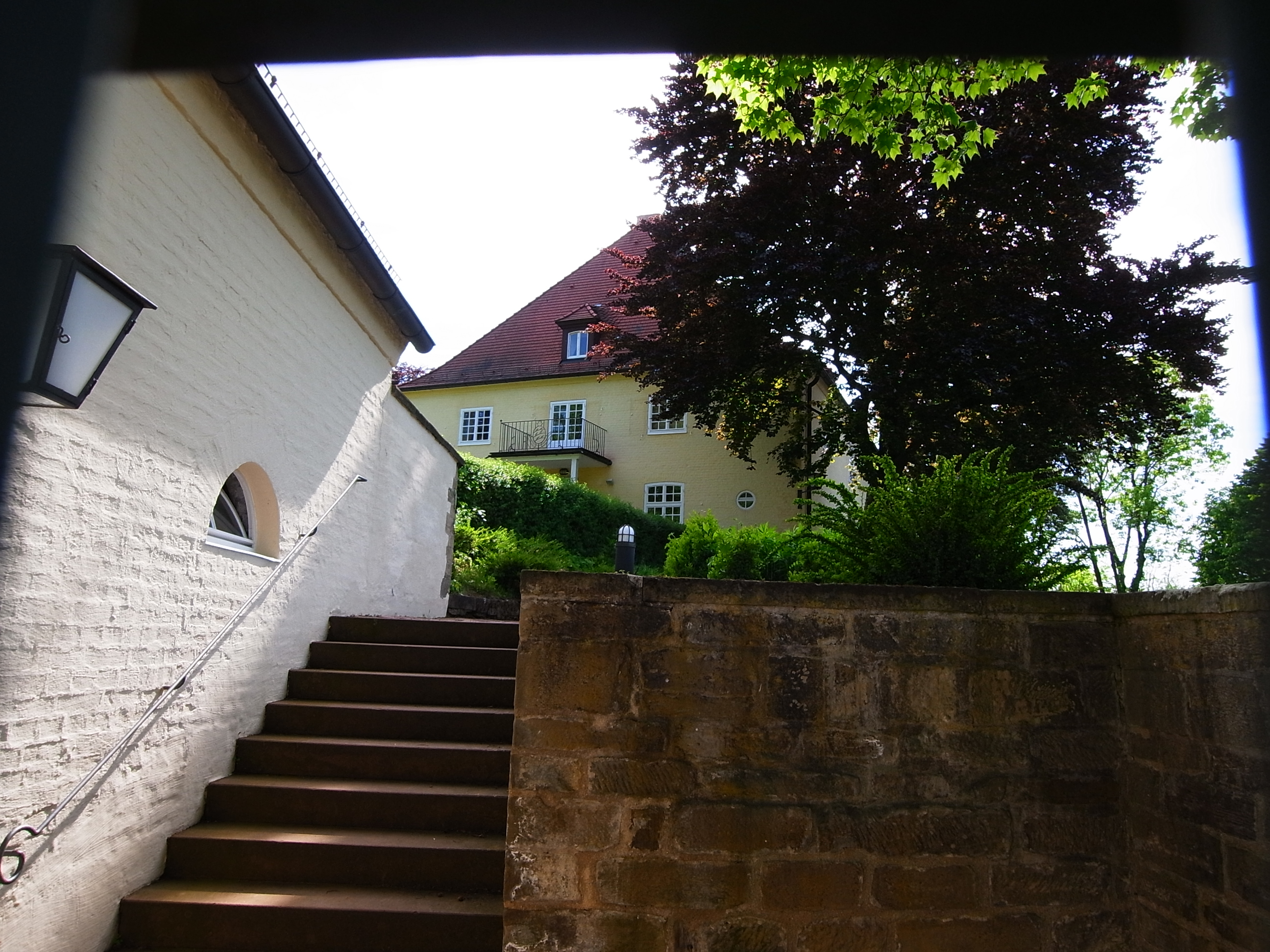
The villa for the Roser family of factory owners (Villa Roser)

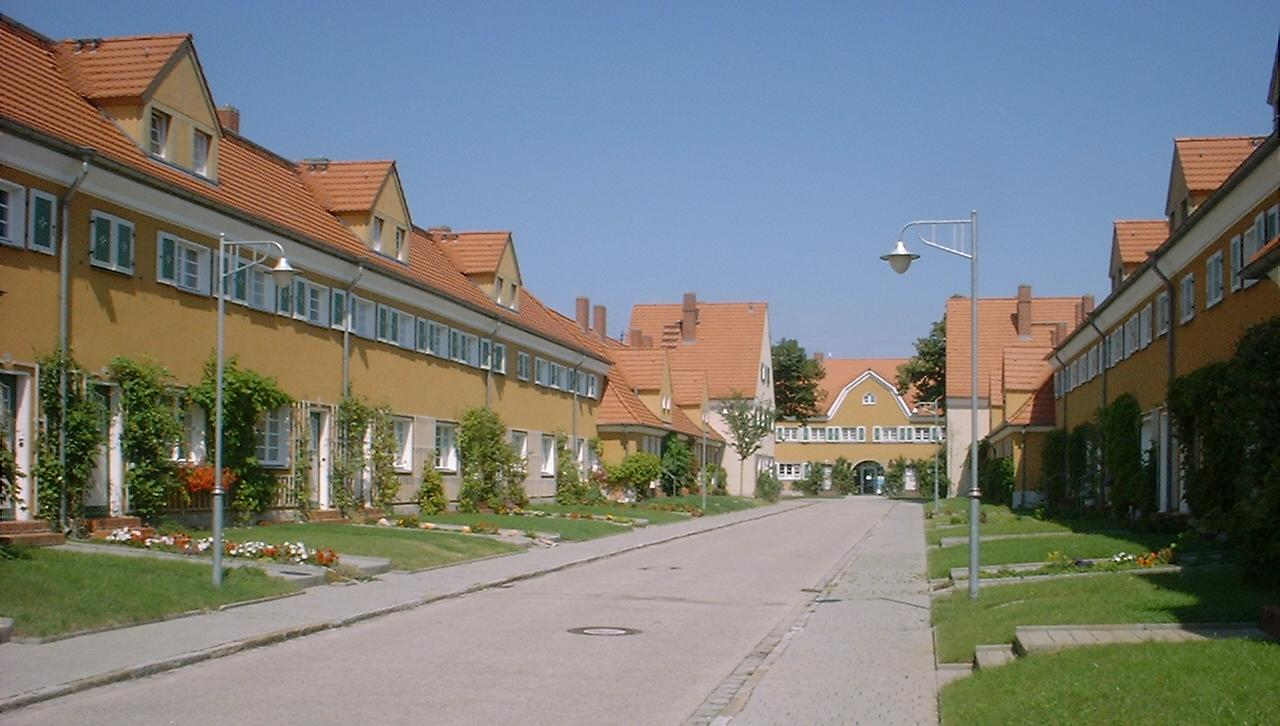
Works housing estate Piesteritz

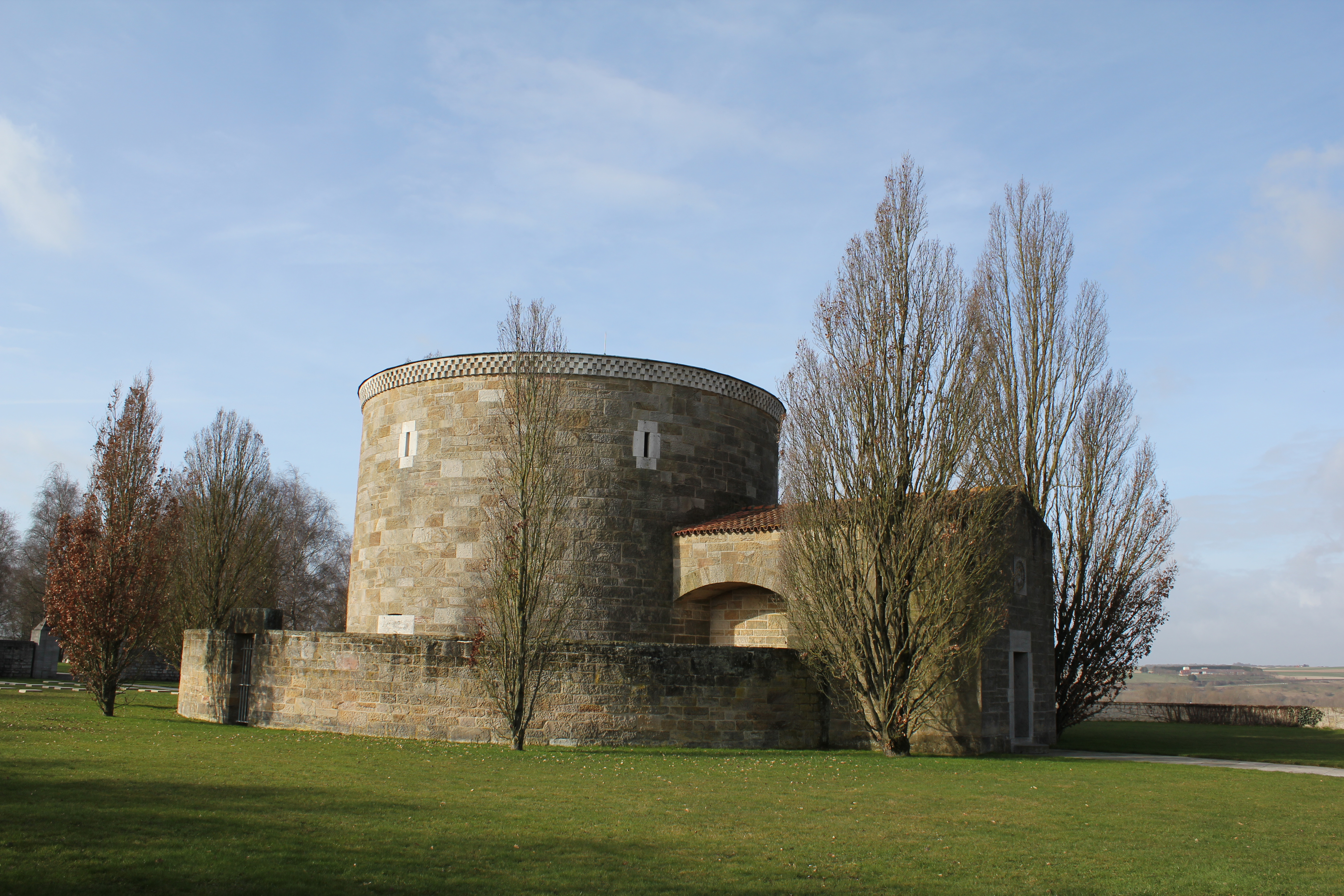
Main building of the Bourdon German war cemetery

== See also ==
- Nazi architecture
