= Expressionist architecture =

Architectural style

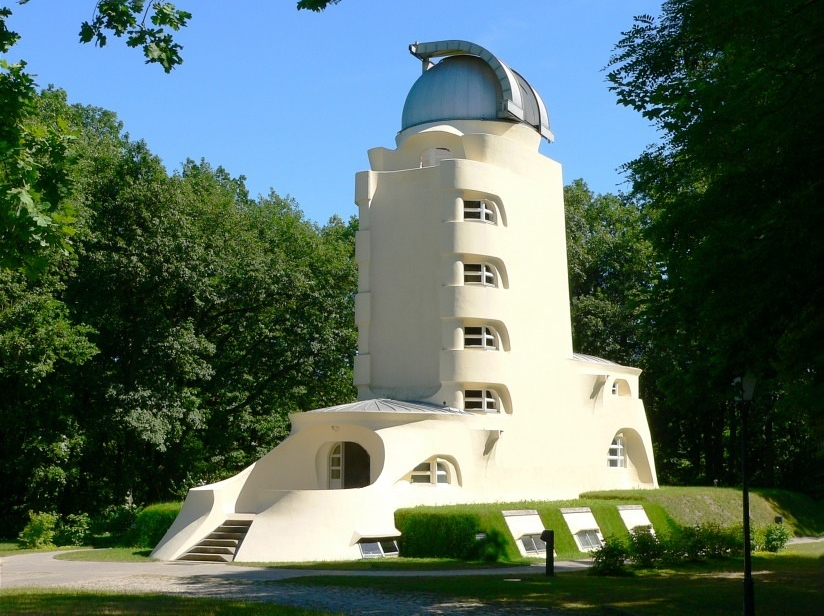
Einstein Tower in Potsdam near Berlin, 1919–1922 (Erich Mendelsohn)

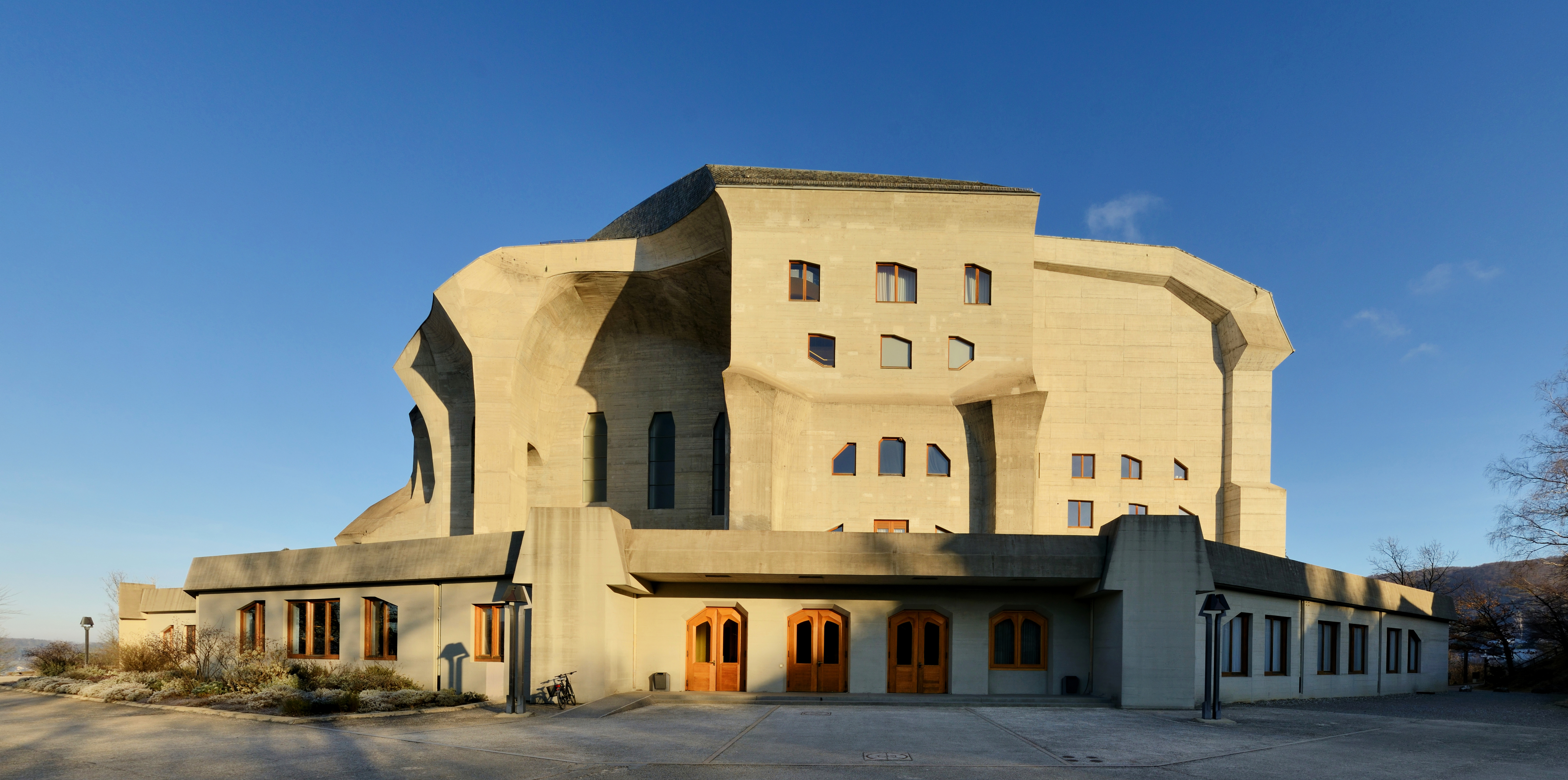
Goetheanum in Dornach near Basel Switzerland, 1924–28 (Rudolf Steiner)

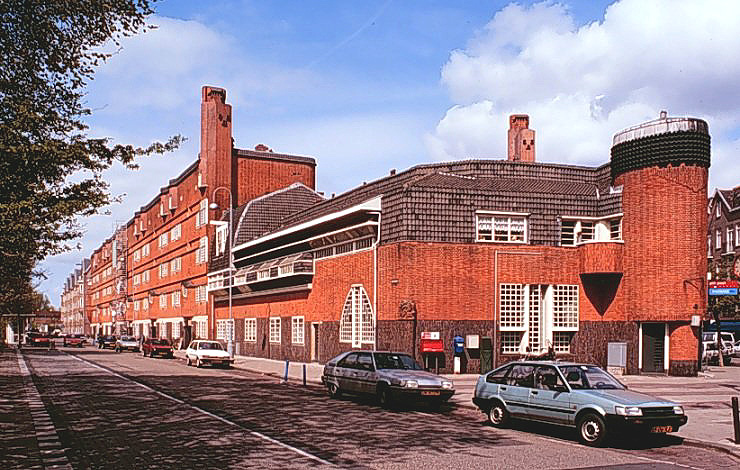
Dutch expressionism (Amsterdam School), Het Schip apartment building in Amsterdam, 1917–20 (Michel de Klerk)

Expressionist architecture was an architectural movement in Europe during the first decades of the 20th century in parallel with the expressionist visual and performing arts that especially developed and dominated in Germany. Brick Expressionism is a special variant of this movement in western and northern Germany, as well as in the Netherlands (where it is known as the Amsterdam School).

== In the 1920s ==
The term "Expressionist architecture" initially described the activity of the German, Dutch, Austrian, Czech and Danish avant garde from 1910 until 1930. Subsequent redefinitions extended the term backwards to 1905 and also widened it to encompass the rest of Europe. Today the meaning has broadened even further to refer to architecture of any date or location that exhibits some of the qualities of the original movement such as; distortion, fragmentation or the communication of violent or overstressed emotion.

The style was characterised by an early-modernist adoption of novel materials, formal innovation, and very unusual massing, sometimes inspired by natural biomorphic forms, sometimes by the new technical possibilities offered by the mass production of brick, steel, and especially glass. Many expressionist architects fought in World War I and their experiences, combined with the political turmoil and social upheaval that followed the German Revolution of 1919, resulted in a utopian outlook and a romantic socialist agenda. Economic conditions severely limited the number of built commissions between 1914 and the mid-1920s, resulting in many of the most important expressionist works remaining as projects on paper, such as Bruno Taut's Alpine Architecture and Hermann Finsterlin's Formspiels. Ephemeral exhibition buildings were numerous and highly significant during this period. Scenography for theatre and films provided another outlet for the expressionist imagination, and provided supplemental incomes for designers attempting to challenge conventions in a harsh economicate.

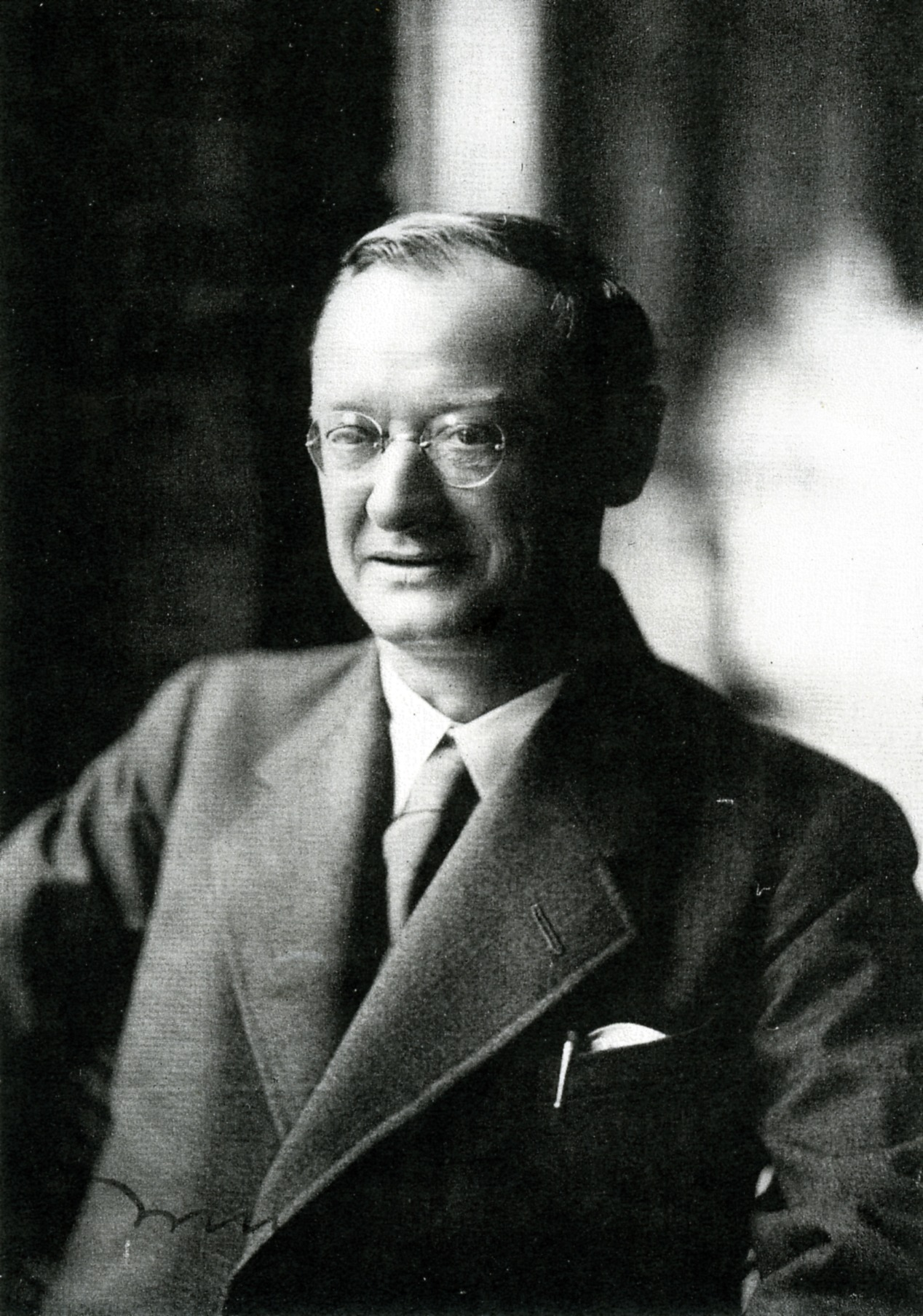
Bruno Taut (1910)

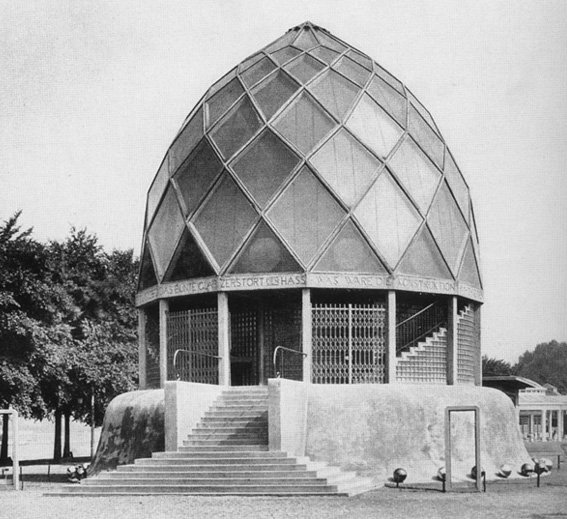
Glass Pavilion at the Cologne Deutscher Werkbund Exhibition, 1914 (Bruno Taut)

Important events in Expressionist architecture include; the Werkbund Exhibition (1914) in Cologne, the completion and theatrical running of the Großes Schauspielhaus, Berlin in 1919, the Glass Chain letters, and the activities of the Amsterdam School. The major permanent extant landmark of Expressionism is Erich Mendelsohn's Einstein Tower in Potsdam. By 1925, most of the leading architects such as Bruno Taut, Erich Mendelsohn, Walter Gropius, Mies van der Rohe and Hans Poelzig, along with other expressionists in the visual arts, had turned toward the Neue Sachlichkeit (New Objectivity) movement, a more practical and matter-of-fact approach which rejected the emotional agitation of expressionism. A few, notably Hans Scharoun, continued to work in an expressionist idiom.

In 1933, after the Nazi seizure of power in Germany, expressionist art was outlawed as degenerate. Until the 1970s scholars (Most notably Nikolaus Pevsner) commonly played down the influence of the expressionists on the later International Style, but this has been re-evaluated in recent years.

== Characteristics ==
Expressionist architecture was individualistic and in many ways eschewed aesthetic dogma, but it is still useful to develop some criteria which defines it. Though containing a great variety and differentiation, many points can be found as recurring in works of Expressionist architecture, and are evident in some degree in each of its works:

1. Distortion of form for an emotional effect.
2. Subordination of realism to symbolic or stylistic expression of inner experience.
3. An underlying effort at achieving the new, original, and visionary
4. Profusion of works on paper, and models, with discovery and representations of concepts more important than pragmatic finished products.
5. Often hybrid solutions, irreducible to a single concept.
6. Themes of natural romantic phenomena, such as caves, mountains, lightning, crystal and rock formations. As such it is more mineral and elemental than florid and organic which characterized its close contemporary Art Nouveau.
7. Uses creative potential of artisan craftsmanship.
8. Tendency more towards the Gothic than the Classical architecture. Expressionist architecture also tends more towards the Romanesque and the Rococo than the classical.
9. Though a movement in Europe, expressionism is as eastern as western. It draws as much from Moorish, Islamic, Egyptian, and Indian art and architecture as from Roman or Greek.
10. Conception of architecture as a work of art.

== Context ==
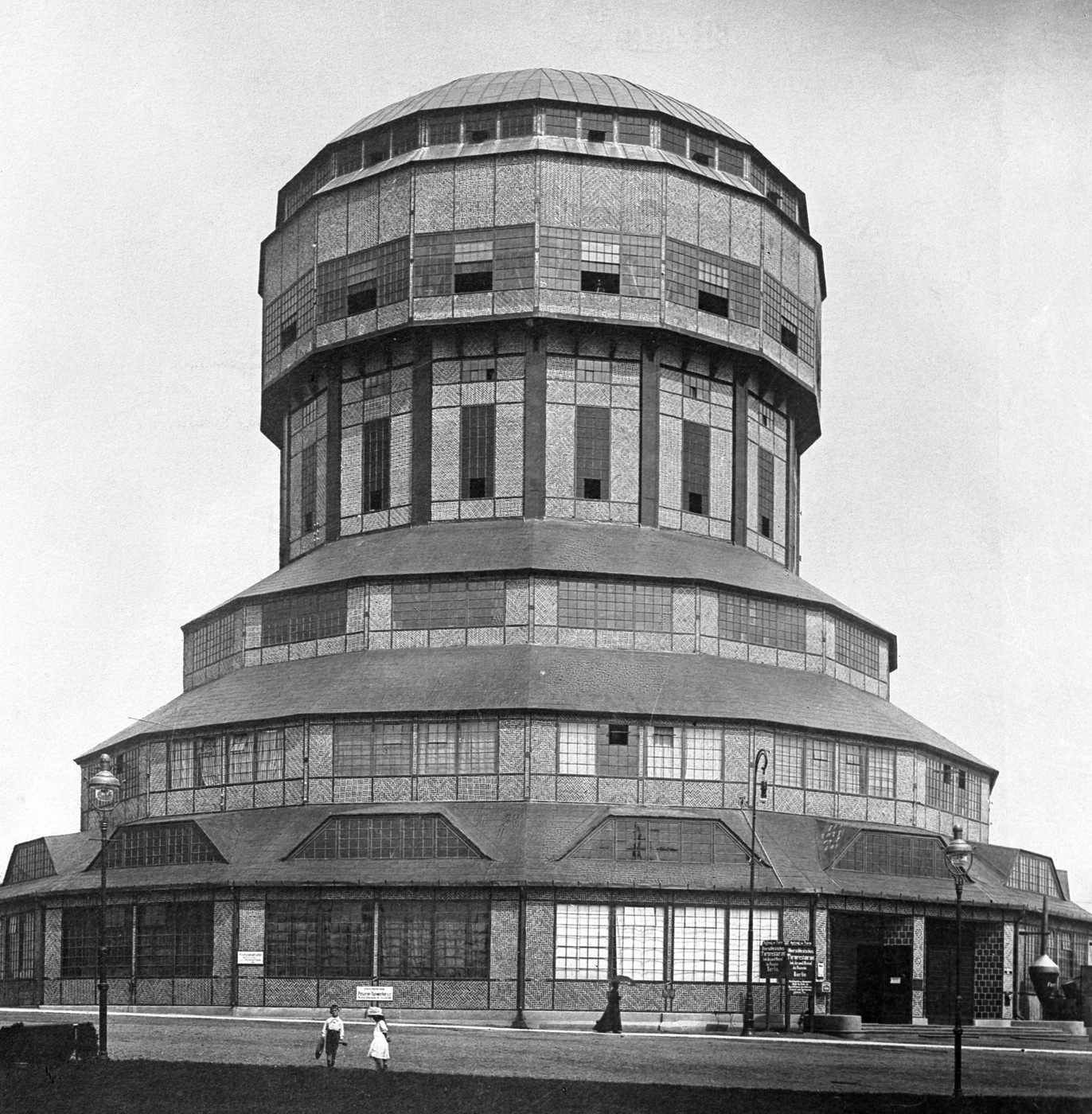
Water tower in Poznań, 1911 (Hans Poelzig)

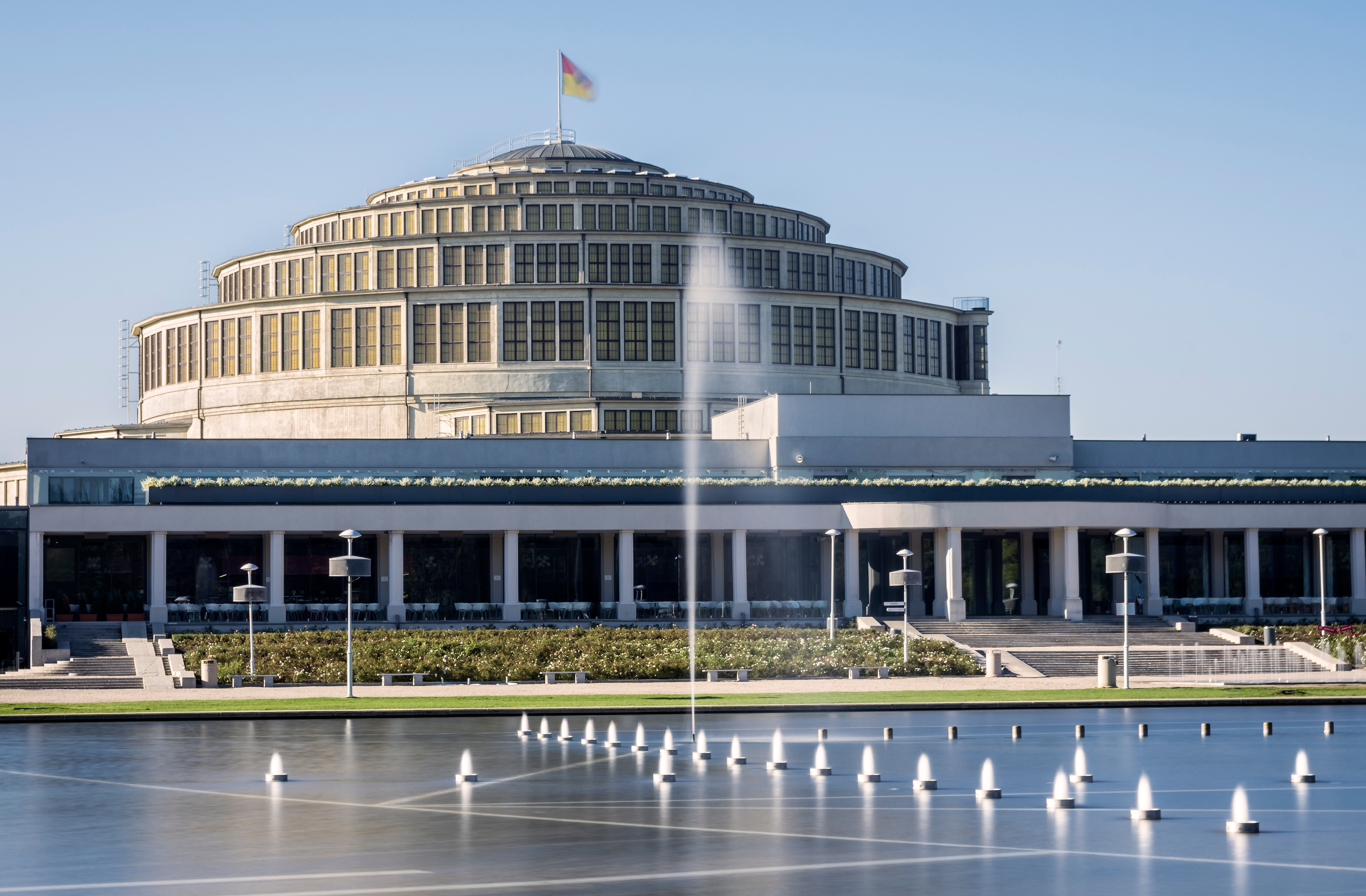
Centennial Hall in Wrocław, Poland, 1911–13 (Max Berg). Early landmark of Expressionist architecture and UNESCO World Heritage Site.

Political, economic and artistic shifts provided a context for the early manifestations of Expressionist architecture; particularly in Germany, where the utopian qualities of Expressionism found strong resonances with a leftist artistic community keen to provide answers to a society in turmoil during and after the events of World War I. The loss of the war, the subsequent removal of Kaiser Wilhelm II, the deprivations and the rise of social democracy and the optimism of the Weimar Republic created a reluctance amongst architects to pursue projects initiated before the war and provided the impetus to seek new solutions. An influential body of the artistic community, including architects, sought a similar revolution as had occurred in Russia. The costly and grandiose remodelling of the Großes Schauspielhaus, was more reminiscent of the imperial past, than wartime budgeting and post-war depression.

Artistic movements that preceded Expressionist architecture and continued with some overlap were the Arts and Crafts movement and Art Nouveau or in Germany, Jugendstil. Unity of designers with artisans, was a major preoccupation of the Arts and Crafts movement which extended into Expressionist architecture. The frequent topic of naturalism in Art Nouveau, which was also prevalent in Romanticism, continued as well, but took a turn for the more earthen than floral. The naturalist Ernst Haeckel was known by Finsterlin and shared his source of inspiration in natural forms.

The Futurist and Constructivist architectural movements, and the Dada anti-art movement were occurring concurrently to Expressionism and often contained similar features. Bruno Taut's magazine, Frülicht included constructivist projects, including Vladimir Tatlins Monument to the Third International. However, Futurism and Constructivism emphasized mechination and urbanism tendencies which were not to take hold in Germany until the Neue Sachlichkeit movement. Erich Mendelsohn is an exception whose work bordered on Futurism and Constructivism. A quality of dynamic energy and exuberance exists in both the sketches of Mendelsohn and futurist Antonio Sant'Elia. The Merzbau by Dada artist Kurt Schwitters, with its angular, abstract form, held many expressionist characteristics.

Influence of individualists such as Frank Lloyd Wright and Antoni Gaudí also provided the surrounding context for Expressionist architecture. Portfolios of Wright were included in the lectures of Erich Mendelsohn and were well known to those in his circle. Gaudí was also both influenced and influencing what was happening in Berlin. In Barcelona, there was no abrupt break between the architecture of Art Nouveau and that of the early 20th century, where Jugendstil was opposed after 1900, and his work contains more of Art Nouveau than that of, say, Bruno Taut. The group Der Ring did know about Gaudí, as he was published in Germany, and Finsterlin was in correspondence. Charles Rennie Mackintosh should also be mentioned in the larger context surrounding Expressionist architecture. Hard to classify as strictly Arts and Crafts or Art Nouveau, buildings such as the Hill House and his Ingram chairs have an expressionist tinge. His work was known on the continent, as it was exhibited at the Vienna Secession exhibition in 1900.

== Underlying ideas ==
Many writers contributed to the ideology of Expressionist architecture. Sources of philosophy important to expressionist architects were works by Friedrich Nietzsche, Søren Kierkegaard, and Henri Bergson. Bruno Taut's sketches were frequently noted with quotations from Nietzsche, particularly Thus Spoke Zarathustra, whose protagonist embodied freedoms dear to the expressionists; freedom to reject the bourgeois world, freedom from history, and strength of spirit in individualist isolation. Zarathustra's mountain retreat was an inspiration to Taut's Alpine Architecture. Henry van de Velde drew a title page illustration for Nietzsche's Ecce Homo. The author Franz Kafka in his The Metamorphosis, with its shape shifting matched the material instability of Expressionist architecture Naturalists such as Charles Darwin, and Ernst Haeckel contributed an ideology for the biomorphic form of architects such as Herman Finsterlin. Poet Paul Scheerbart worked directly with Bruno Taut and his circle, and contributed ideas based on his poetry of glass architecture.

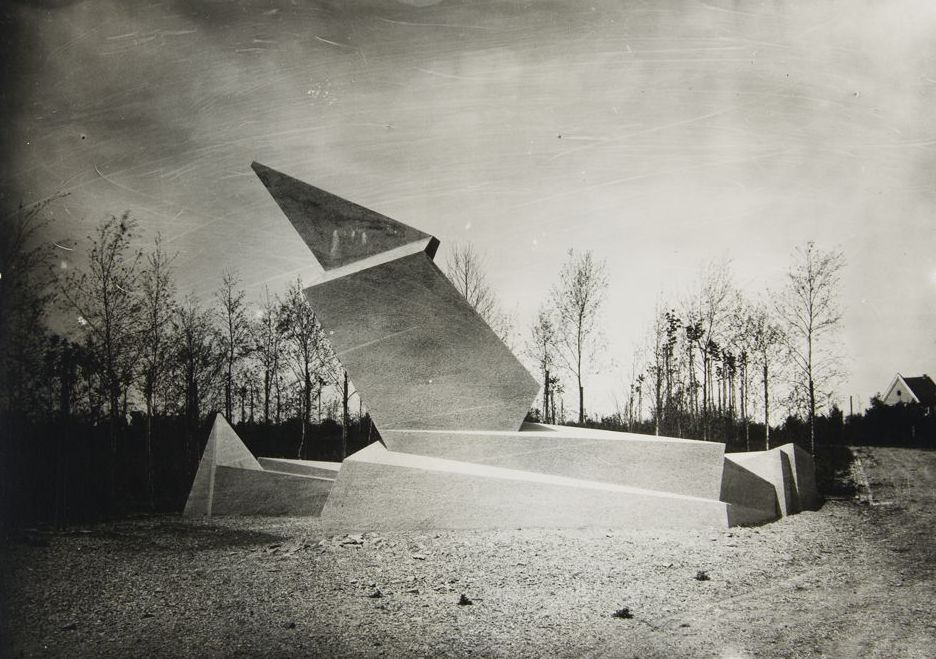
1921, Walter Gropius's "Monument to the March Dead" in Weimar

Emergent psychology from Sigmund Freud and Carl Jung was important to Expressionism. The exploration of psychological effects of form and space was undertaken by architects in their buildings, projects and films. Bruno Taut noted the psychological possibilities of scenographic design that "Objects serve psychologically to mirror the actors' emotions and gestures." The exploration of dreams and the unconscious, provided material for the formal investigations of Hermann Finsterlin.

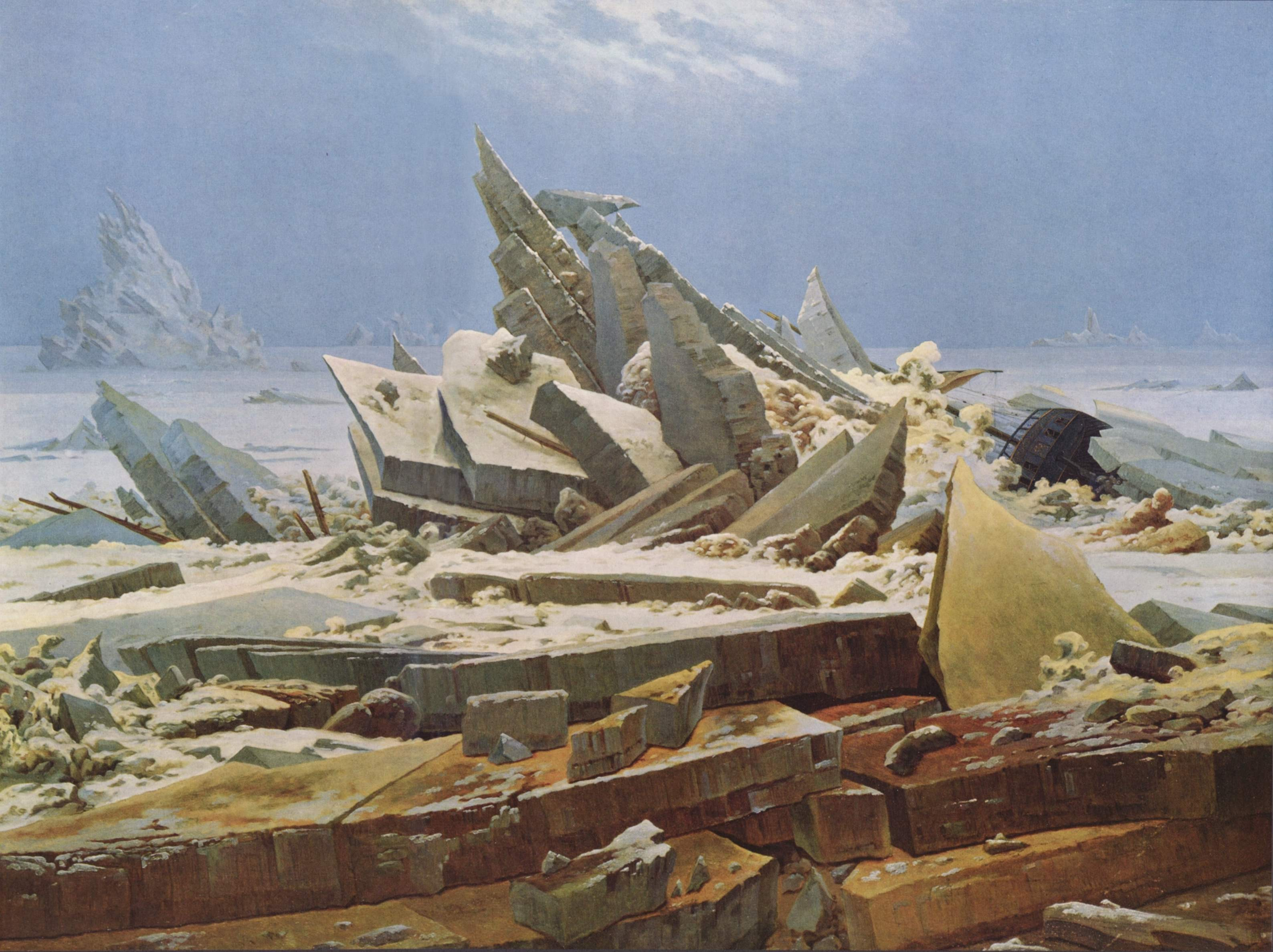
1824, Caspar David Friedrich's Das Eismeer (The Sea of Ice)

Throughout the 18th and 19th centuries philosophies of aesthetics had been developing, particularly through the work of Kant and Schopenhauer and notions of the sublime. The experience of the sublime was supposed to involve a self-forgetfulness where personal fear is replaced by a sense of well-being and security when confronted with an object exhibiting superior might. At the end of the nineteenth century the German Kunstwissenschaft, or the "science of art", arose, which was a movement to discern laws of aesthetic appreciation and arrive at a scientific approach to aesthetic experience. At the beginning of the twentieth century Neo-Kantian German philosopher and theorist of aesthetics Max Dessoir founded the Zeitschift für Ästhetik und allgemeine Kunstwissenschaft, which he edited for many years, and published the work Ästhetik und allgemeine Kunstwissenschaft in which he formulated five primary aesthetic forms: the beautiful, the sublime, the tragic, the ugly, and the comic. Iain Boyd Whyte writes that whilst "the Expressionist visionaries did not keep copies of Kant under their drawing boards. There was, however, in the first decades of this century [20th] a climate of ideas that was sympathetic to the aesthetic concerns and artistic production of romanticism.

Artistic theories of Wassily Kandinsky, such as Concerning the Spiritual in Art, and Point and Line to Plane were centerpieces of expressionist thinking.

== Materials ==
A recurring concern of expressionist architects was the use of materials and how they might be poetically expressed. Often, the intention was to unify the materials in a building so as to make it monolithic. The collaboration of Bruno Taut and the utopian poet Paul Scheerbart attempted to address the problems of German society by a doctrine of glass architecture. Such utopianism can be seen in the context of a revolutionary Germany where the tussle between nationalism and socialism had yet to resolve itself. Taut and Scheerbart imagined a society that had freed itself by breaking from past forms and traditions, impelled by an architecture that flooded every building with multicolored light and represented a more promising future. They published texts on this subject and built the Glass Pavilion at the 1914 Werkbund Exhibition. Inscribed around the base of the dome were aphoristic sayings about the material, penned by Scheerbart: "Coloured glass destroys hatred", "Without a glass palace life is a burden", "Glass brings us a new era, building in brick only does us harm."

Another example of expressionist use of monolithic materials was by Erich Mendelsohn at the Einstein Tower. Not to be missed was a pun on the tower's namesake, Einstein, and an attempt to make the building out of one stone, that is, Ein Stein. Though not cast in one pour of concrete (due to technical difficulties, brick and stucco were used partially) the effect of the building is an expression of the fluidity of concrete before it is cast. 'Architecture of Steel and Concrete' was the title of a 1919 exhibition of Mendelsohn's sketches at Paul Cassirer's gallery in Berlin.

Brick was used in a similar fashion to express the inherent nature of the material. Josef Franke produced some characteristic expressionist churches in the Ruhrgebiet in the 1920s. Bruno Taut used brick as a way to show mass and repetition in his Berlin housing estate "Legien-Stadt". In the same way as their Arts and Crafts movement predecessors, to expressionist architects, populism, naturalism, and according to Pehnt "Moral and sometimes even irrational arguments were adduced in favor of building in brick". With its color and pointillist like visual increment, brick became to expressionism what stucco later became to the International Style.

== Theatres, films, paintings and magazines ==
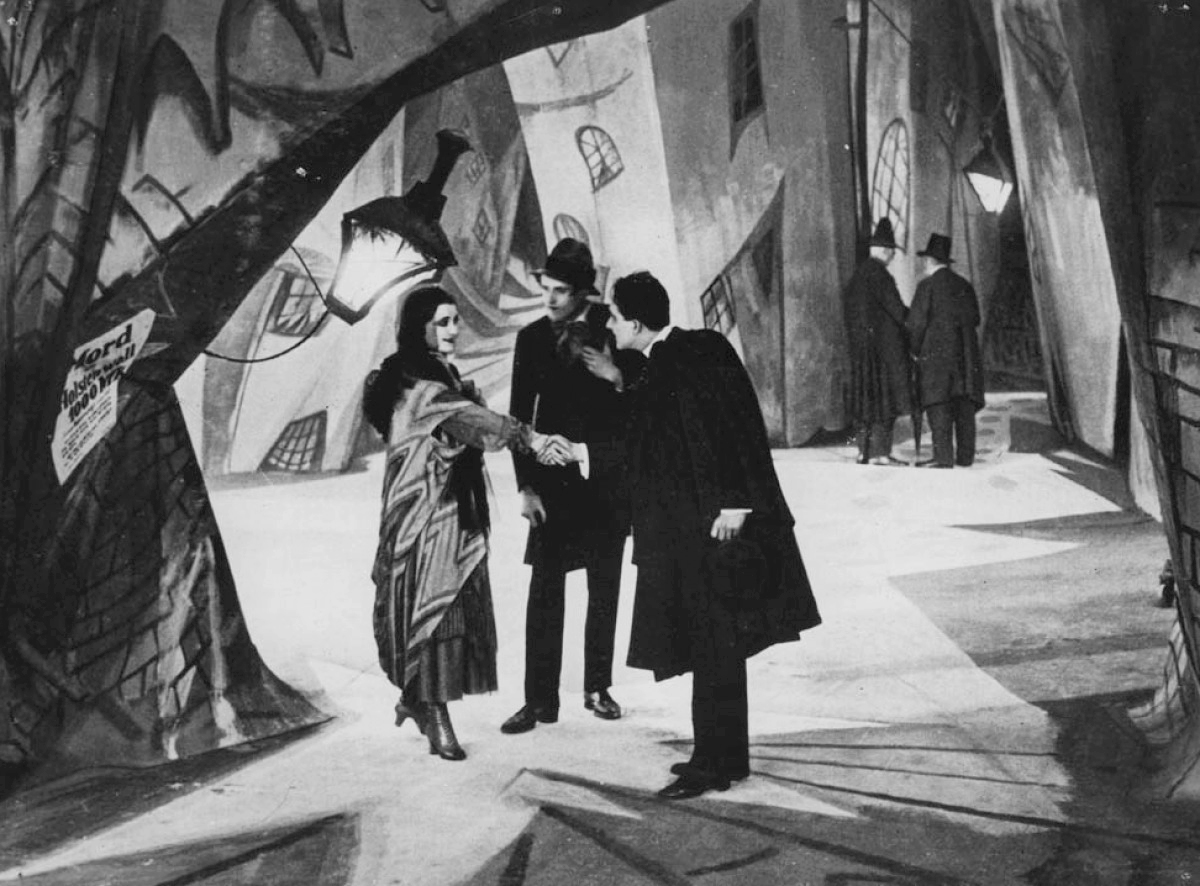
An example of expressionist architecture in the film set for The Cabinet of Dr. Caligari, 1928.

Europe witnessed a boom in theatrical production in the early twentieth century; from 1896 to 1926, the continent's 302 permanent theatres became 2,499. Cinema witnessed a comparable increase in its use and popularity and a resulting increase in the number of picture houses. It was also able to provide a temporary reality for innovative architectural ideas.

Many architects designed theatres for performances on the stage and film sets for expressionist films. These were defining moments for the movement, and with its interest in theatres and films, the performing arts held a significant place in expressionist architecture. Like film, and theatre, expressionist architecture created an unusual and exotic environment to surround the visitor.

Built examples of expressionist theatres include Henry van de Velde's construction of the model theatre for the 1914 Werkbund Exhibition, and Hans Poelzig's grand remodelling of the Großes Schauspielhaus. The enormous capacity of the Großes Schauspielhaus enabled low ticket prices, and the creation of a "people's theatre". Not only were expressionist architects building stages, Bruno Taut wrote a play intended for the theatre, Weltbaumeister.

Expressionist architects were both involved in film and inspired by it. Hans Poelzig strove to make films based on legends or fairy tales. Poelzig designed scenographic sets for Paul Wegener's 1920 film Der Golem. Space in Der Golem was a three-dimensional village, a lifelike rendering of the Jewish ghetto of Prague. This contrasts with the setting of the Cabinet of Doctor Caligari, which was painted on canvas backdrops. Perhaps the latter was able to achieve more stylistic freedom, but Poelzig in Der Golem was able to create a whole village that "spoke with a Jewish accent."

Herman Finsterlin approached Fritz Lang with an idea for a film. Fritz Lang's film Metropolis demonstrates a visually progressive 'Futurist' society dealing with relevant issues of 1920s Germany in relation to labour and society. Bruno Taut designed an unbuilt theatre for reclining cinema-goers. Bruno Taut also proposed a film as an anthology for the Glass Chain, entitled Die Galoschen des Glücks(The Galoshes of Fortune) with a name borrowed from Hans Christian Andersen. On the film, Taut noted, "an expressionism of the most subtle kind will bring surroundings, props and action into harmony with one another". It featured architectural fantasias suited to each member of the Chain. Ultimately unproduced, it reveals the aspiration that the new medium, film, invoked.

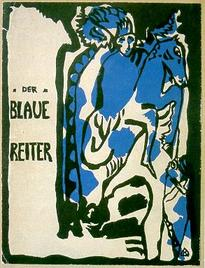
DER BLAUE REITER almanac 1912, cover by Wassily Kandinsky. Two groups of Expressionist painters: "Der Blaue Reiter" in Munich since 1912 and "Die Brücke" in Dresden since 1905.

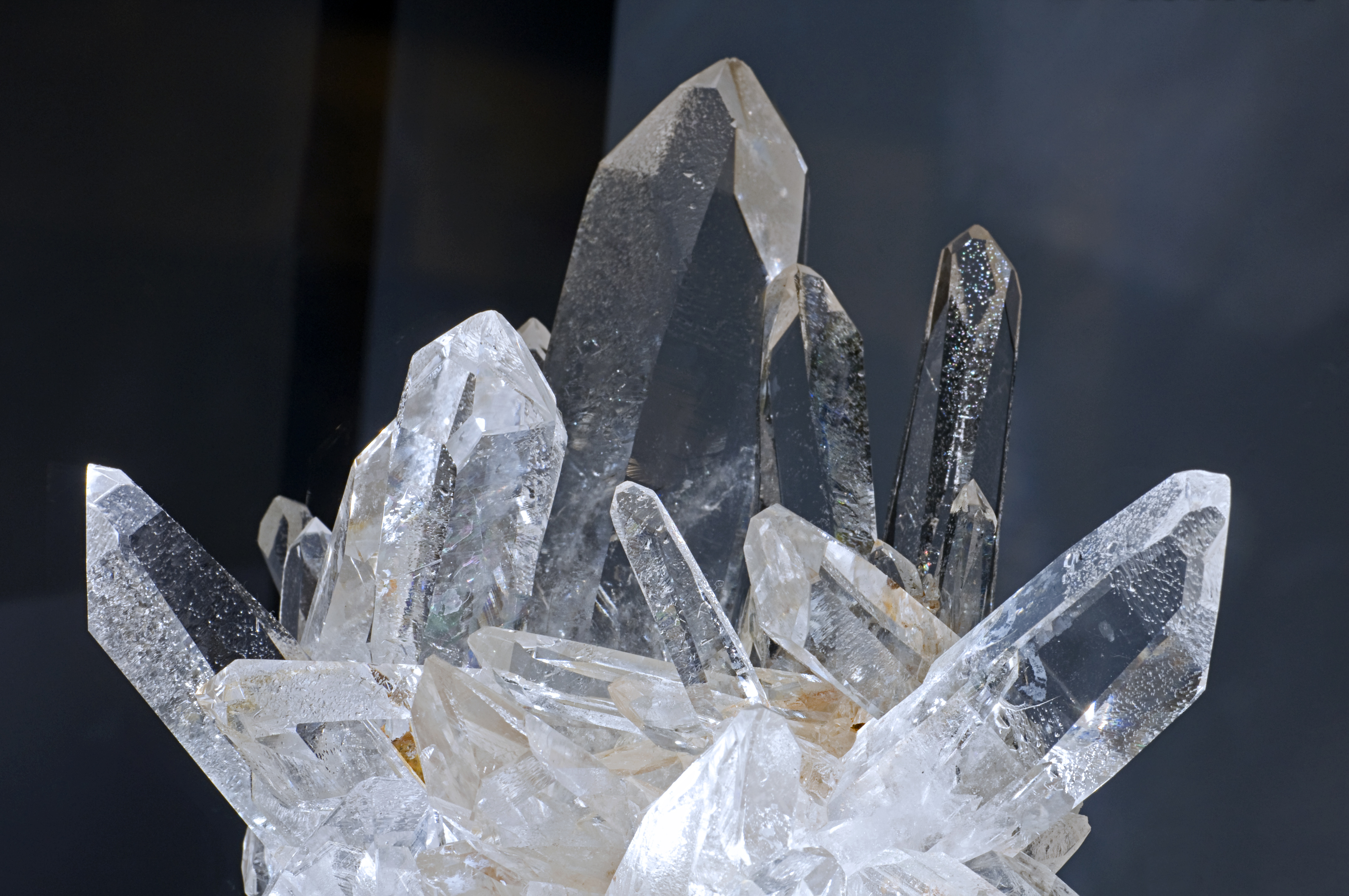
WENDINGEN 1924-11/12, "Crystals", 40 ill., inspiration for Expressionist architects

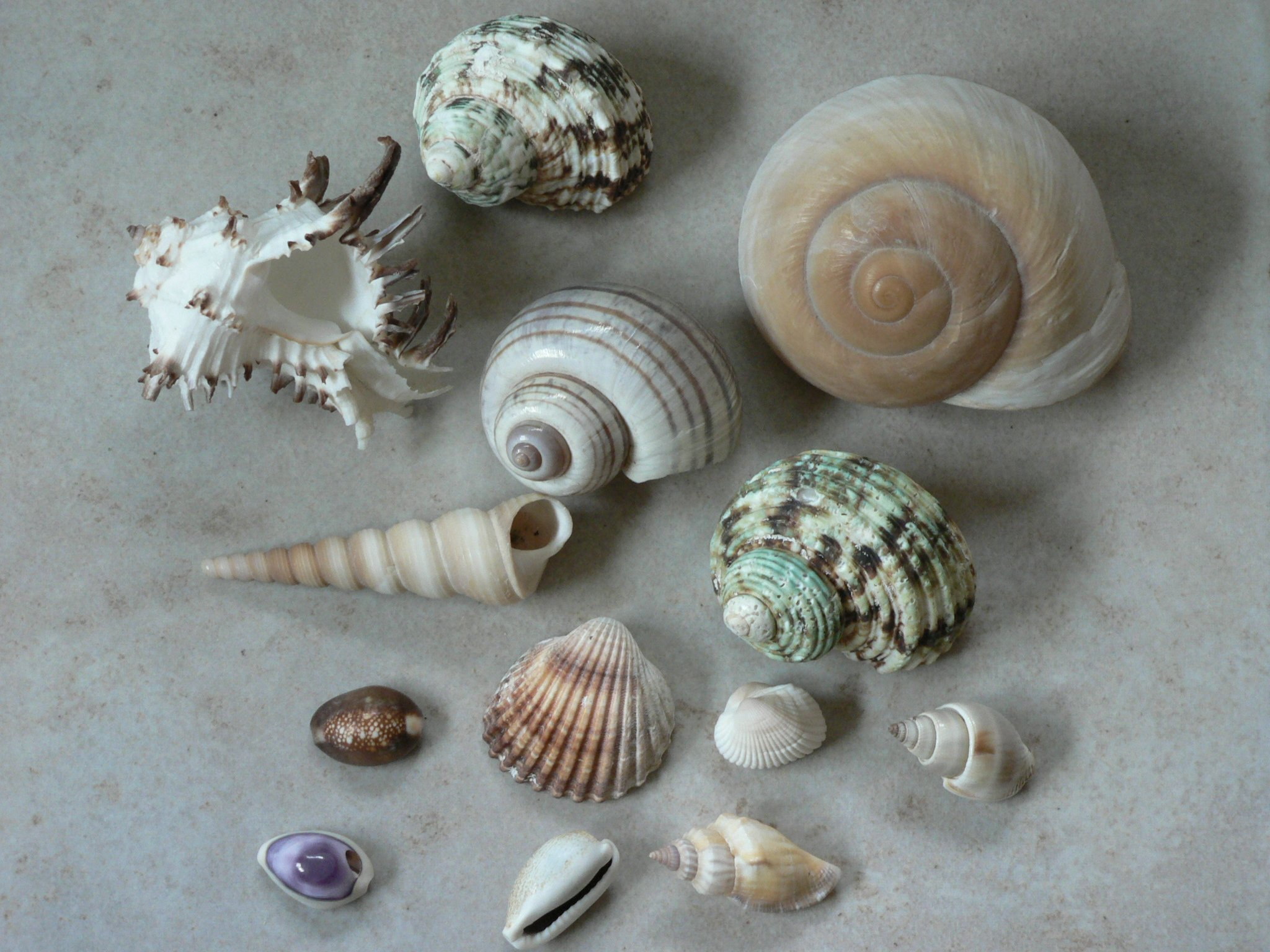
WENDINGEN 1923-8/9, "Shells", 65 ill., inspiration for Expressionist architects

== Abstraction ==
The tendency towards abstraction in art corresponded with abstraction in architecture. Publication of Concerning the Spiritual in Art in 1912 by Wassily Kandinsky, his first advocacy of abstraction while still involved in Der Blaue Reiter phase, marks a beginning of abstraction in expressionism and abstraction in expressionist architecture. The conception of the Einstein Tower by Erich Mendelson was not far behind Kandinsky, in advancing abstraction in architecture. By the publication of Kandinsky's Point and Line to Plane in 1926 a rigorous and more geometric form of abstraction emerged, and Kandinsky's work took on clearer and drafted lines. The trends in architecture are not dissimilar, as the Bauhaus was gaining attention and Expressionist architecture was giving way to the geometric abstractions of modern architecture.

== Brick Expressionism ==
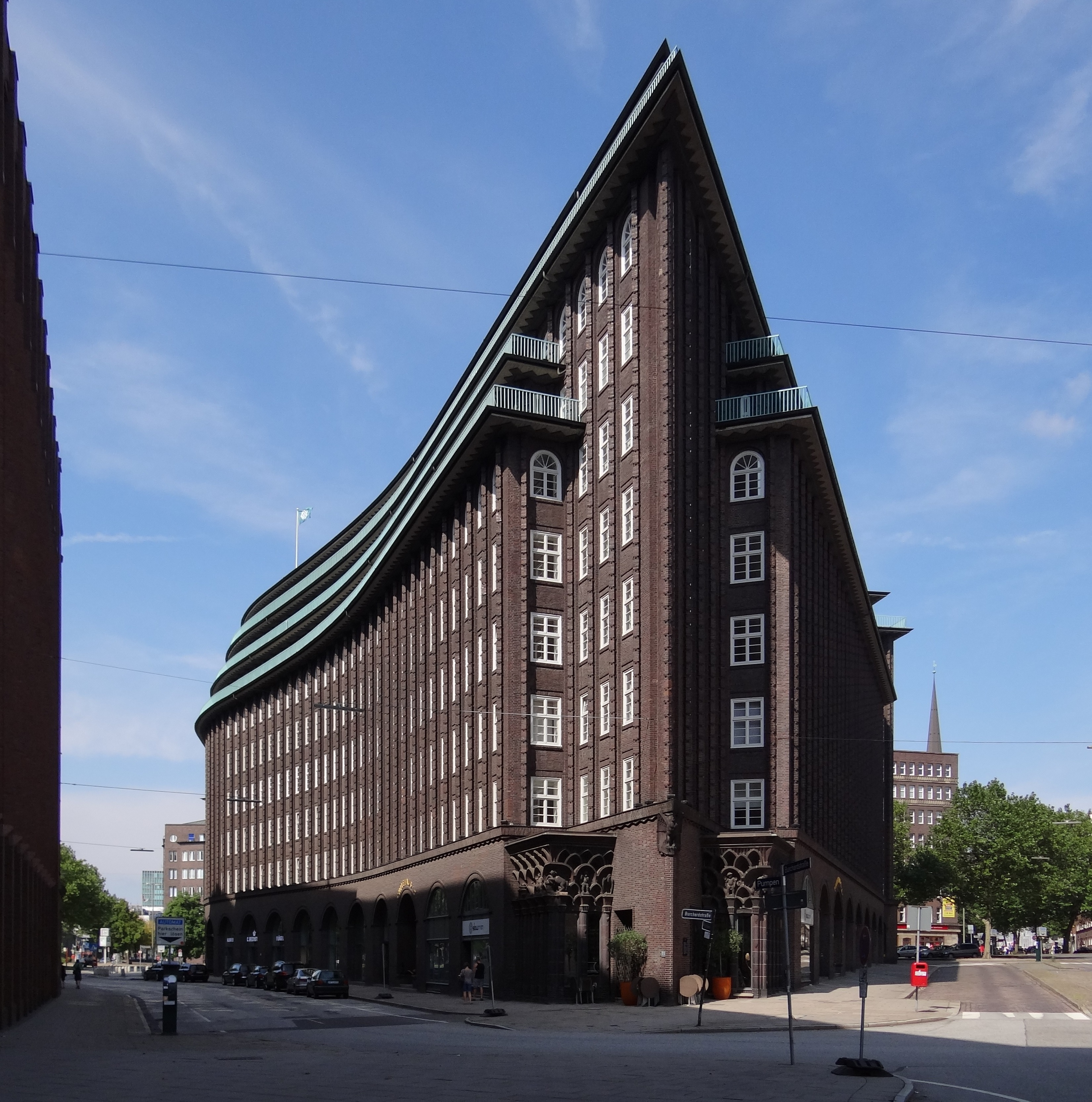
Chilehaus in Hamburg, 1923 (Fritz Höger)

The term Brick Expressionism (German: Backsteinexpressionismus) describes a specific variant of expressionism that uses bricks, tiles or clinker bricks as the main visible building material. Buildings in the style were erected mostly in the 1920s. The style's regional centres were the larger cities of Northern Germany and the Ruhr area, but the Amsterdam School belongs to the same category.

Amsterdam's 1912 cooperative-commercial Scheepvaarthuis (Shipping House) is considered the starting point and prototype for Amsterdam School work: brick construction with complicated masonry, traditional massing, and the integration of an elaborate scheme of building elements (decorative masonry, art glass, wrought-iron work, and exterior figurative sculpture) that embodies and expresses the identity of the building. The School flourished until about 1925.

The great international fame of German Expressionism is not related to the German Brick Expressionist architects, but to the German Expressionist painters of the two groups Die Brücke in Dresden since 1905 (Kirchner, Schmidt-Rottluff, Heckel, Nolde) and Der Blaue Reiter in Munich since 1912 (Kandinsky, Marc, Macke, Münter, Jawlensky).

== Expressionism since the 1950s ==
The influential architectural critic and historian Sigfried Giedion in his book Space, Time and Architecture (1941) dismissed Expressionist architecture as a side show in the development of functionalism. In the middle of the twentieth century, in the 50s and 60s, many architects began designing in a manner reminiscent of Expressionist architecture. In this post war period, a variant of Expressionism, Brutalism, had an honest approach to materials, that in its unadorned use of concrete was similar to the use of brick by the Amsterdam School. The designs of Le Corbusier took a turn for the expressionist in his brutalist phase, but more so in his Notre-Dame du Haut.

In Mexico, in 1953, German émigré Mathias Goeritz, published the "Arquitectura Emocional" (Emotional architecture) manifesto where he declared that "architecture's principal function is emotion." Modern Mexican architect Luis Barragán adopted the term that influenced his work. The two of them collaborated in the project Torres de Satélite (1957–58) guided by Goeritz's principles of Arquitectura Emocional.

Another mid-century modern architect to evoke expressionism was Eero Saarinen. A similar aesthetic can be found in later buildings such as Saarinen's 1962 TWA Terminal at JFK International Airport. His TWA Terminal at JFK International Airport has an organic form, as close to Herman Finsterlin's Formspiels as any other, save Jørn Utzon's Sydney Opera House. It was only in the 1970s that expressionism in architecture came to be re-evaluated in a more positive light.

More recently still, the aesthetics and tactility of expressionist architecture have found echo in the works of Enric Miralles, most notably his Scottish Parliament building, deconstructivist architects such as Zaha Hadid and Daniel Libeskind, as well as Canadian Aboriginal architect Douglas Cardinal.

The Chapel of Notre-Dame du Haut in Ronchamp, 1950–1955 (Le Corbusier)

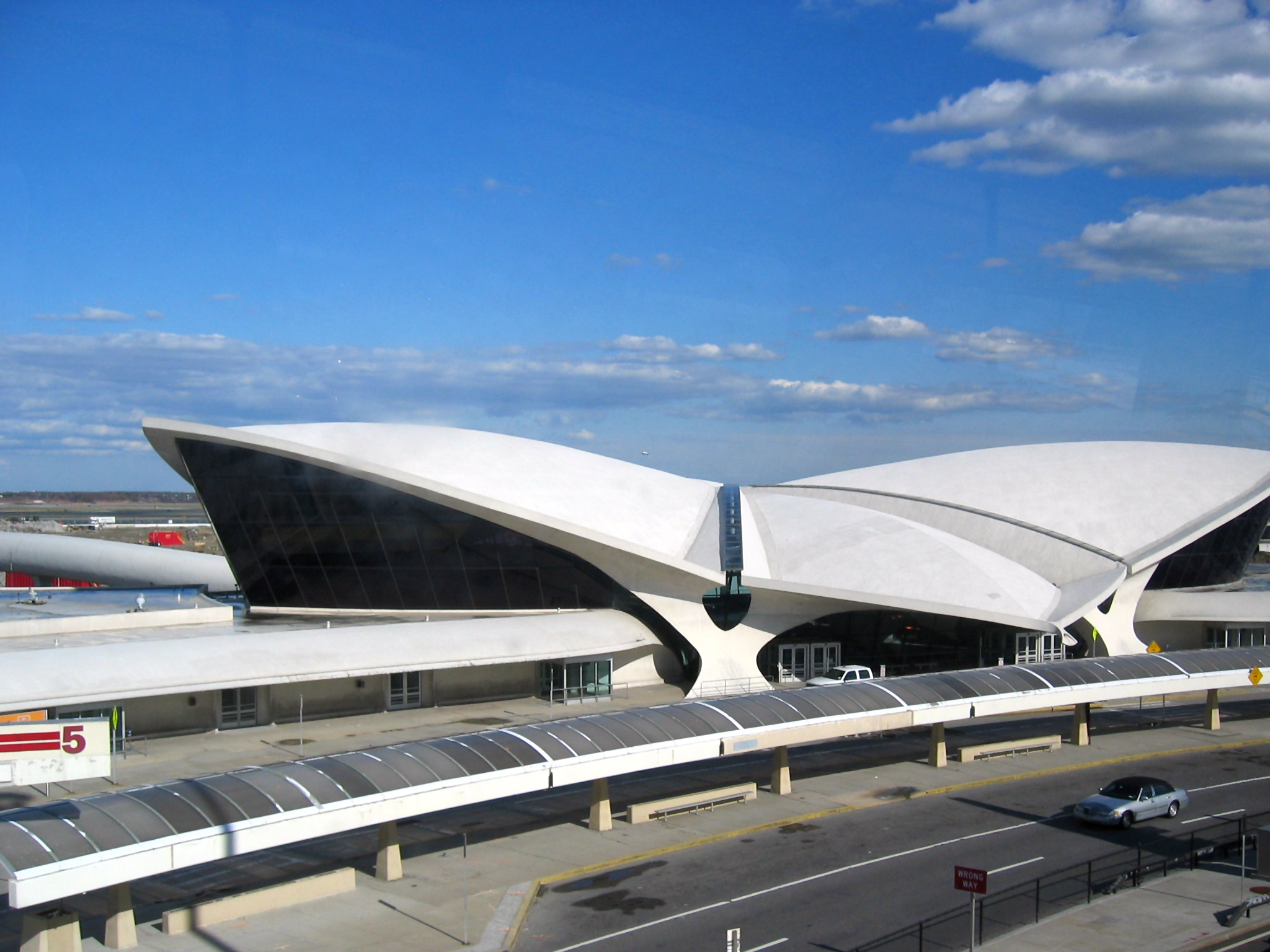
JFK International Airport in New York City, TWA Terminal, 1956–62 (Eero Saarinen)

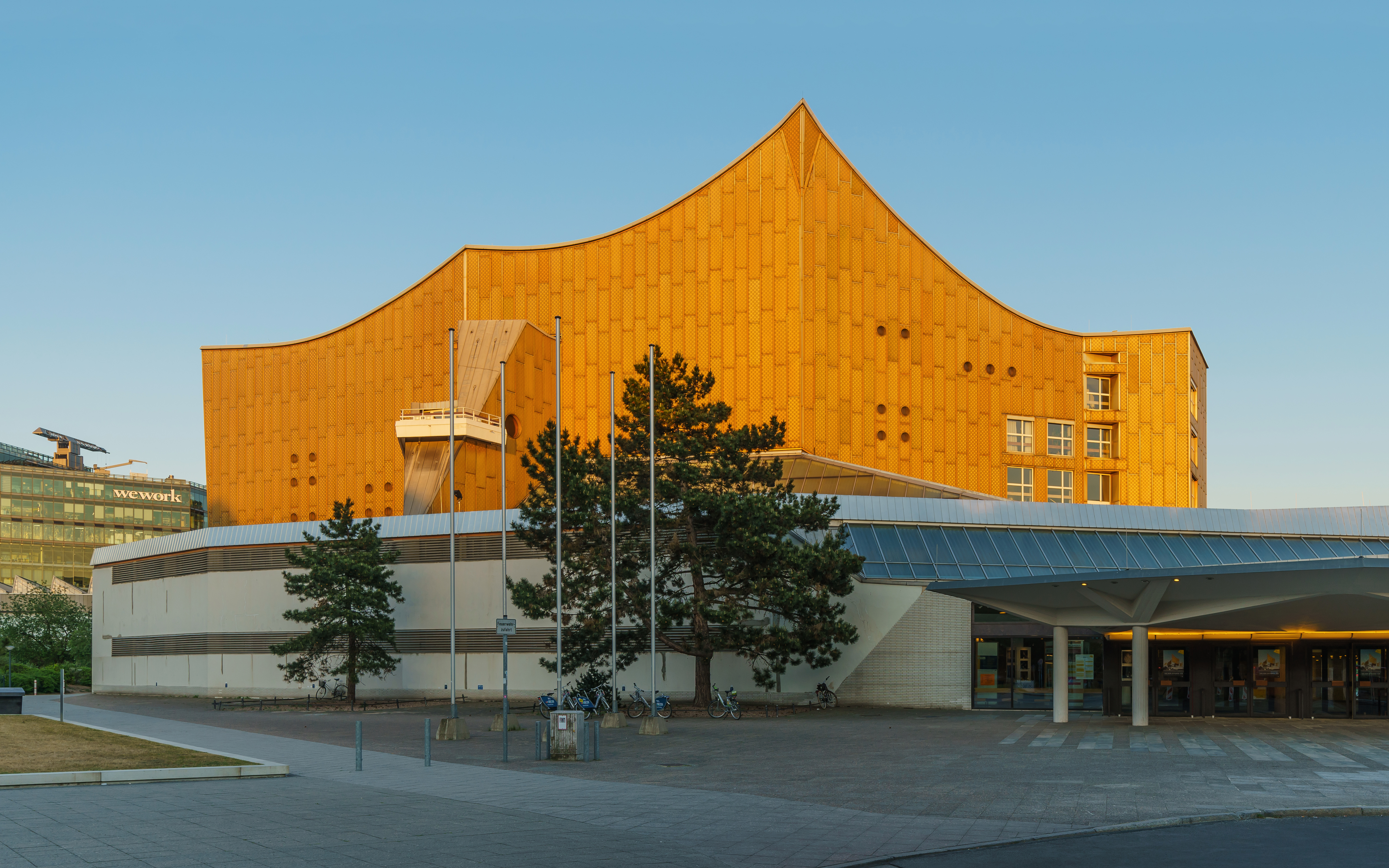
The Berliner Philharmonie, 1956–1963 (Hans Scharoun)

Interior of the Berliner Philharmonie

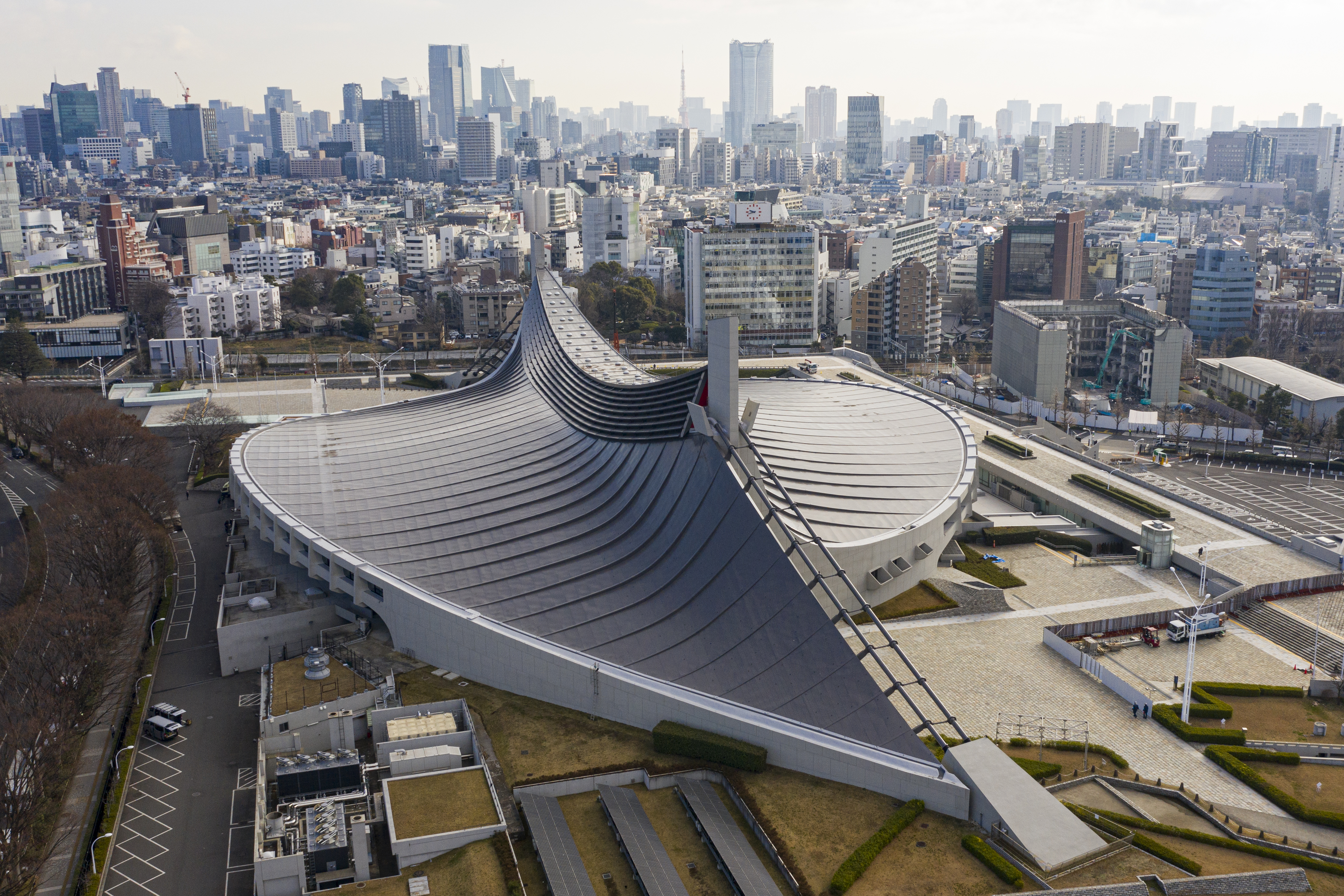
Yoyogi National Gymnasium in Tokyo, 1964 (Kenzo Tange)

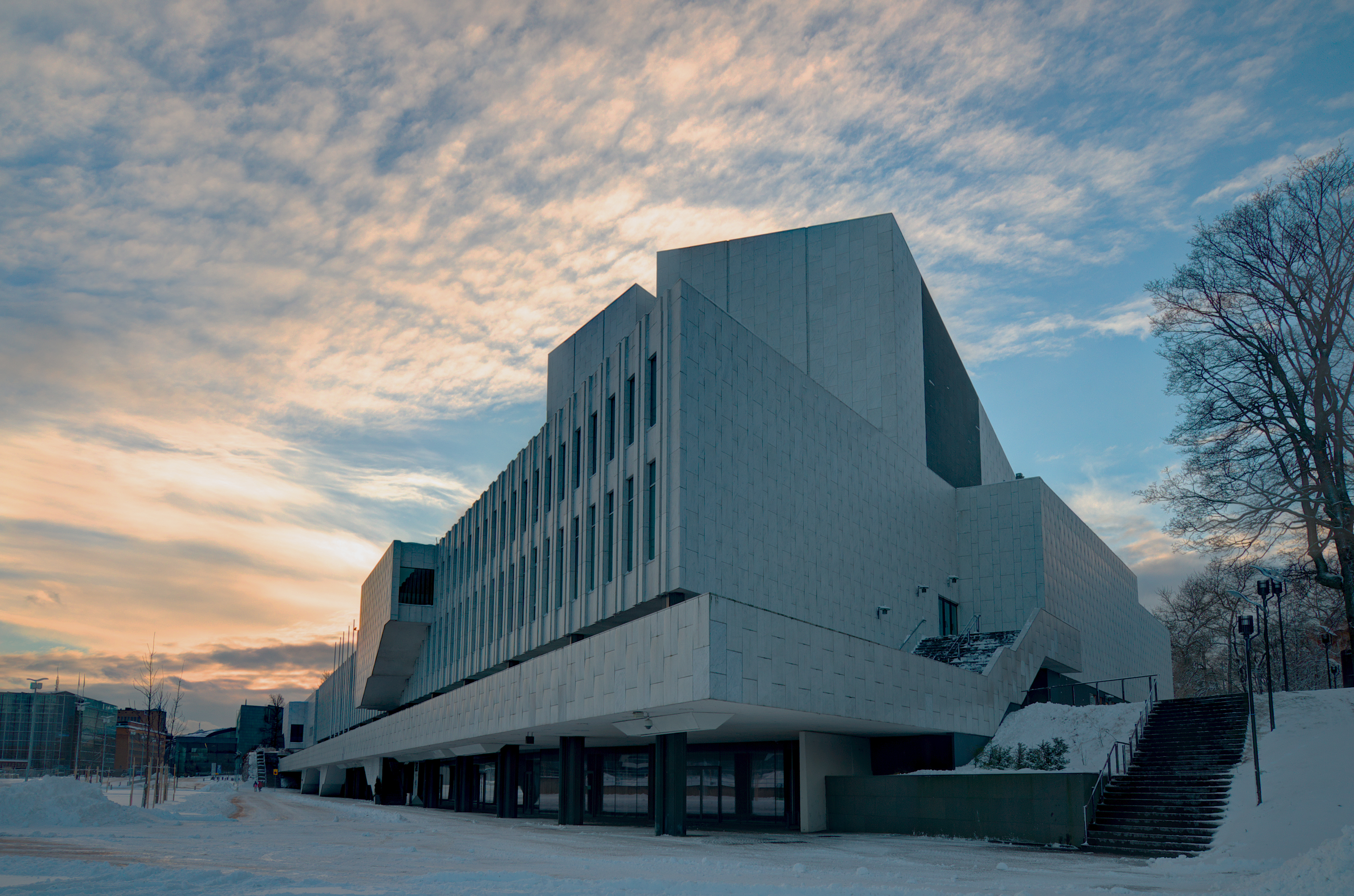
Finlandia Hall in Helsinki, 1971 (Alvar Aalto)

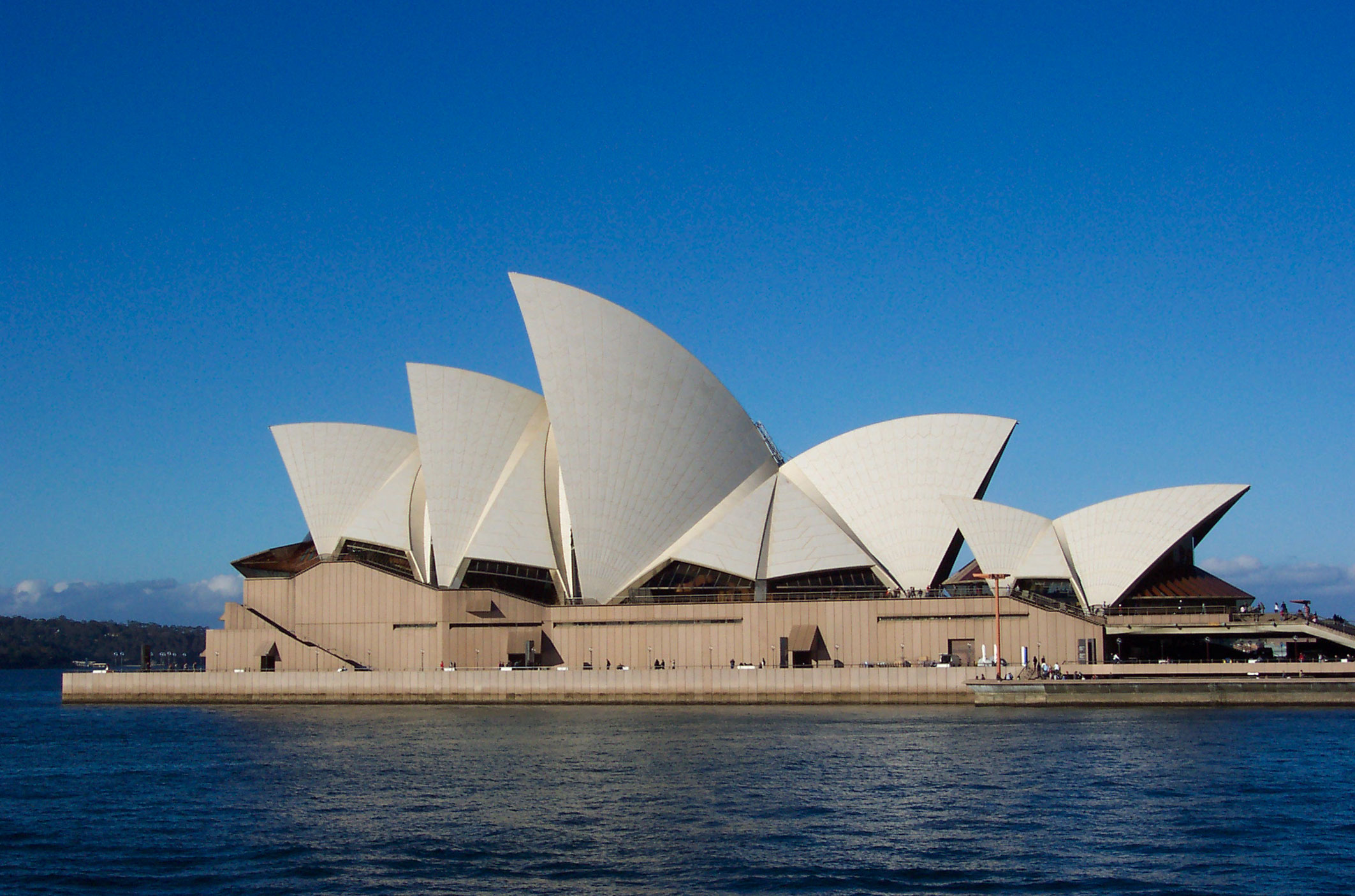
Sydney Opera House, 1957–1973 (Jørn Utzon)

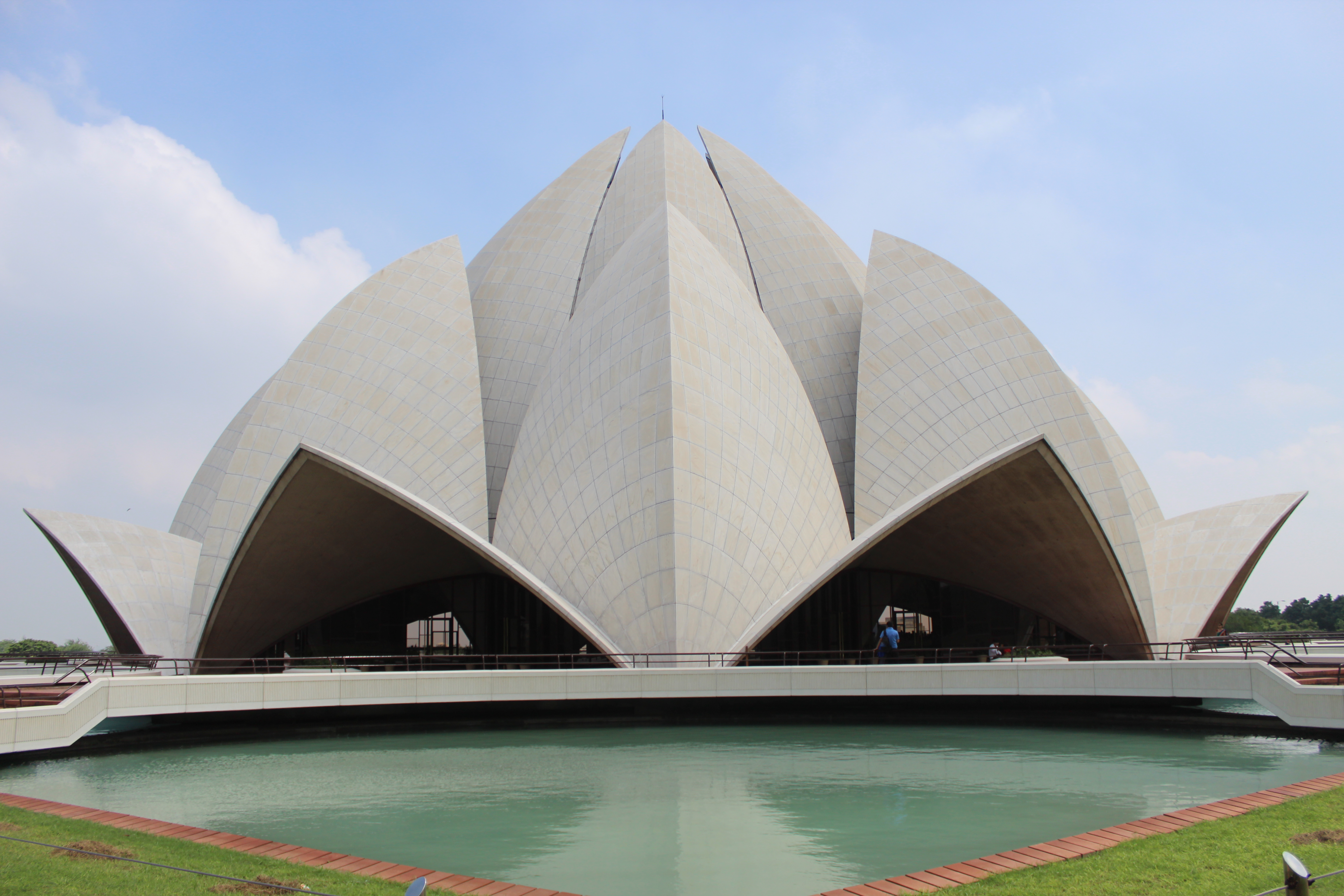
Lotus Temple, in Delhi, 1986 (Fariborz Sahba)

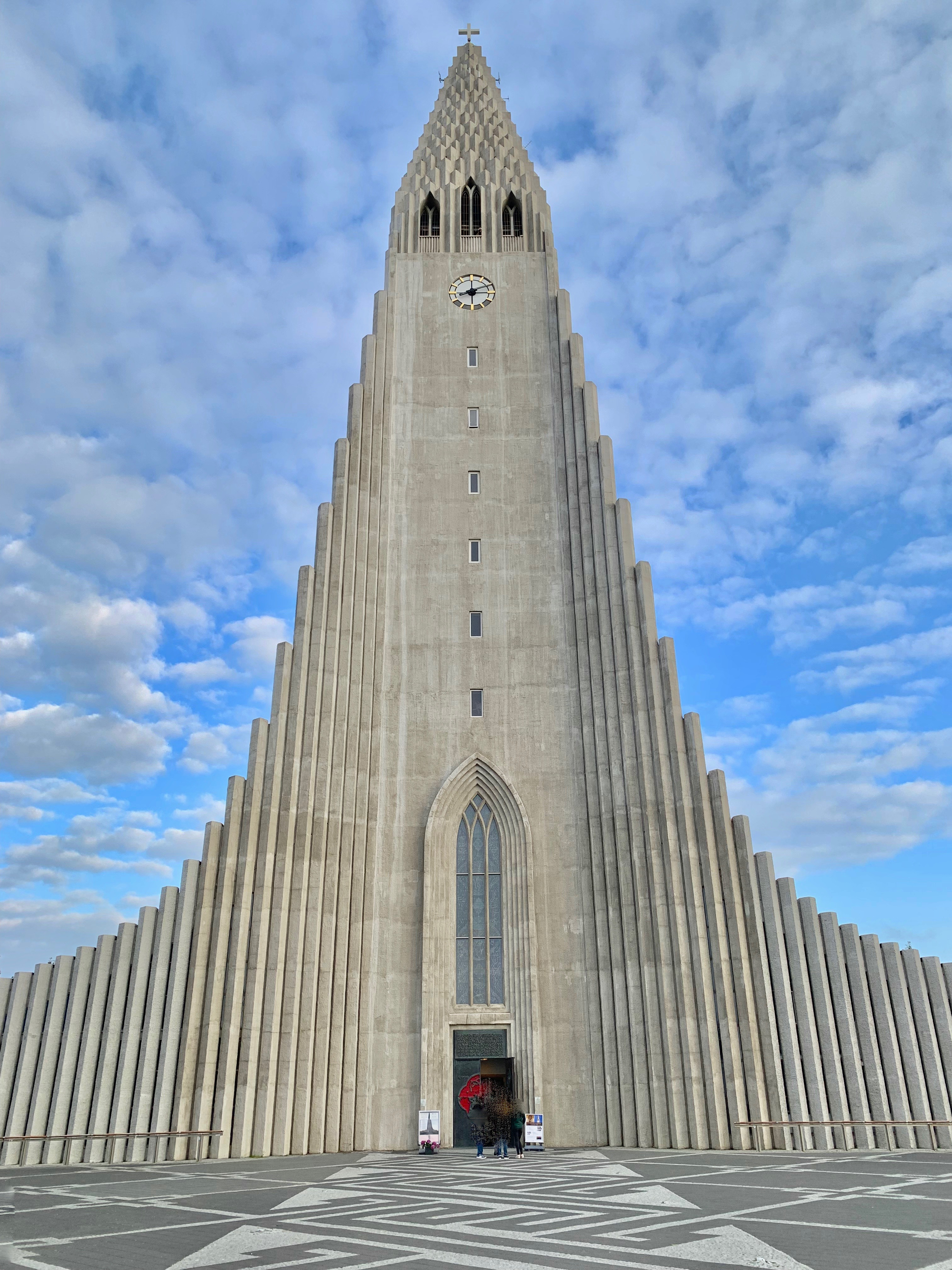
Hallgrímskirkja in Reykjavík, 1986 (Guðjón Samúelsson)

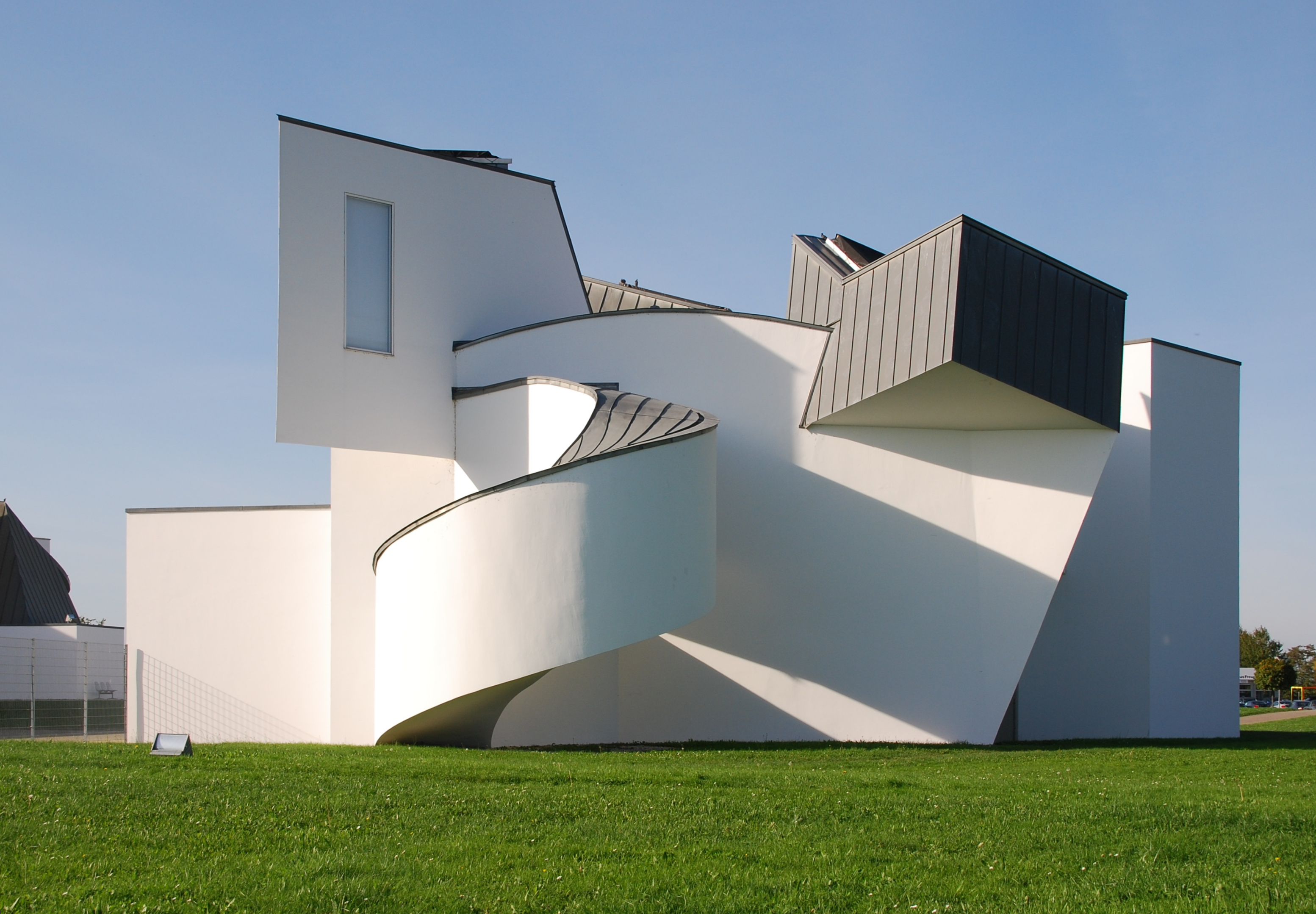
Vitra Design Museum in Weil am Rhein, 1989 (Frank Gehry)

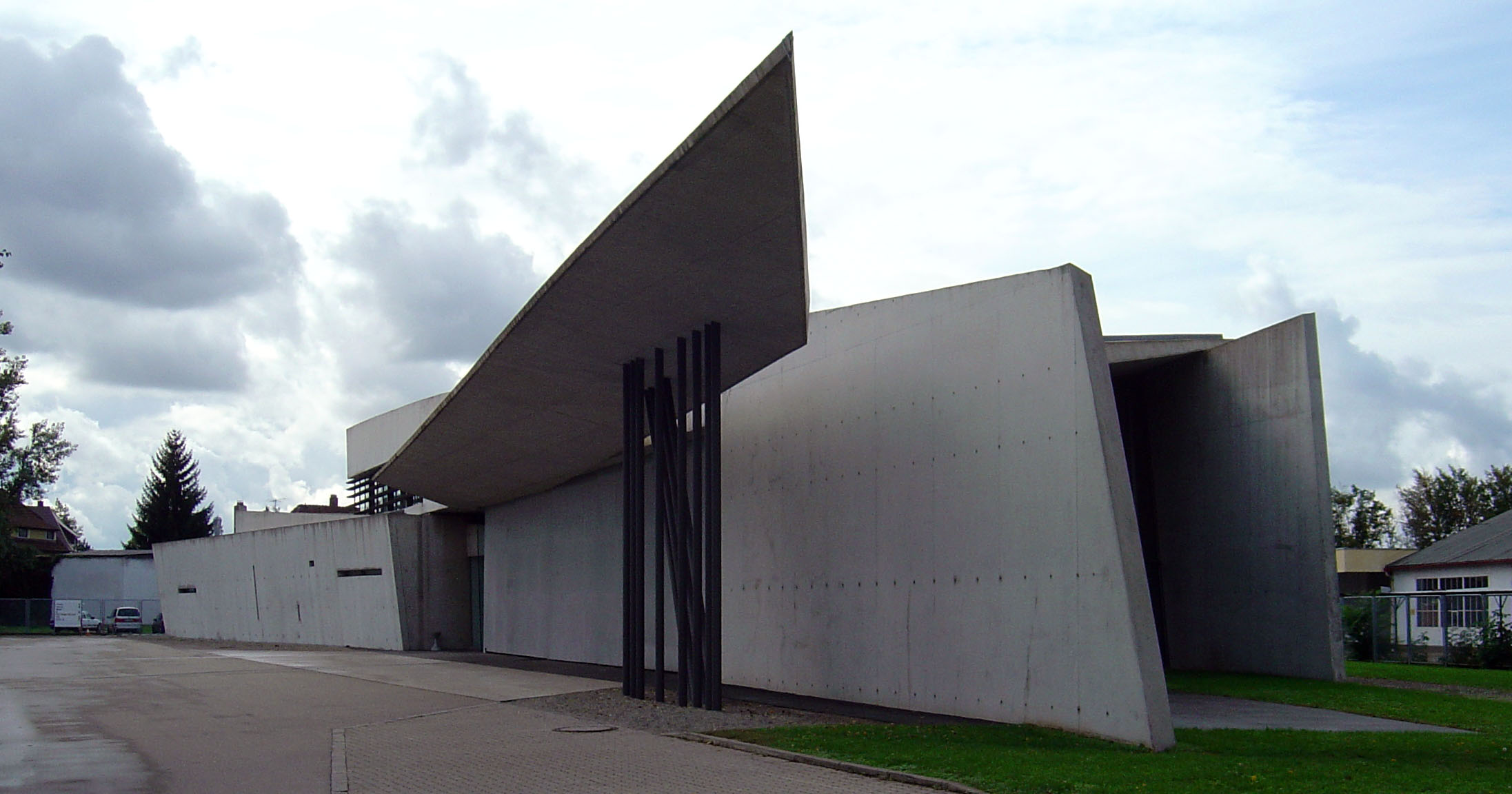
Vitra Fire Station in Weil am Rhein, 1994 (Zaha Hadid)

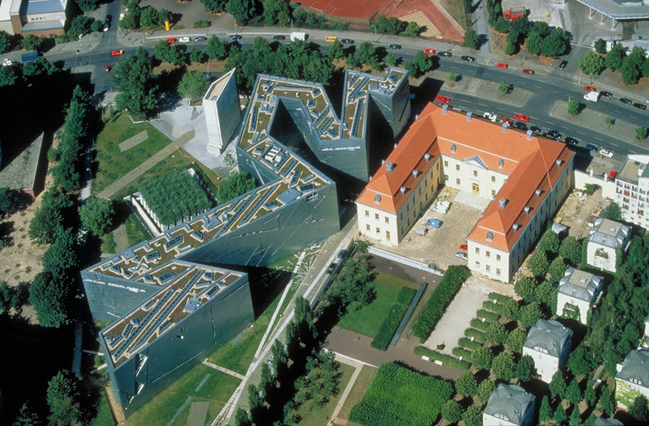
Jewish Museum in Berlin, 1989–1999 (Daniel Libeskind)

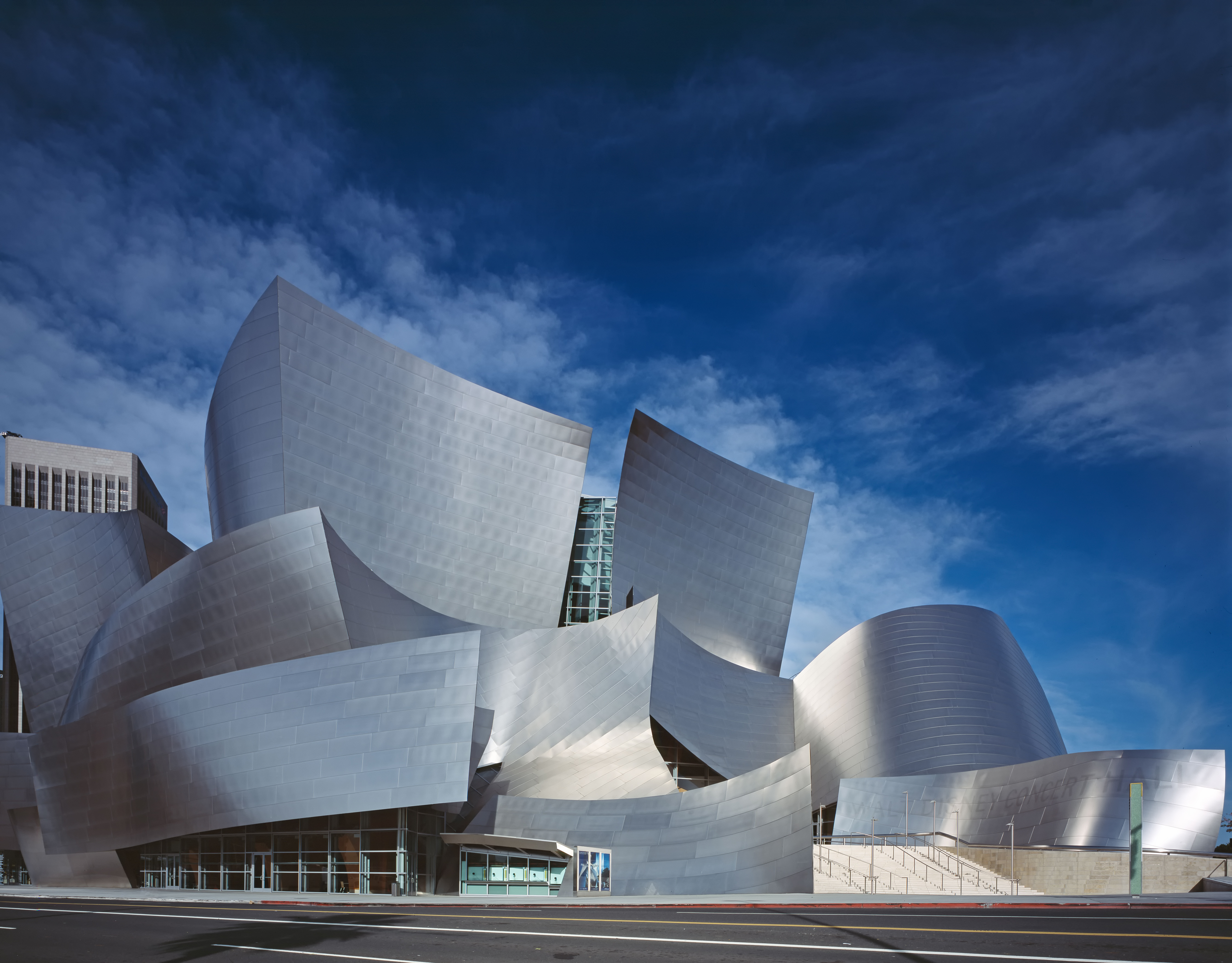
Walt Disney Concert Hall in Los Angeles, 2003 (Frank Gehry)

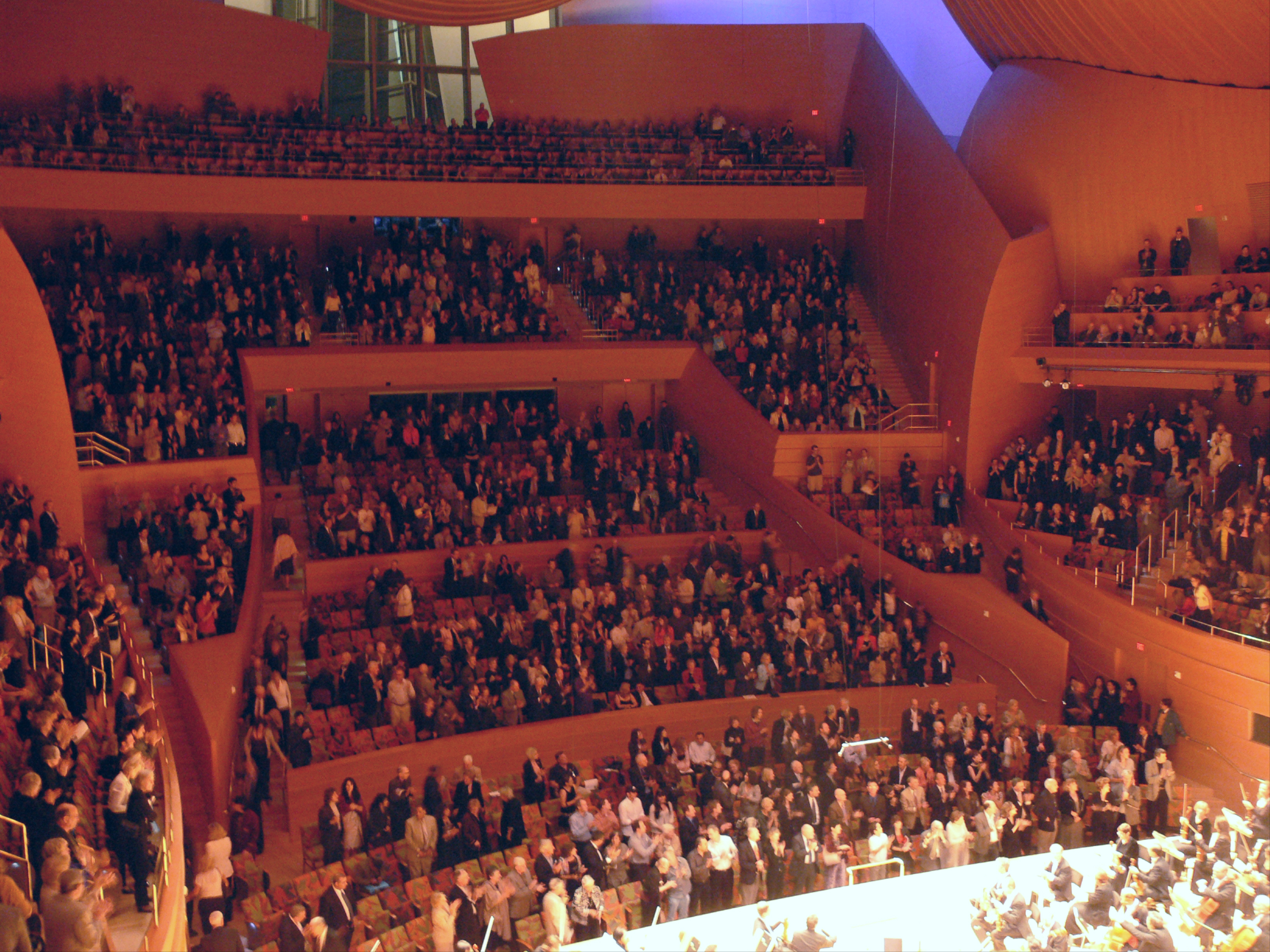
Walt Disney Concert Hall, inside

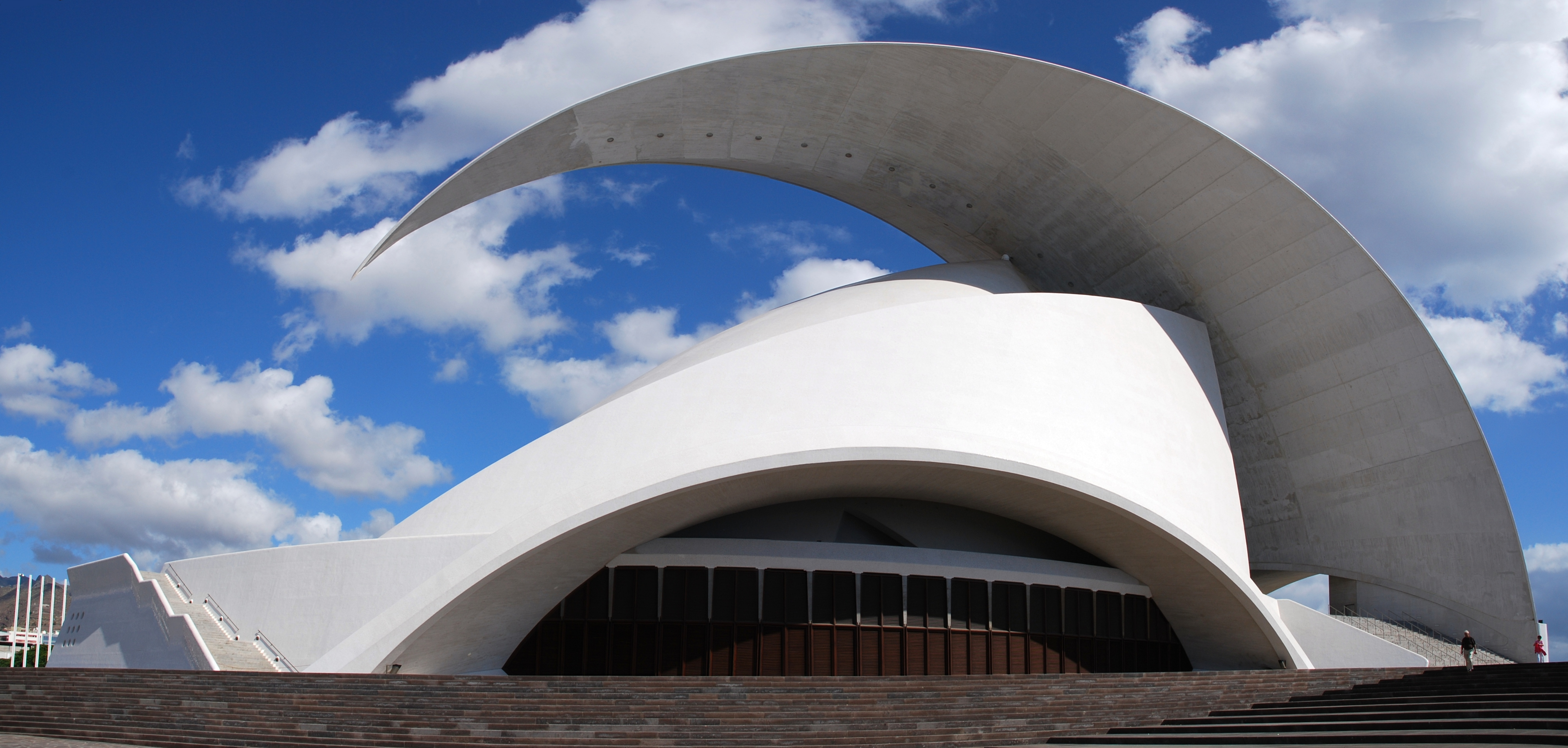
Auditorio de Tenerife, Canary Islands, 2003 (Santiago Calatrava)

== Timeline ==
=== 1900 ===
- Reactions to Art Nouveau impelled partly by moral yearnings for a sterner and more unadorned style and in part by rationalist ideas requiring practical justification for formal effects. Art Nouveau had however, opened up a language of abstraction and pointed to lessons to be learned from nature.
- August 25, 1900, death of Friedrich Nietzsche.

1905

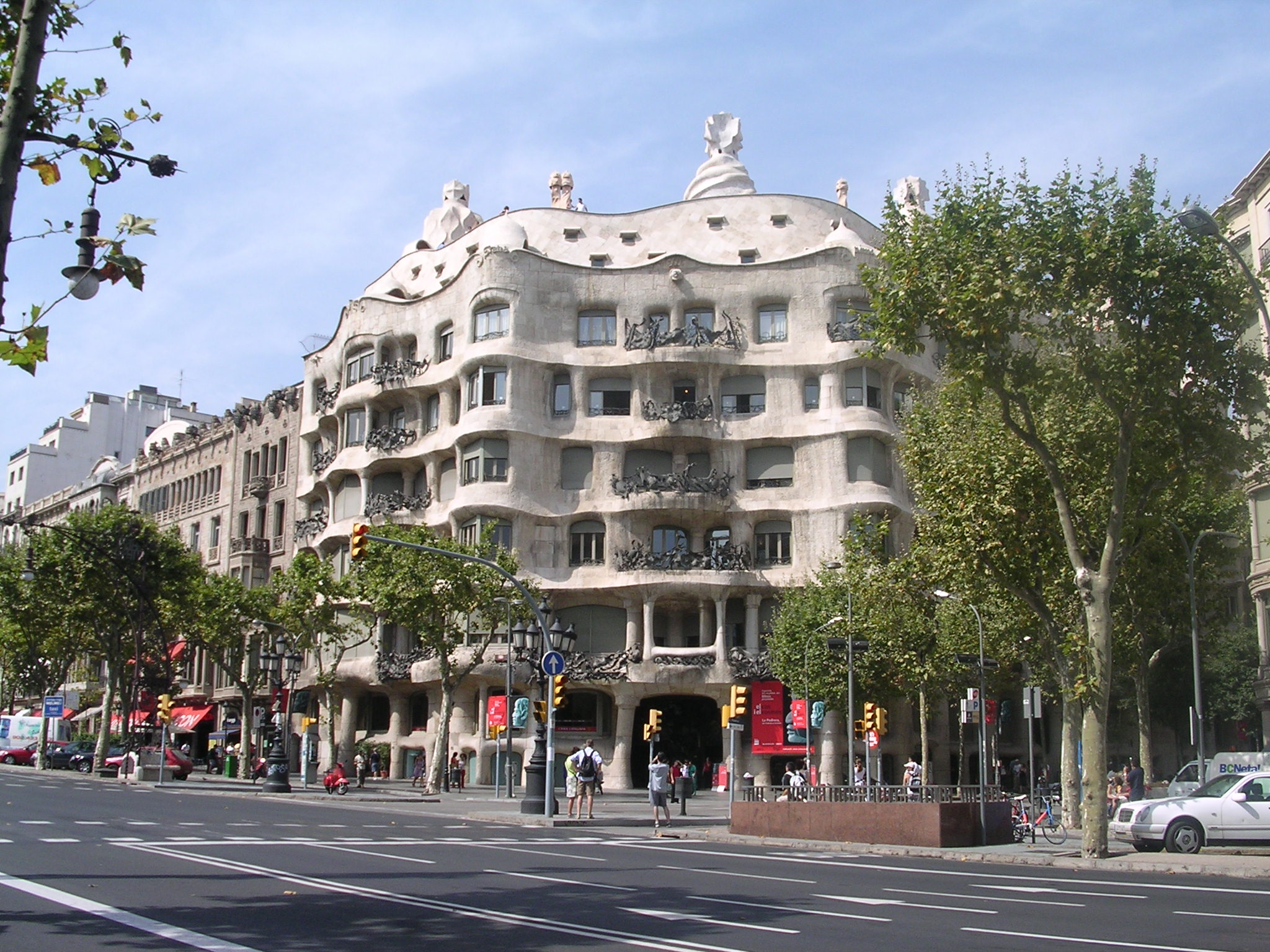
Casa Milà in Barcelona, 1905–1912 (Antoni Gaudi)

- Formation of the Dresden Die Brücke expressionist art movement.
- Construction of the Casa Milà, a forerunner of the movement, begins.

1907

- The poet Paul Scheerbart independently offers a science fiction image of utopian future.

1909

- (1909–1912) Adolf Loos gives a collection of speeches throughout Germany that eventually become his satirical essay/manifesto "Ornament and Crime", which rejects applied ornament in favour of abstraction.
- The New Munich Artist's Association, Neue Künstlervereinigung München, is established by Wassily Kandinsky and others in Munich.

=== 1910 ===
- Publication in Berlin of the journals Der Sturm by Herwarth Walden and Die Aktion by Franz Pfemfert as counterculture mouthpieces against the Deutscher Werkbund.

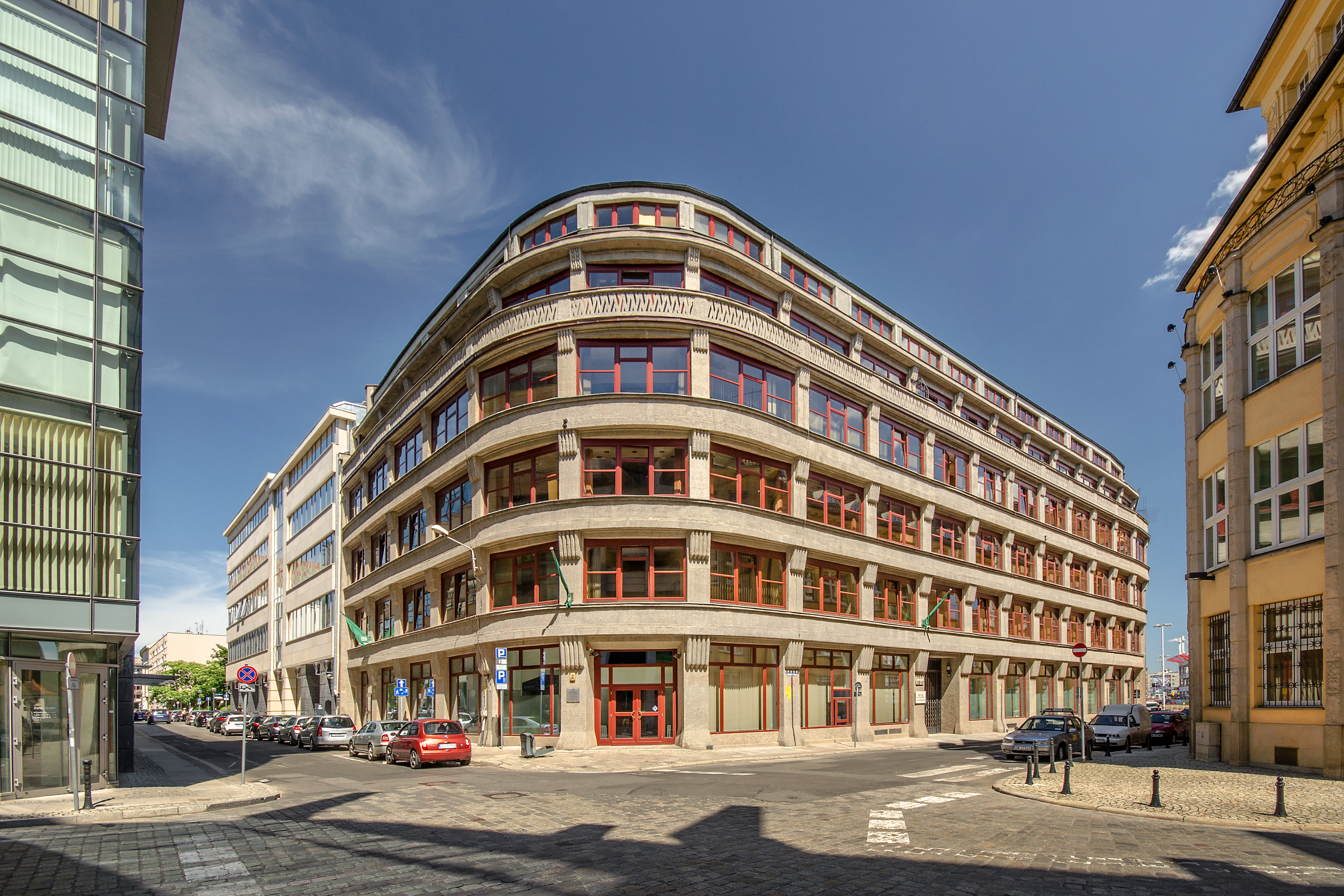
Geschäftshaus Junkernstraße by Hans Poelzig, Breslau/Wrocław, 1911

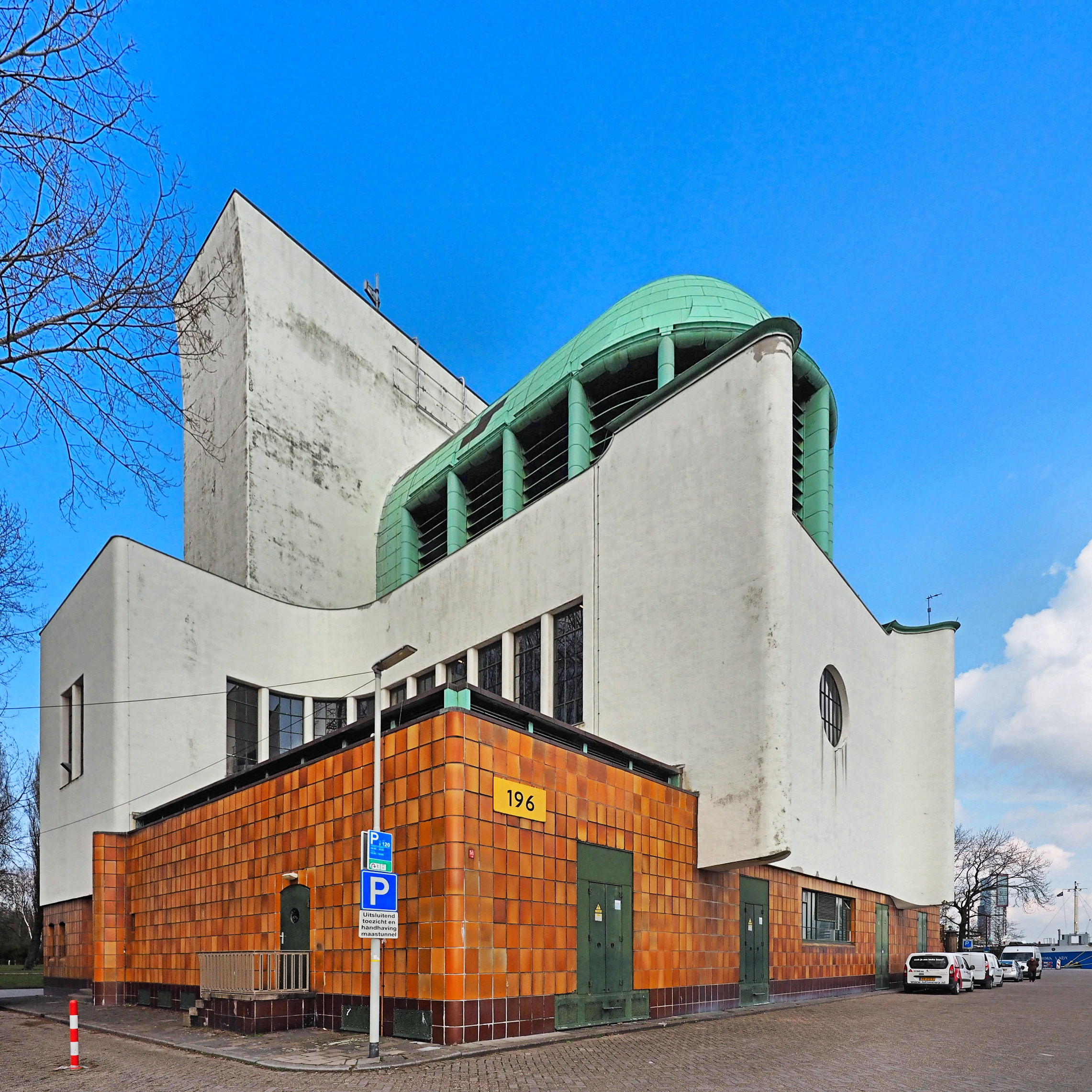
The ventilation tower of the Maastunnel in Rotterdam, 1937 (Ad van der Steur)

1911

- Hans Poelzig sets up practice in Breslau (now Wrocław, Poland). Designs a water tower for Posen (now Poznań, Poland), described by Kenneth Frampton as a certain Die Stadtkrone image, and an office building which led to the architectural format of Erich Mendelsohn's later Berliner "Mosse-Haus" in 1921.
- Wassily Kandinsky resigns chairmanship of the Neue Künstlervereinigung München.
- Walter Gropius and Adolf Meyer build the Fagus Factory, Alfeld an der Leine.
- Der Blaue Reiter forms and has first exhibits in Munich and Berlin.

1912

- Hans Poelzig designs a chemical plant in Luban (now: Luboń, Poland), with strongly expressively articulated brick massing.
- Wassily Kandinsky publishes Über das Geistige in der Kunst ("Concerning the Spiritual in Art").
- Work of the Amsterdam School starts with the cooperative-commercial Scheepvaarthuis (Shipping House), designed by Johan van der Mey.

1913

- Michel de Klerk starts work on the first of three apartment buildings at Spaarndammerplantsoen, Amsterdam the last to be completed in 1921.
- Rudolf Steiner commences work on the first Goetheanum. Work is completed in 1919.
- Peder Vilhelm Jensen-Klint wins design competition for Grundtvig's Church in Copenhagen, Denmark.

1914

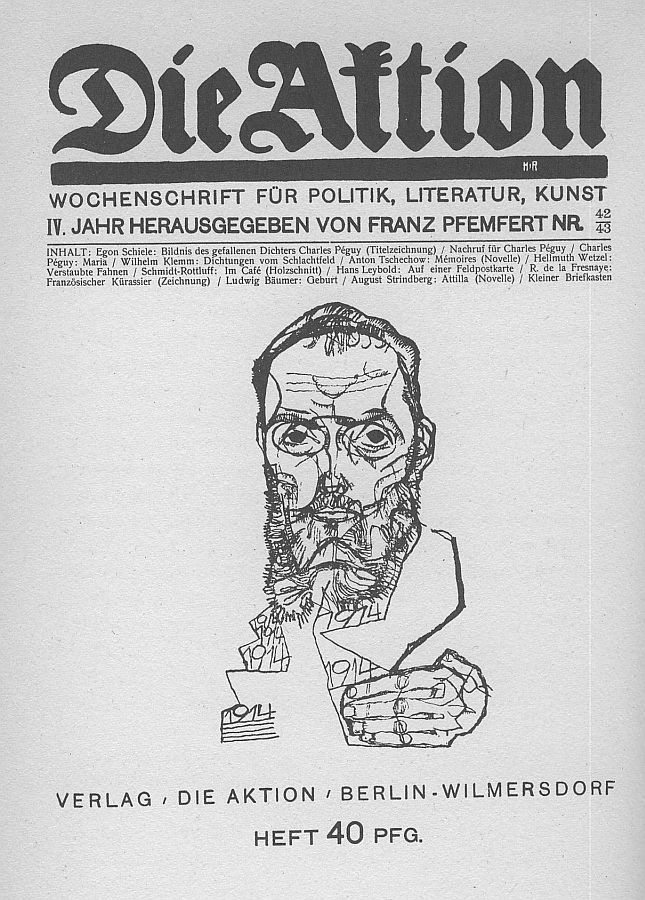
Front page of Die Aktion from 1914 with illustration by Egon Schiele

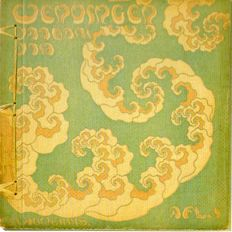
WENDINGEN 1918–1931, Dutch architecture and art magazine. Main theme: Expressionist architecture (Amsterdam School, de Klerk, Kramer, Mendelsohn, Finsterlin, Feininger et al.). Movement against "De Stijl" (Cubist architecture) in 1917.

- Paul Scheerbart publishes Glasarchitecktur
- Cologne Werkbund exhibition demonstrates ideological split between:
1. Normative form (Typisierung) – Behrens, Muthesius, and,
2. Individualists – Taut, van de Velde, Gropius

1915

- Death of Paul Scheerbart.
- Franz Kafka publishes The Metamorphosis.

1917

- Michel de Klerk starts building the Het Schip the third and most accomplished apartment buildings at Spaarndammerplantsoen, for the Eigen Haard development company in Amesterdam . Work is completed in 1921.
- Bruno Taut publishes Alpine architecture.

1918

- Adolf Behne expands the socio-cultural implications Scheerbarts writings about glass.
- Armistice – Republican revolution in Germany. Social Democrats form Workers and Soldiers Councils. General strikes.
- Free expression of the Amsterdam School elucidated in the Wendingen (Changes) magazine.
- November – Arbeitsrat für Kunst (Worker's Council for the Arts), founded by Bruno Taut and Adolf Behne. They model themselves consciously on the Soviets and attach a leftist programme to their Utopian and Expressionist activities. They demand; 1. A spiritual revolution to accompany the political one. 2. Architects to form ‘Corporations’ bound by ‘mutual aid’.
- November – Novembergruppe formed only to merge with Arbeitsrat für Kunst the following month. It proclaims; 1. Creation of collective art works. 2. Mass housing. 3. The destruction of artistically valueless monuments (This was a common reaction of the Avant Garde against the elitist militarism that was perceived as the cause of World War I).
- December – Arbeitsrat für Kunst declares its basic aims in Bruno Tauts Architeckturprogramm. It calls for a new 'total work of art', to be created with active participation of the people.
- Bruno Taut publishes Die Stadtkrone.

1919

- Spring manifesto of Arbeitsrat für Kunst is published. Art for the masses. Alliance of the arts under the wing of architecture. 50 artists, architects and patrons join led by Bruno Taut, Walter Gropius and Adolf Behne.
- April – Erich Mendelsohn, Hannes Meyer, Bernard Hoetger, Max Taut and Otto Bartning stage exhibition called 'An Exhibition of Unknown Architects'. Walter Gropius writes the introduction, now considered to be a first draft for the Bauhaus programme published later in the month. Called for a ‘Cathedral of the Future’, to unify the creative energy of society as in the Middle Ages.
- Bauhaus established and begins expressionist phase, to last until 1923.
- Adolf Behne publishes Ja! Stimmen des Arbeitsrates für Kunst in Berlin (Yes! Voices from the art Soviet in Berlin).
- Spartacist revolt ends the overt activities of Arbeitsrat für Kunst. The group starts the first Utopian letter of the Glass Chain by Bruno Taut. They are joined by previously peripheral architects; Hans Luckhardt, Wassili Luckhardt and Hans Scharoun. The letters demand; 1. Return to medieval integration of the building team. 2. Irregular form. 3. Facetted form. 4. Glass monuments.
- Opening of the Grosses Schauspielhaus by Hans Poelzig in Berlin. Hanging pendentive forms create a ‘luminous dissolution of form and space’.
- Bruno Taut launches the magazine Frühlicht (Early Light).
- Bruno Taut and Hans Scharoun stress the creative importance of the Freudian unconscious.
- Hans Poelzig is made chairman of the Deutscher Werkbund.
- Design work starts on Piet Kramers De Dageraad. Construction is completed in 1923. Mendelsohn see it as more structural than the work of Hendrikus Wijdeveld.

=== 1920 ===
- February 26, the film The Cabinet of Dr. Caligari premiered at the Marmorhaus in Berlin.
- Hans Poelzig declares affinity with the Glass Chain. He designs sets for The Golem.
- Solidarity of the Glass Chain is broken. Final letter written by Hermann Finsterlin. Hans Luckhardt recognises the incompatibility of free unconscious form and rationalist prefabrication and moves to Rationalism.
- Taut maintains his Scheerbartian views. He publishes ‘Die Auflösung der Städt' (The dissolution of the city) in line with Kropotkinian anarchist socialist tendencies. In common with the Soviets, it recommends the breakup of cities and a return to the land. He models agrarian communities and temples in the Alps. There would be 3 separate residential communities. 1. The enlightened. 2. Artists. 3. Children. This authoritarianism is noted in Frampton as although socialist in intent, paradoxically containing the seeds of the later fascism.

1921

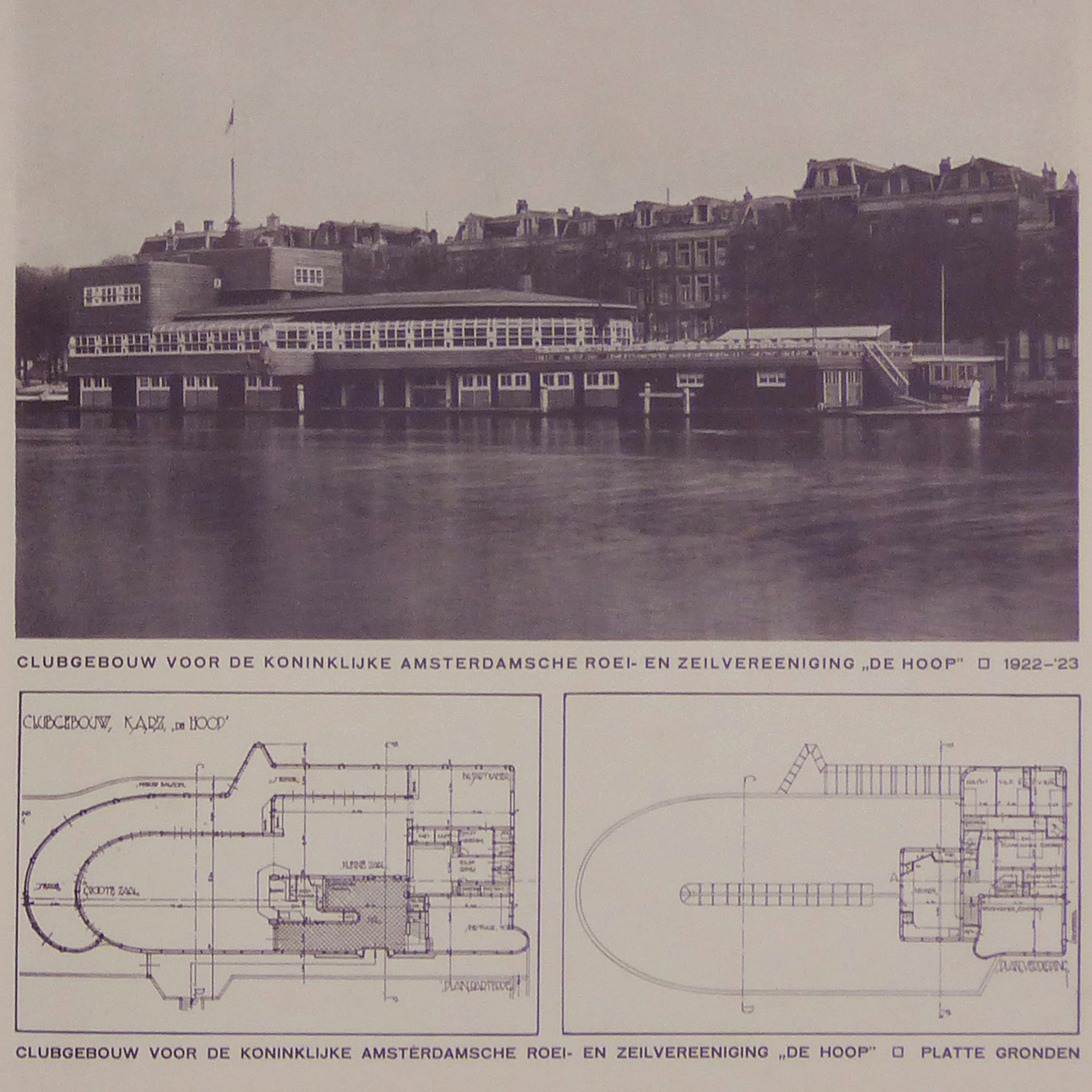
Clubhouse in Amsterdam 1923 (Michel de Klerk)

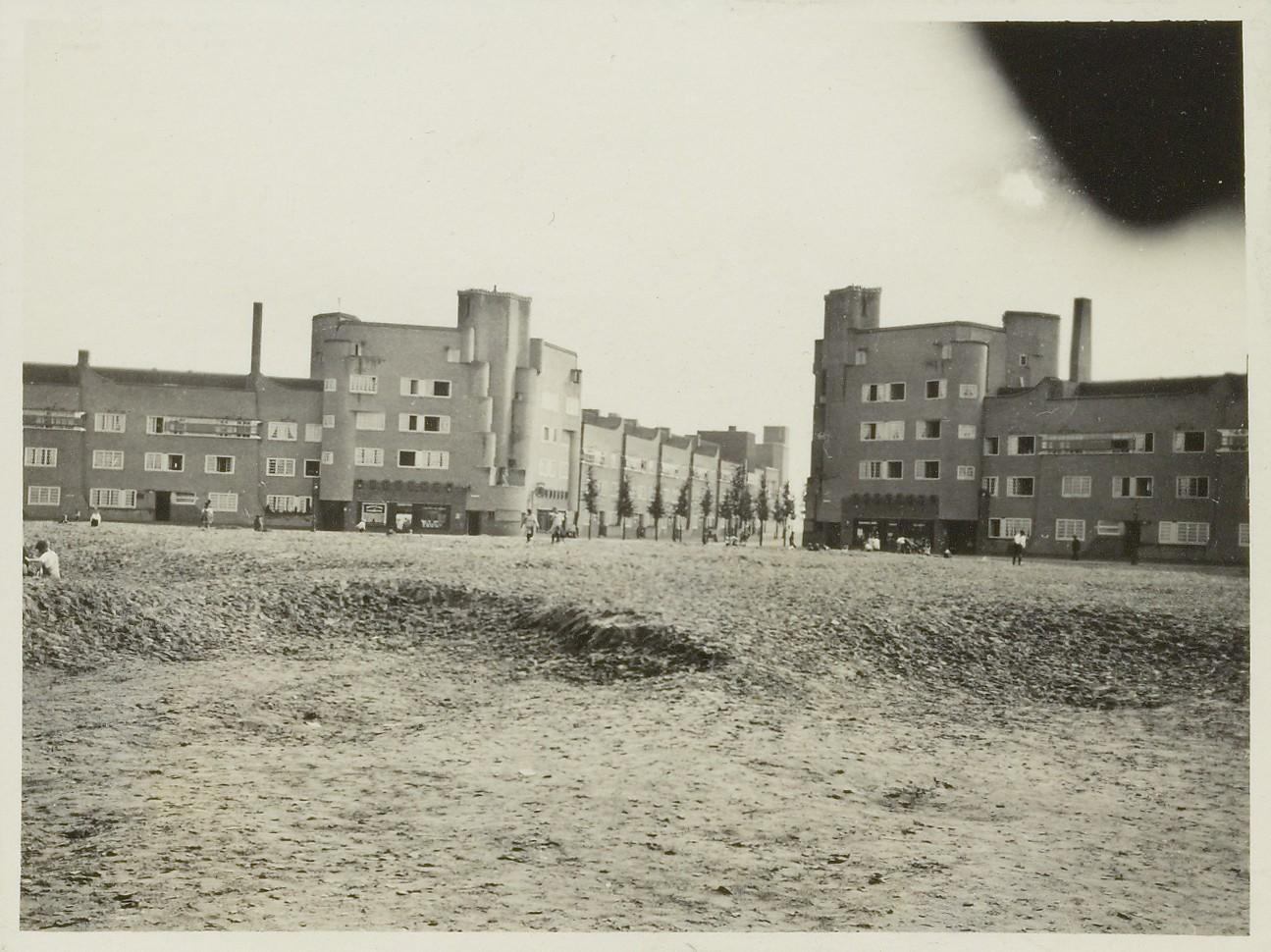
Amsterdam, Plan Zuid, PL-Takstraat, 1923. (Piet Kramer, high) (Michel de Klerk, low)

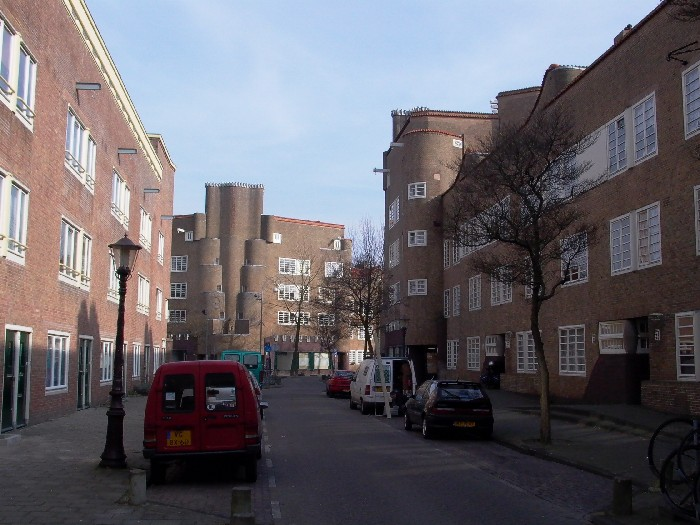
Amsterdam, Plan Zuid, PL-Takstraat, 1923. "Amsterdam, Mecca of Social Housing"

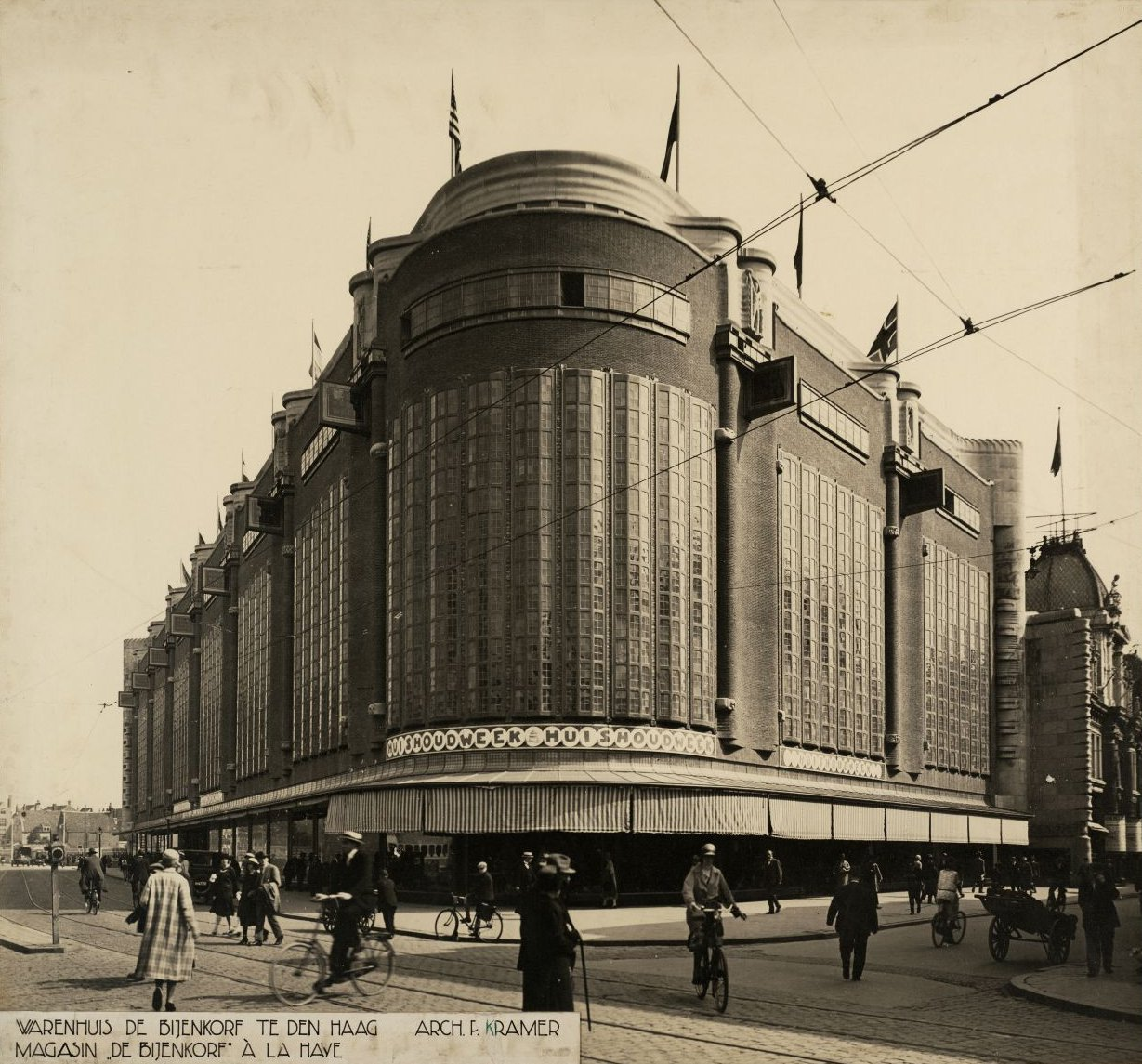
De Bijenkorf in The Hague, 1926 (Piet Kramer)

- Taut is made city architect of Magdeburg and fails to realise a municipal exhibition hall as the harsh economic realities of the Weimar Republic become apparent and prospects of building a ‘glass paradise’ dwindle.
- Walter Gropius designs the Monument to the March Dead in Weimar. It is completed in 1922 and inspires the workers' gong in the 1927 film Metropolis by Fritz Lang.
- Frühlicht loses its impetus.
- Erich Mendelsohn visits works of the Dutch Wendingen group and tours the Netherlands. He meets the rationalists J.J.P. Oud and W.M. Dudok. He recognises the conflict of visionary and objective approaches to design.
- Erich Mendelsohn's Mossehaus opens. Construction is complete on the Einstein Tower. It combines the sculptural forms of Van de Weldes Werkbund Exhibition theatre with the profile of Taut's Glashaus and the formal affinity to vernacular Dutch architecture of Eibink and Snellebrand and Hendrikus Wijdeveld. Einstein himself visits and declares it ‘organic’.
- Mendelsohn designs a hat factory in Luckenwalde. It shows influences of the Dutch expressionist De Klerk, setting dramatic tall pitched industrial forms against horizontal administrative elements. This approach is echoed in his Leningrad textile mill of 1925 and anticipates the banding in his department stores in Breslau, Stuttgart, Chemnitz and Berlin from 1927 and 1931.
- Hugo Häring and Ludwig Mies van der Rohe submit a competition entry for a Friedrichstrasse office building. It reveals an organic approach to structure and is fully made of glass.

1922

- Ludwig Mies van der Rohe publishes a glass skyscraper project in the last issue of Frühlicht.
- Toompea Castle is rebuilt for the Riigikogu in Tallinn, Estonia, as the only expressionist style parliamentary building in the world.
- The film Nosferatu by F.W. Murnau is released.

1923

- Bauhaus expressionist phase ends. Standard arguments for the reasons for this are 1. Expressionism was difficult to build. 2. Rampant inflation in Germany changed the climate of opinion to a more sober one. Jencks postulates that the standard arguments are too simplistic and instead argues that 1. Expressionism had become associated with extreme utopianism which in turn had been discredited by violence and bloodshed. Or 2. Architects had become convinced that the new (rationalist) style was equally expressive and more adequately captured the Zeitgeist. There is no large disagreements or public pronouncements to precipitate this change in direction. The only outwardly visible reaction was the forced resignation of the head of the basic Bauhaus course, Johannes Itten, to be replaced with the, then constructivist, László Moholy-Nagy.
- Chilehaus in Hamburg by Fritz Höger.
- Walter Gropius abandons expressionism and moves to rationalism.
- Bruno and Max Taut begin work on government funded low cost housing projects.
- Berlin secession exhibition. Mies van der Rohe and Hans and Wassili Luckhardt demonstrate a more functional and objective approach.
- Rudolf Steiner designs second Goetheanum after first was destroyed by fire in 1922. Work commences 1924 and is completed in 1928.
- Michel de Klerk dies.

1924

- Germany adopts the Dawes Plan. Architects more inclined to produce low-cost housing than pursue utopian ideas about glass.
- Hugo Häring designs a farm complex. It uses expressive pitched roofs contrasted with bulky tectonic elements and rounded corners.
- Hugo Häring designs Prinz Albrecht Garten, residential project. Whilst demonstrating overt expressionism he is preoccupied with deeper inquiries into the inner source of form.
- Foundation of Zehnerring group.
- June 3, Death of Franz Kafka.
- Hermann Finsterlin initiates a series of correspondence with Antoni Gaudí.

1925

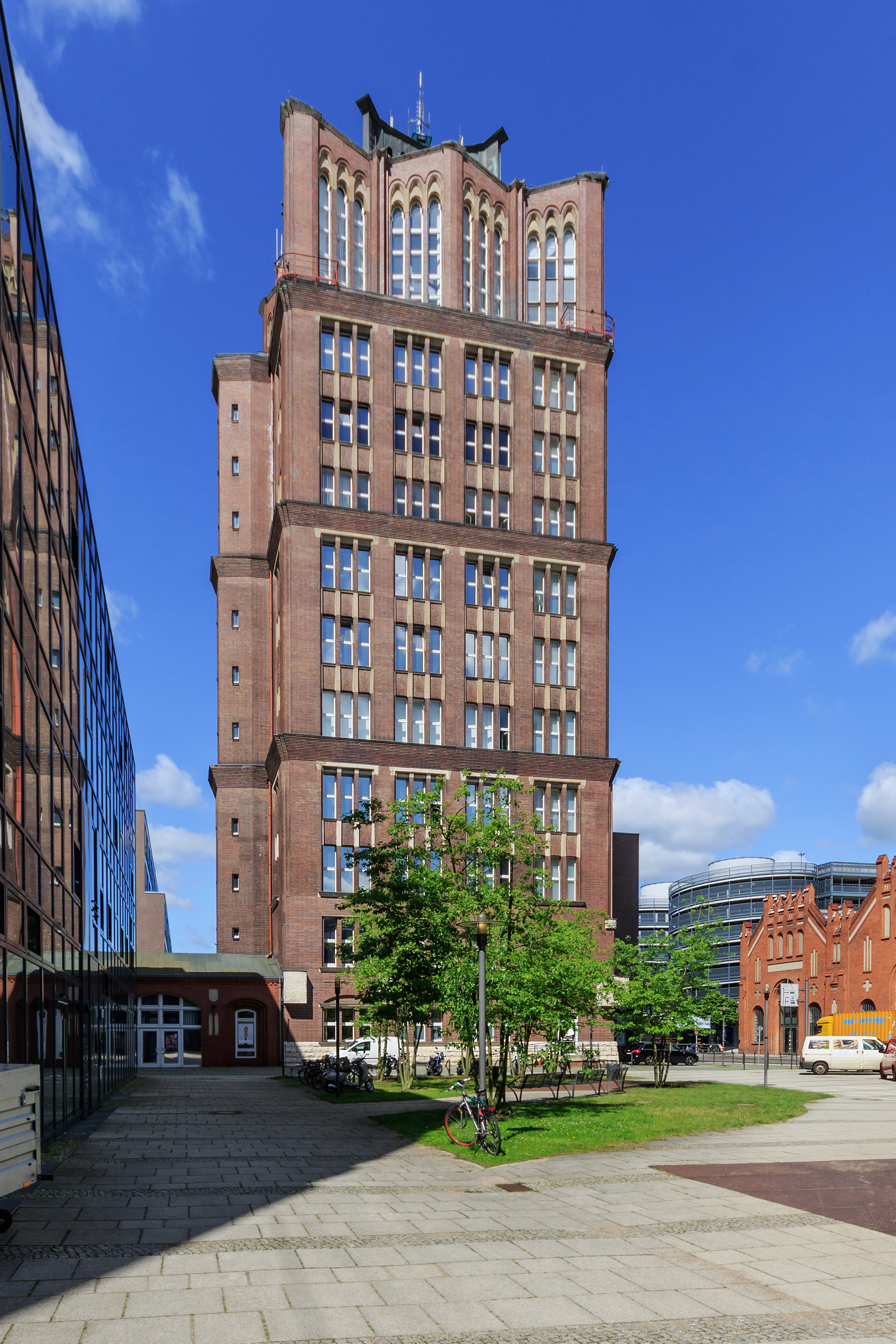
Borsig-Tower in Berlin-Tegel, 1925 (Eugen Schmohl)

- Hans Poelzig abandons expressionism and returns to crypto-classicism.
- Zehnerring group becomes Der Ring. Hugo Häring is appointed secretary.
- Max Brod publishes Franz Kafka's The Trial
- Eugen Schmohl completes the Borsig-Tower in Berlin-Tegel

1926

- Founding of the architectural collective Der Ring largely turns its back on expressionism and towards a more functionalist agenda.
- Wassily Kandinsky publishes Point and Line to Plane.
- Max Brod publishes Franz Kafka's The Castle

1927

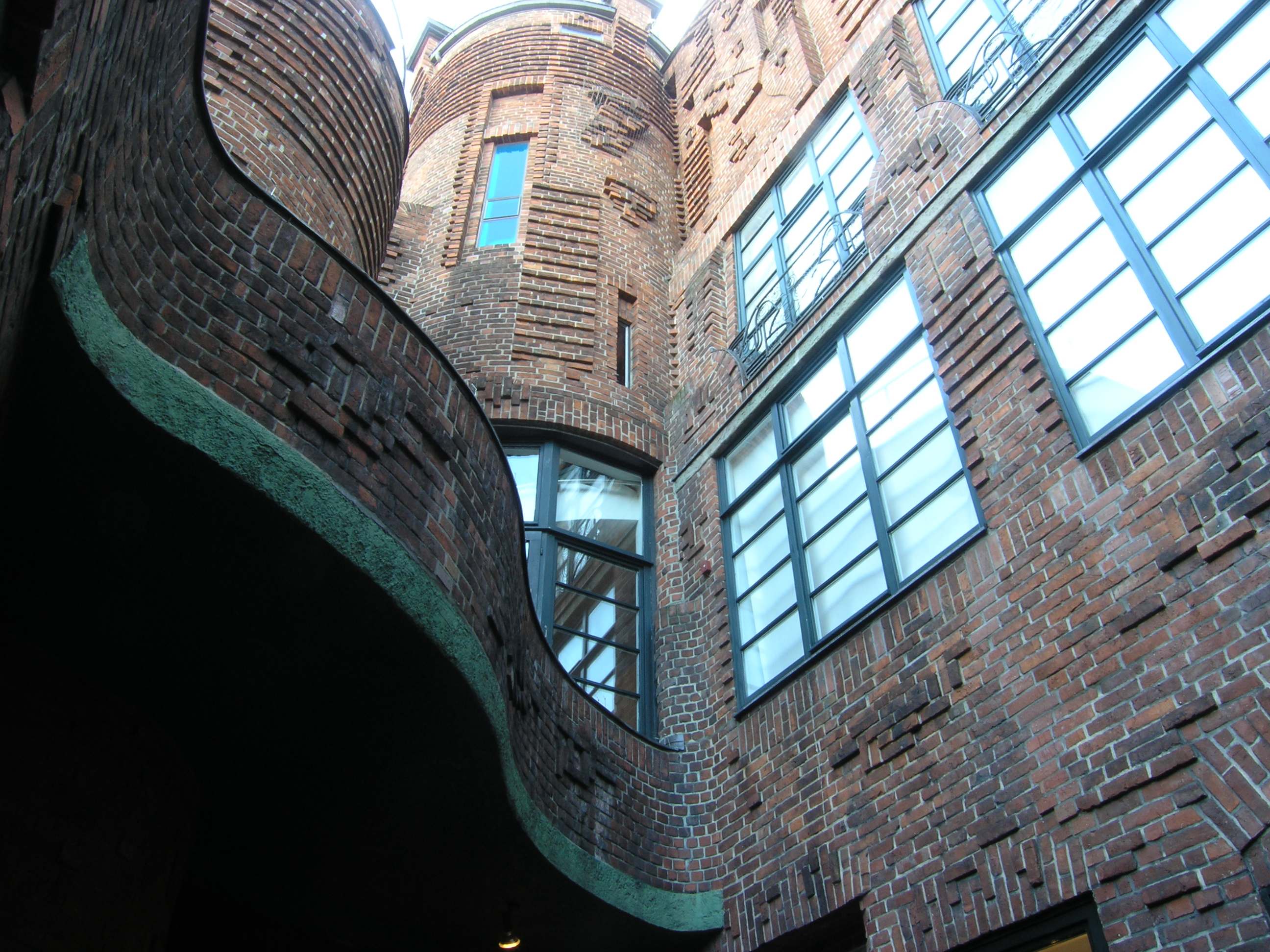
Böttcherstrasse in Bremen, 1927 (Bernhard Hoetger)

- Anzeiger-Hochhaus, Hannover by Fritz Höger
- Grundtvig's Church, Bispebjerg by Peder Vilhelm Jensen-Klint
- Release of Fritz Lang's Metropolis.
- Weissenhof Estate is built in Stuttgart. Expressionist architects, Taut, Poelzig, Scharoun, build in international style.

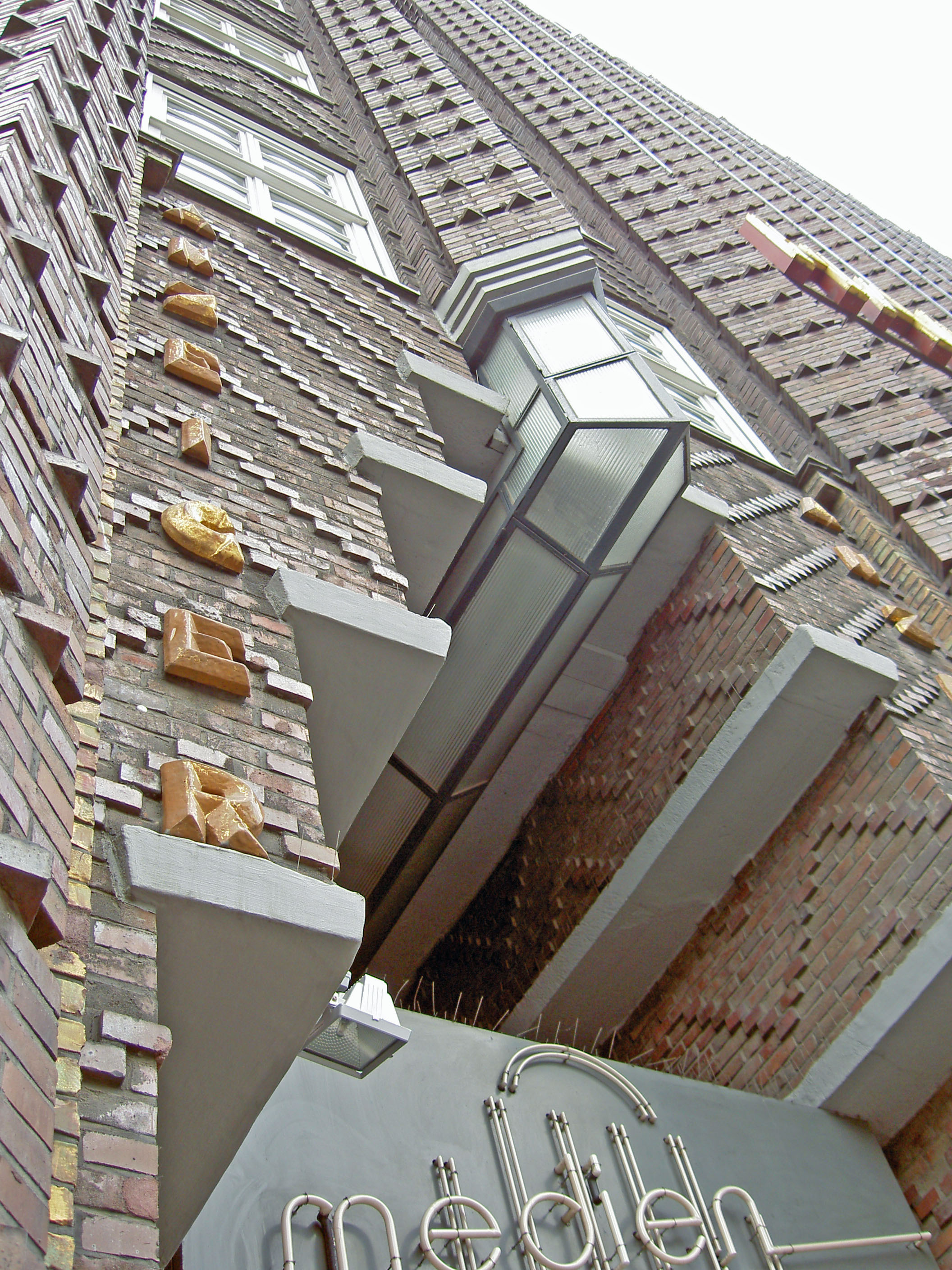
Anzeiger-Hochhaus in Hannover, 1927 (Fritz Höger)

1928

- Congrès International d'Architecture Moderne (CIAM) convenes in Switzerland. Hugo Häring fails to move consensus away from Le Corbusier's call for rationalism towards an organic approach. Finally the Scheerbartian vision is eclipsed as the non-normative ‘place’ orientated approach is cast aside.
- The Großmarkthalle at Frankfurt (by Martin Elsaesser) is completed.
- Chapel of the Cemetery of Glienicke/Nordbahn (Germany) is completed. Architect: Paul Poser

=== 1930 ===
- Completion of Europahaus (Leipzig)

1931

- Completion of 'The house of Atlantis' in Böttcherstraße (Bremen).

1938

- After Nazi seizure of power, expressionist art was outlawed as degenerate art.

1937

- Design of Hallgrímskirkja in Reykjavík, Iceland by Guðjón Samúelsson.

=== 1940 ===
- The Berlin Philharmonic concert hall is destroyed in 1944 during World War II.

=== 1950 ===
- Le Corbusier constructs Notre Dame du Haut signaling his postmodern return to an architectural expressionism of form. He also constructs the Unité d'Habitation, which emphasizes the architectural expression of materials. The Brutalist use of béton brut (reinforced concrete) recalls the expressionist use of glass, brick, and steel.

=== 1960 ===
- Expressionism reborn without the political context as Fantastic architecture.
- Rebuilding of the Berlin Philharmonic in 1963 by Hans Scharoun.
- Church of The Highway by Giovanni Michelucci is inaugurated in Italy.

== Expressionist architects of the 1920s ==
- Adolf Behne
- Víctor Eusa
- Hermann Finsterlin
- Antoni Gaudí
- Walter Gropius – early period
- Hugo Häring
- Fritz Höger
- Bernhard Hoetger
- Michel de Klerk
- Piet Kramer
- Carl Krayl
- Erich Mendelsohn
- Hans Poelzig
- Hans Scharoun
- Rudolf Steiner
- Bruno Taut

== Legacy ==
The legacy of Expressionist architecture extended to later movements in the twentieth century. Early expressionism is heavily influenced by Art Nouveau and can be considered part of its legacy, while post 1910 and including Amsterdam School it is considered adjacent to Art Deco. The New Objectivity (Neue Sachlichkeit) art movement arose in direct opposition to Expressionism. Expressionistic architecture today is an evident influence in Deconstructivism, the work of Santiago Calatrava, and the organic movement of Blobitecture.

Another movement that grew out of expressionism to become a school in its own right is Metaphoric architecture, which includes elements of biomorphism and Zoomorphic architecture. The style is very much influenced by the form and geometry of the natural world and is characterised by the use of analogy and metaphor as the primary inspiration and directive for design. Perhaps the most prominent voice of the Metaphoric architectural school at present is Dr. Basil Al Bayati whose designs have been inspired by trees and plants, snails, whales, insects, dervishes and even myth and literature. He is also the founder of the International School of Metaphoric Architecture in Málaga, Spain.

Many of the founders and significant players in Expressionist architecture were also important in modern architecture. Examples are Bruno Taut, Hans Scharoun, Walter Gropius, and Mies van der Rohe. By 1927 Gropius, Taut, Scharoun and Mies were all building in the International Style and participated in the Weissenhof Estate. Gropius and Mies are better known for their modernist work, but Gropius' Monument to the March Dead, and Mies' Friedrichstrasse office building projects are basic works of Expressionist architecture. Le Corbusier started his career in modern architecture but took a turn for a more expressionist manner later in life.

== Bibliography ==
- Breitschmid, Markus (2017). "Alpine Architecture – Bruno Taut", in: Disegno – Quarterly Journal for Design, No. 14, London (Spring 2017), pp. 62–70.
- Rauhut, Christoph and Lehmann, Niels (2015). Fragments of Metropolis Berlin, Hirmer Publishers 2015, ISBN 978-3777422909
- Stissi, Vladimir (2007). Amsterdam, het mekka van de volkshuisvesting, 1909-1942 (Amsterdam, the Mecca of Social Housing, 1909-1942), Dutch language, more than 500 ill., NAi Rotterdam.
- Frampton, Kenneth (2004). Modern architecture - a critical history, Third edition, World of Art, ISBN 0-500-20257-5
- Benson, Timothy. O. (); et al. (2001-09-17). Expressionist Utopias: Paradise, Metropolis, Architectural Fantasy (Weimar and Now: German Cultural Criticism). University of California Press. ISBN 0-520-23003-5.
- Bullock, Alan; Stallybrass, Oliver; Trombley, Stephen, eds. (1988). The Fontana Dictionary of Modern Thought (Paperback). Fontana press. p. 918 pages. ISBN 0-00-686129-6.
- Jencks, Charles (1986). Modern Movements in Architecture, Second edition, Penguin, ISBN 0-14-009963-8
- Whyte, Iain Boyd ed. (1985). Crystal Chain Letters: Architectural Fantasies by Bruno Taut and His Circle, The MIT Press, ISBN 0-262-23121-2
- Bletter, Rosemarie Haag (Summer 1983). "Expressionism and the New Objectivity", in: Art Journal, 43:2 (Summer 1983), pp. 108–120.
- Bletter, Rosemarie Haag (March 1981). "The Interpretation of the Glass Dream: Expressionist Architecture and the History of the Crystal Metaphor, in: JSAH (Journal of the Society of Architectural Historians), vol. 40, no. 1 (March 1981): 20–43.
- Pehnt, Wolfgang (1973). Expressionist Architecture, Thames and Hudson, ISBN 0-500-34058-7
- Banham, Reyner (1972). Theory and Design in the First Machine Age, Third edition, Praeger Publishers Inc., ISBN 0-85139-632-1
- Sharp, Dennis (1966). Modern Architecture and Expressionism, George Braziller New York, OCLC 180572
