= Berend Tobia Boeyinga =

Dutch architect

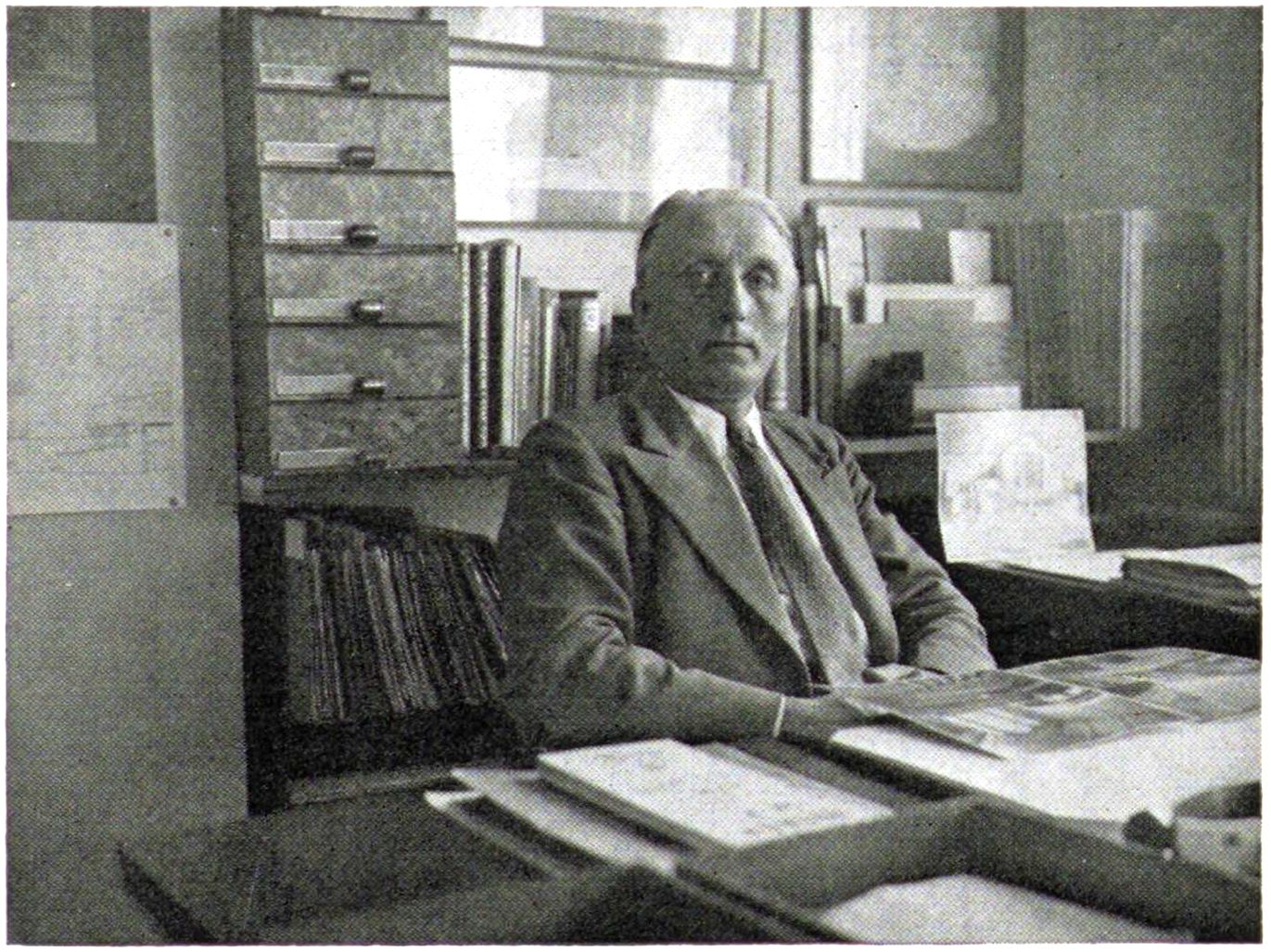
Berend Tobia Boeyinga

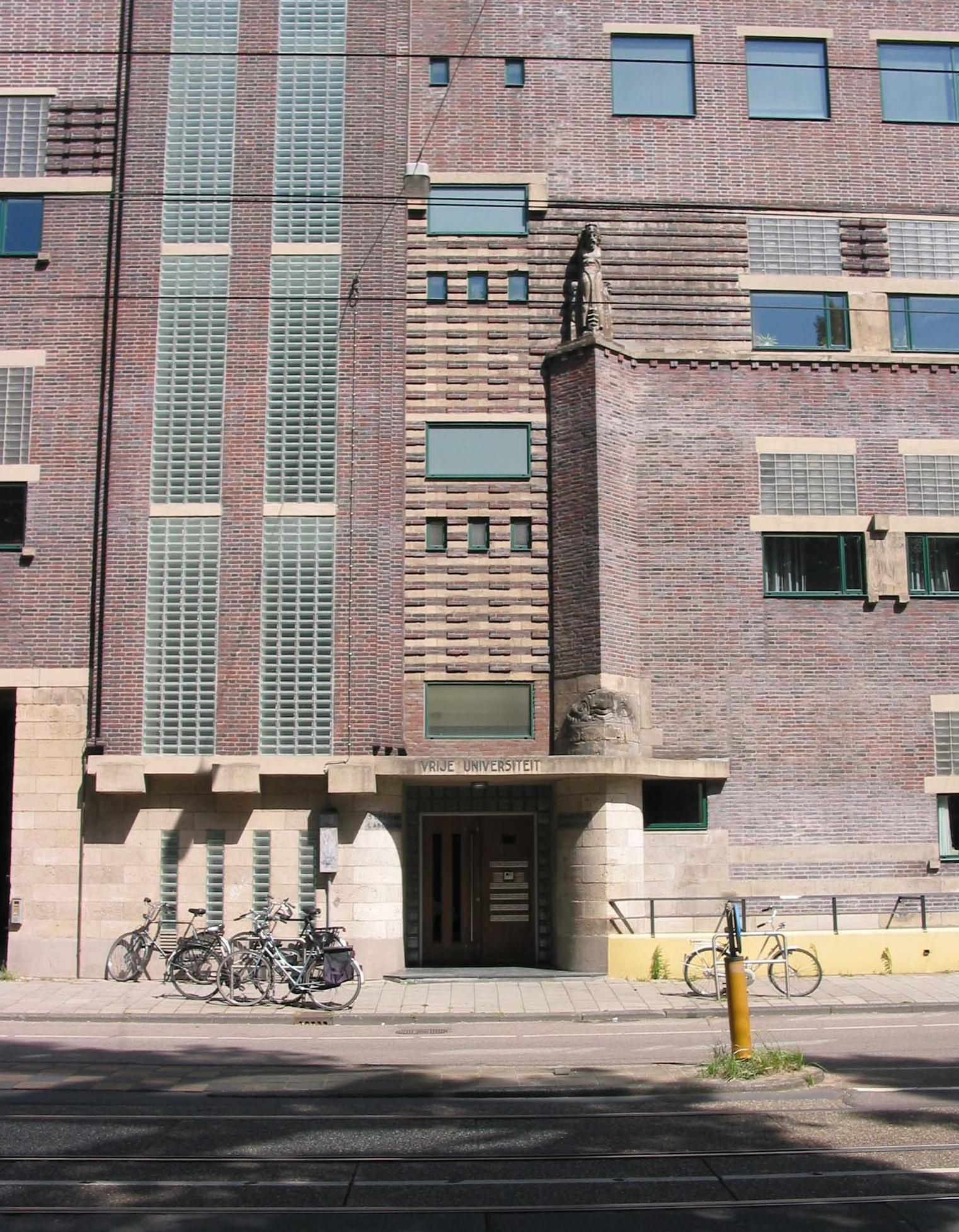
Facade of the laboratory building of the Vrije Universiteit Amsterdam

Berend Tobia Boeyinga (Noord-Scharwoude, 27 March 1886 - Amsterdam, 6 November 1969) was a Dutch architect noted for his Calvinist church buildings and as a practicing member of the Amsterdam School.

== Life ==
Boeyinga was the son of a Calvinist minister. Boeyinga started his training as a carpenter and then as a draughtsman and a foreman. From 1909 until 1919 he studied in Amsterdam to become an architect. In this period he worked for two years at the office of Eduard Cuypers. Cuypers gave the architects working in his office considerable autonomy and Boeyinga, Johan van der Mey, Piet Kramer and Michel de Klerk, all of whom were more experimental than Cuypers himself, established the principle of what would later become known as the Amsterdam School, while working there. Boeyinga then went on to work for Charles Estourgie and, from 1917 to 1921, for Michel de Klerk. During this period Boeyinga oversaw the construction of De Klerk's famous housing complexes at the Spaarndammerplantsoen in Amsterdam.

After the completion of his studies with a massive design for a government building in Amsterdam, the director of the municipal housing service, ir. Arie Keppler, asked Boeyinga to design new garden villages in Amsterdam-Noord, known today as Tuindorp Oostzaan and Tuindorp Nieuwendam. These projects are now considered highlights of Amsterdam school architecture, of which they represent a rural variant.

Not satisfied with the relative anonymity of his work as a municipal civil servant, and insufficiently harnassed against the developments in Amsterdam which would marginalise the municipal housing service, Boeyinga established himself as an independent architect in 1926. That year he built his first church, the Kloppersingelkerk in Haarlem, based on a design he had entered in a competition for a new Calvinist church in Amsterdam in 1923. The church was designed according to the ideas of Abraham Kuyper, leader of the denomination Boeyinga was a member of. The space had a fan-shaped floorplan with the pulpit at the centre. Stylistically the church was closely related to the Amsterdam School. There was some controversy about the inclusion of statues at the entrance of Protestant leaders like Martin Luther, John Calvin and Kuyper. Since the church on 23 March 2003 was entirely destroyed by a dramatic fire, these statues are all that remain of the building. Although Boeyinga designed many more churches, the complexity of the Kloppersingelkerk was never repeated.

For the Vrije university in Amsterdam he built the famous laboratories in the 1930s. In that period he became involved in the training of architects, first as a teacher, later as the head of a school for architecture in Amsterdam. After the Second World War he was involved in restoration work, among others the Cuneratoren in Rhenen and The Eusebiuskerk in Arnhem, both heavily damaged during the war.

== Buildings (selected) ==
- Garden village Oostzaan, Zonneplein Amsterdam-Noord, 1921–1924
- Garden village Nieuwendam, Purmerplein / weg Amsterdam-Noord, 1923–1926
- Church, Kloppersingel (destroyed 2003) Haarlem, 1926–1927
- Church Bergen (NH), 1926–1927
- Church Bergen op Zoom, 1927–1928
- VU Laboratories Vrije Universiteit Amsterdam, 1930–1932
- Goederherderkerk in IJsselmuiden, 1933- currently
- Restoration Cunera-church Rhenen, 1940–1963
- Restoration Eusebius-church Arnhem, 1946–1961
- Pniël-church, Amsterdam, 1954

== Images of the Koningkerk (Kloppersingel, Haarlem) ==
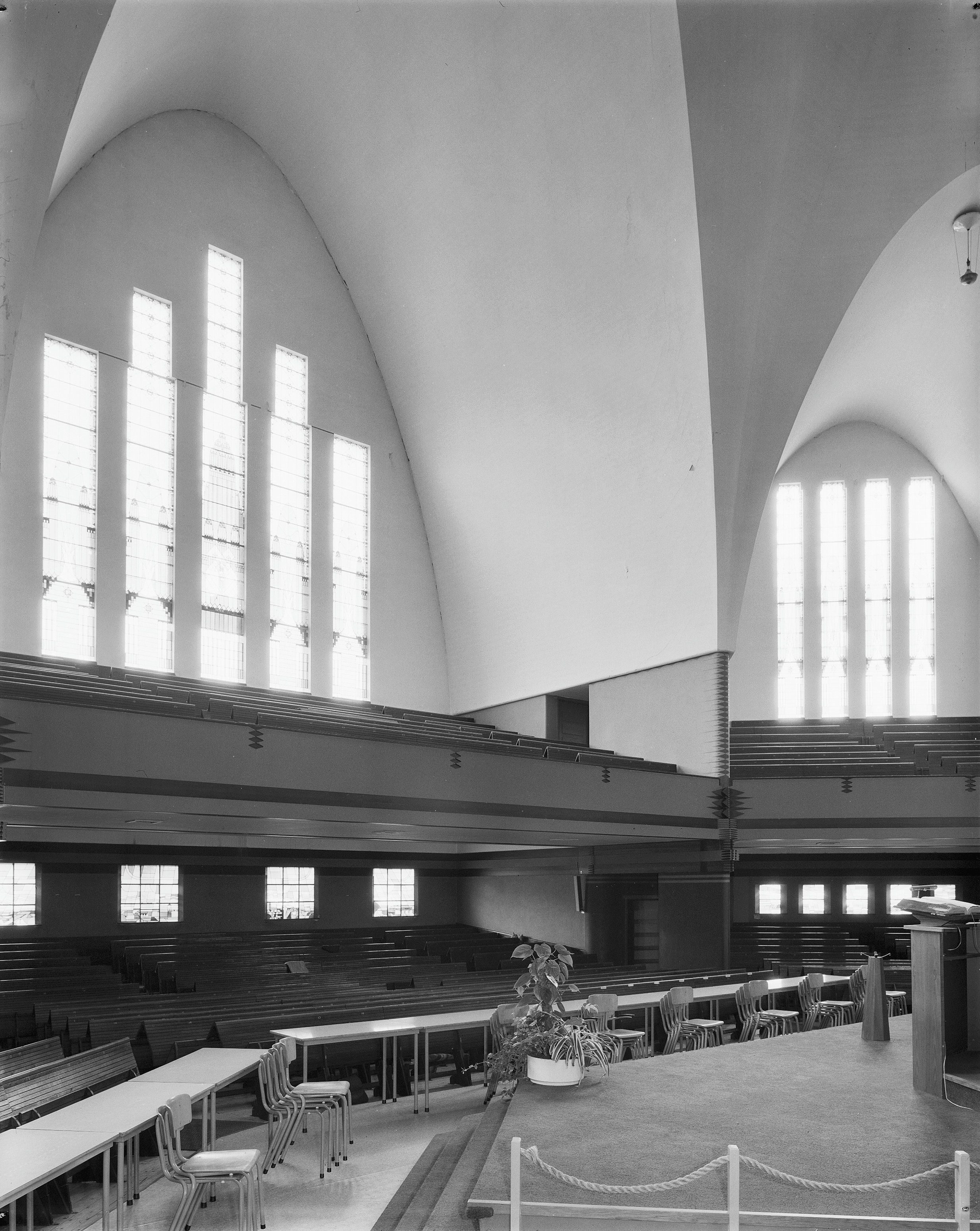

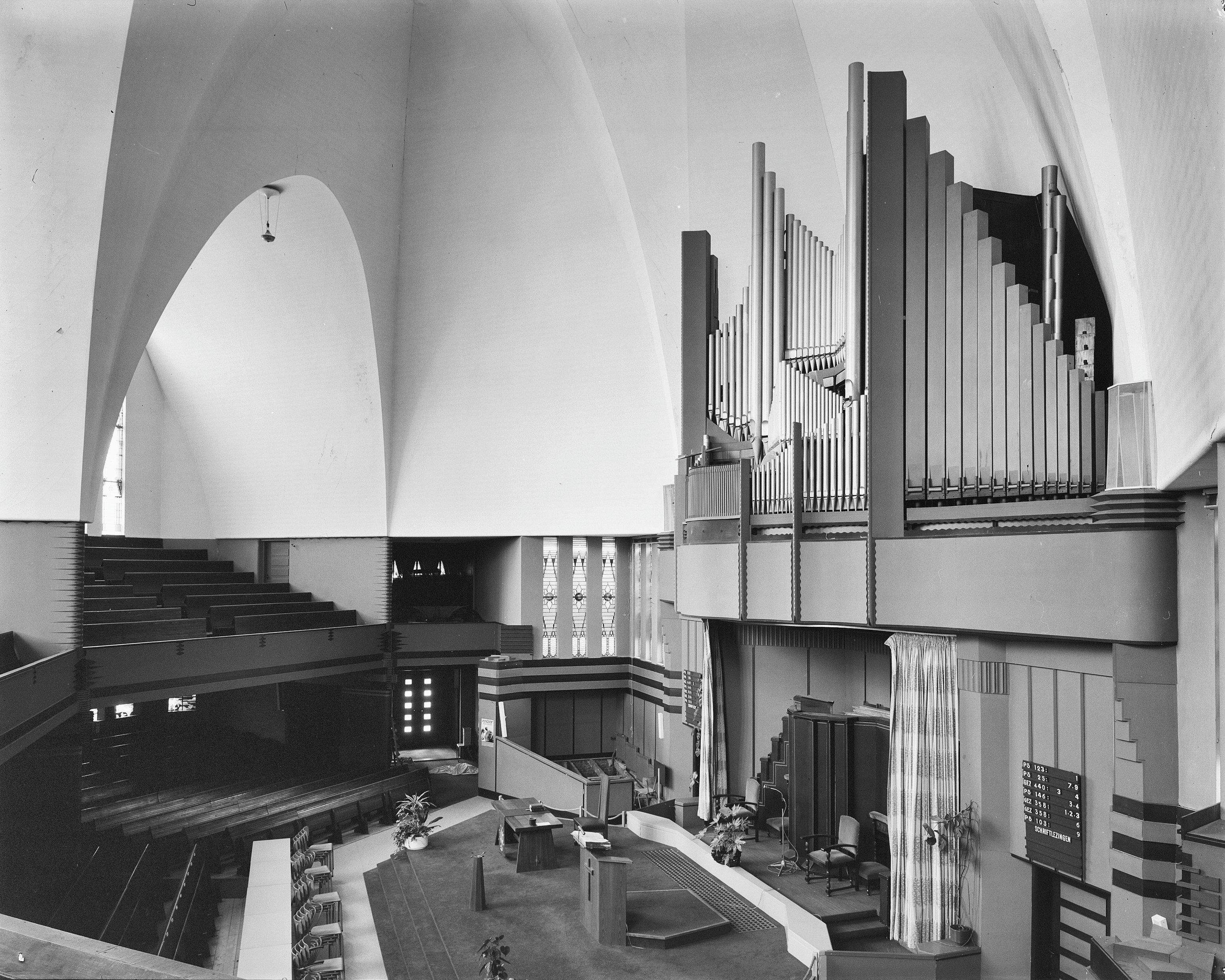
Photographs by Gerard Dukker (RCE, 1979)

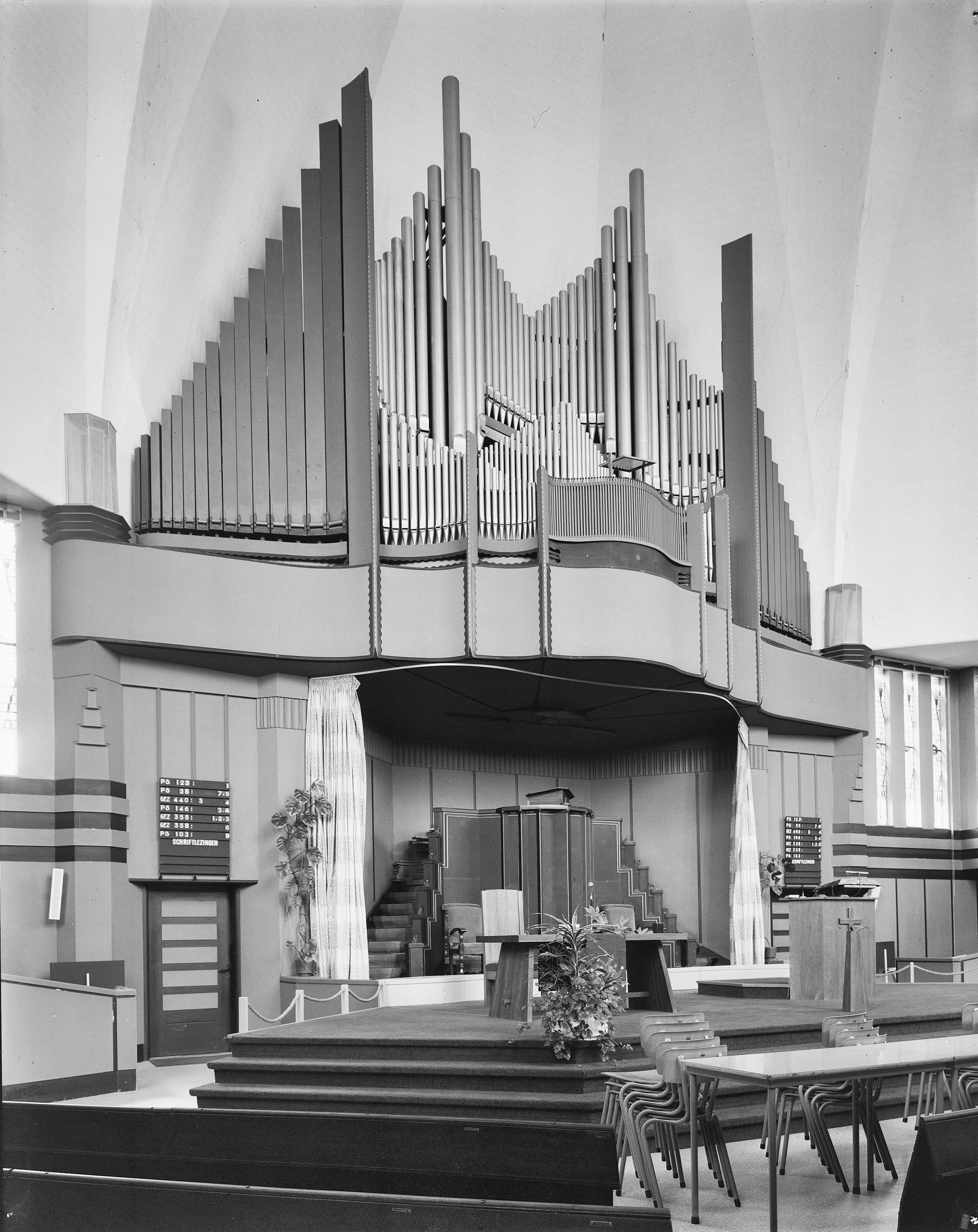
