= Grasbroek =

Coordinates: 50.897050°N 5.975844°E

Map of the municipality Heerlen, showing the neighbourhood Grasbroek in red, which is part of the quarter Schandelen-Grasbroek in light red.

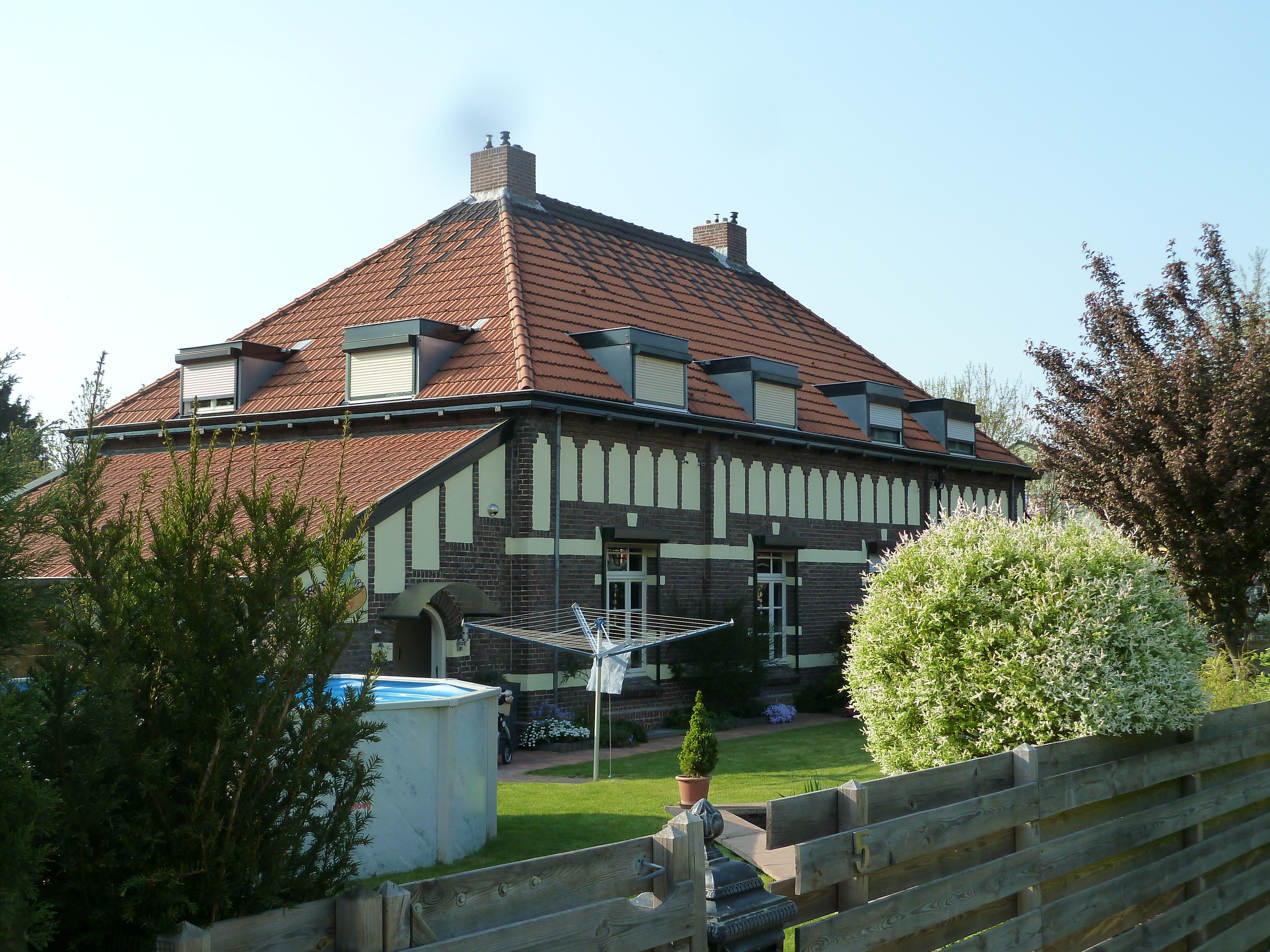
Typical house of the neighbourhood at Grasbroek 5–7, marked as national monument number 21223

Grasbroek is a neighbourhood and former mining colony in the municipality Heerlen, Netherlands. The neighbourhood was built to serve the mine Oranje-Nassau I.

Grasbroek houses the Patronaatsgebouw (Jos Wielders (1883–1949)), build in 1920 it is one of the earliest examples of Amsterdam School outside Amsterdam. Besides being in a state of disrepair all almost all original elements remain. Currently it is being restored, costing around 3,500,000 euros.
