= Het Schip =

Museum in Amsterdam, the Netherlands

Museum Het Schip
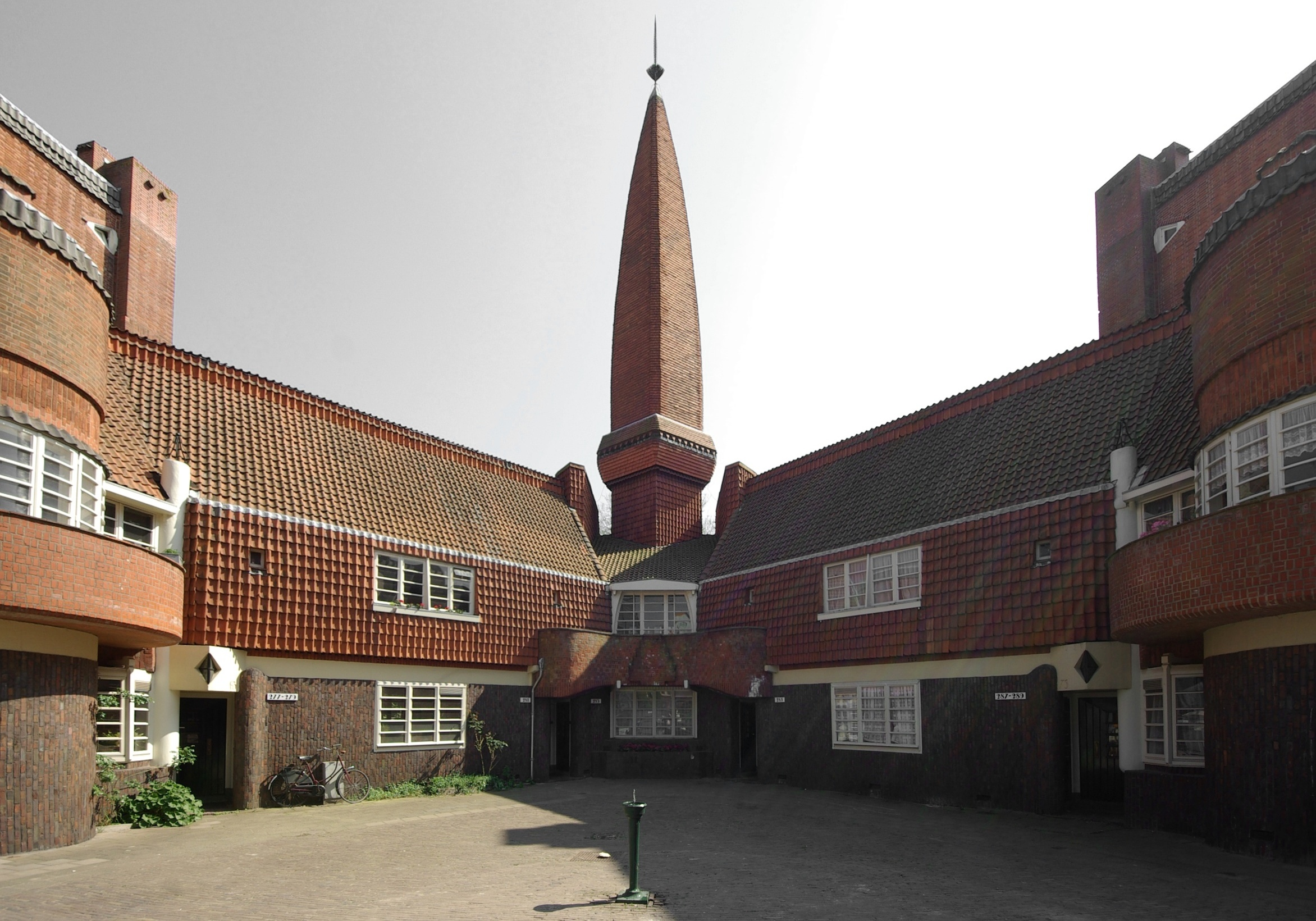
- Het Schip by Michel de Klerk, 1917–20

- Location in Amsterdam
- Established: 2001
- Location: Oostzaanstraat 45; Amsterdam, the Netherlands
- Coordinates: 52.3903°N 4.8735°E
- Visitors: 19.455 (2014)
- Director: Alice Roegholt
- Website: www.hetschip.nl/en

Het Schip (English: The Ship) is a building complex in the Spaarndammerbuurt neighbourhood of Amsterdam, the Netherlands. The complex in the architectural style of the Amsterdam School was designed by Michel de Klerk in 1919. It originally contained 102 homes (now 82) for the working class, a small meeting hall, a post office, and an elementary school. Since 2001, the former school and post office are used as a museum about the Amsterdam School.

== Historical background ==
In the 19th and early 20th century, Amsterdam faced a major housing shortage, with many working-class people living in cramped quarters with no electricity or running water. Heating was usually provided by burning peat, and poor families often lived in a single room together.

In response to these squalid conditions, the Dutch government passed the National Housing Act (Woningwet) in 1901. This law set up much higher standards for housing and resulted in both the demolition of older, inadequate tenement buildings and the creation of new housing blocks with much better living conditions and prices that made them accessible to Amsterdam's poorer citizens. The new law also set aside financial resources for the development of low-income housing. One of the affordable housing developments created in the wake of the passage of the National Housing Act was the Spaarndammerbuurt, where Het Schip and several other Amsterdam School social housing projects are located.

Much of the new low-income housing was financed by cooperative housing associations run by groups such as workers' collectives, socialist organizations, religious groups. One such group was Eigen Haard, or "our own hearth," a socialist group that commissioned Michel de Klerk to design and build three blocks of proletarian housing, including Het Schip.

== Amenities ==
The apartments of Het Schip were a radical departure from the poor living conditions of many of Amsterdam's working-class people in the 20th century. Relatively spacious, they include several separate rooms as opposed to the one-room dwellings still common at the time. They also included flush toilets and had ample natural light and ventilation from windows. Ground-floor apartments also had gardens.

The building also includes a post office, which the poor had previously had little access to. The post office contained a telephone box from which families could make calls.

== Gallery ==
=== Exterior and collection ===
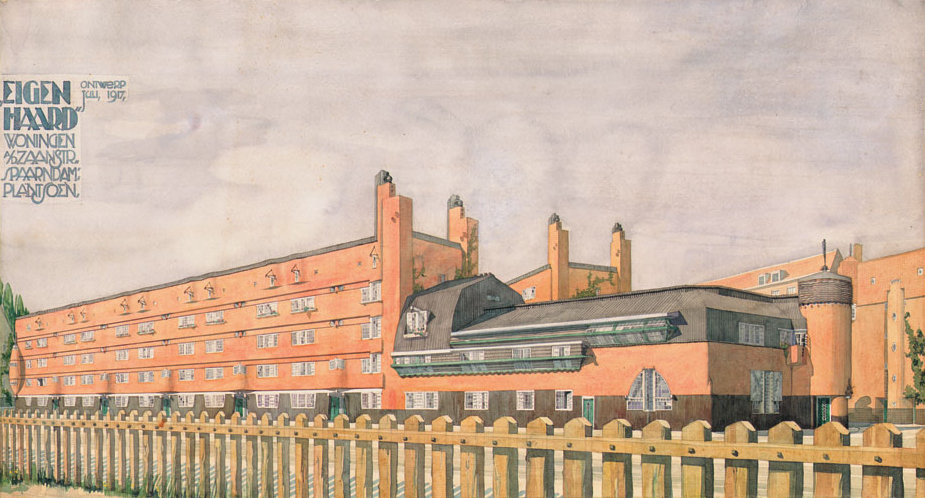
Perspective drawing by Michel de Klerk, 1917

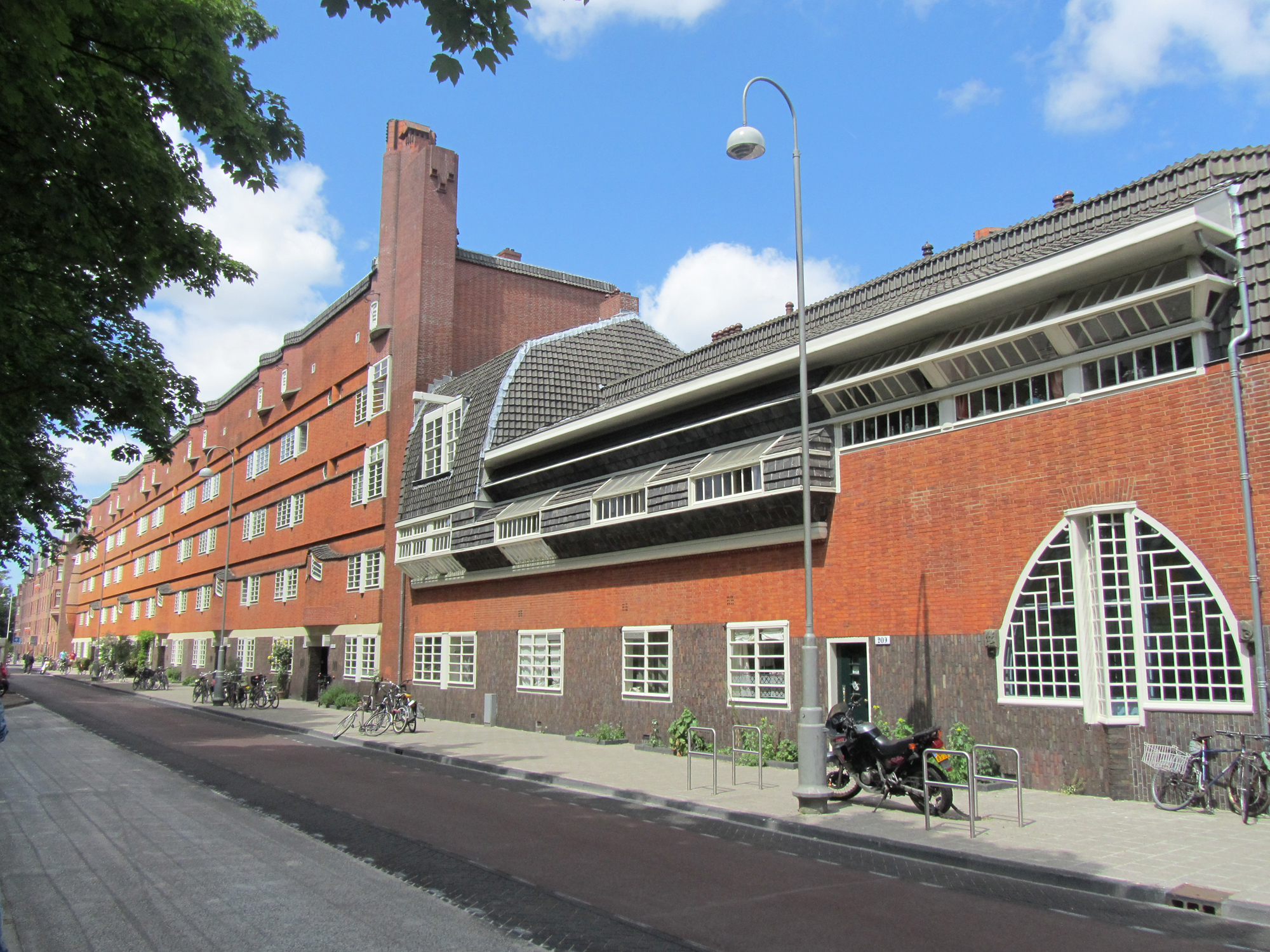
Southern facade with design windows

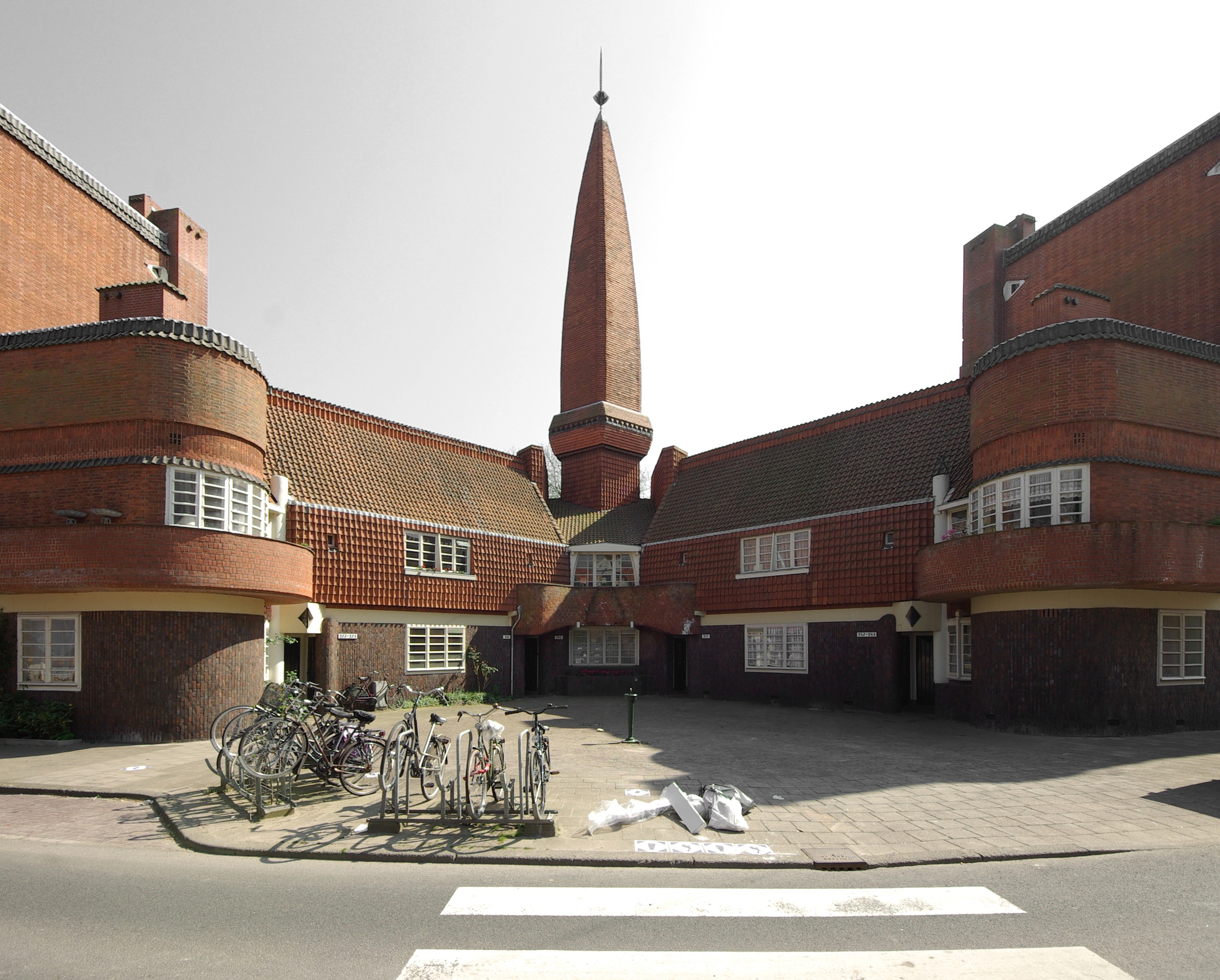
Tower

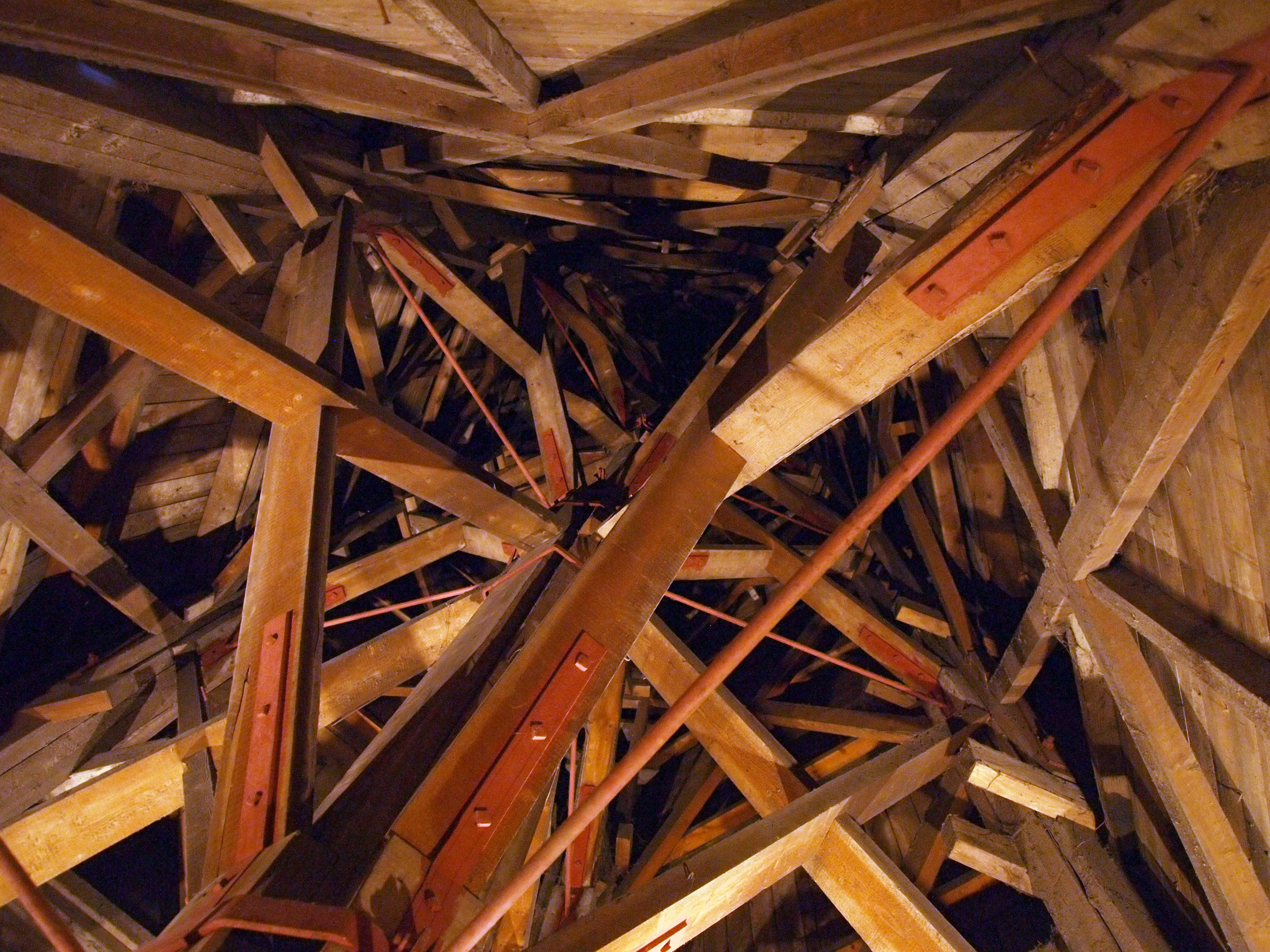
Tower interior

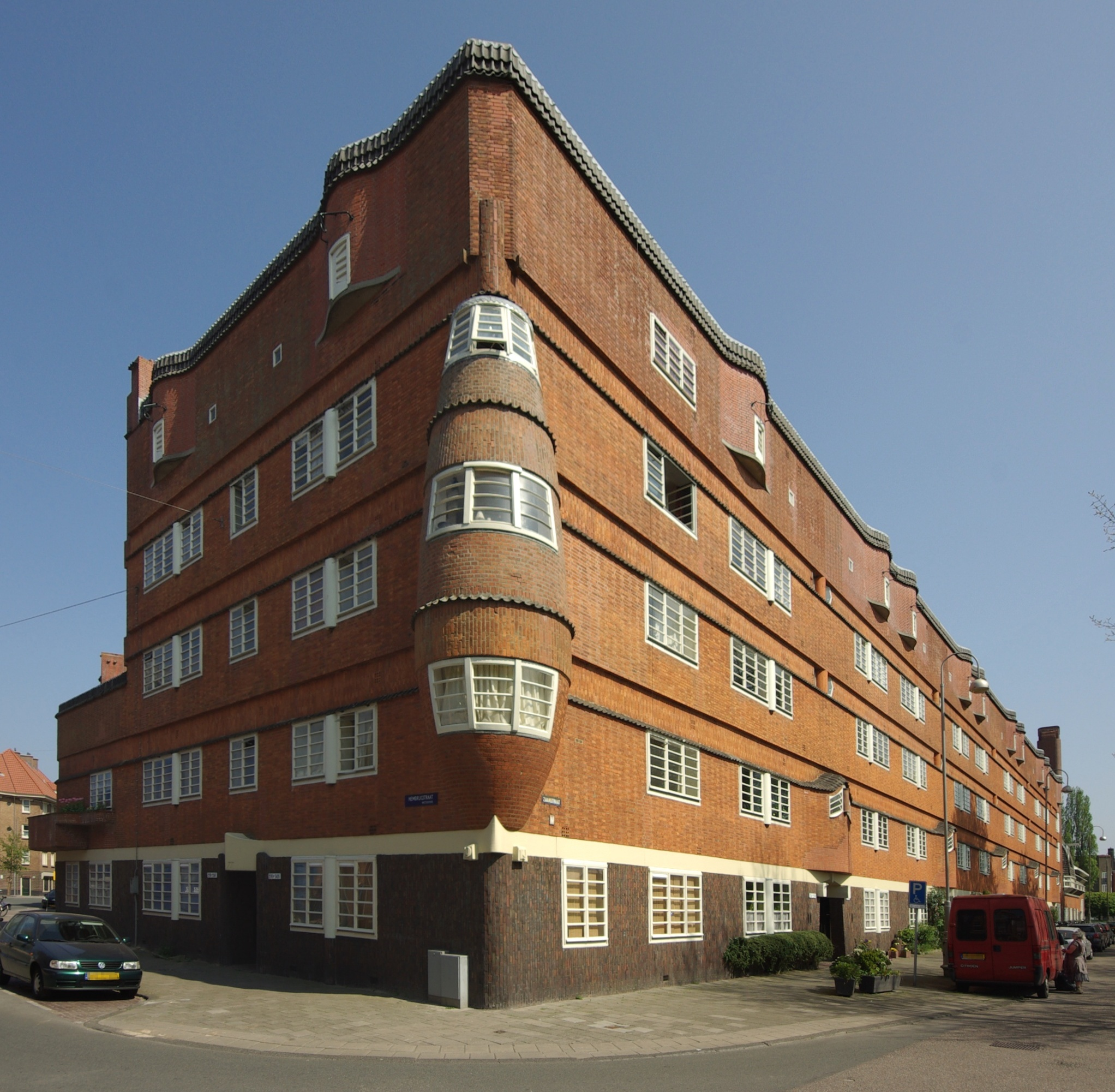
Hembrugstraat-Zaanstraat corner

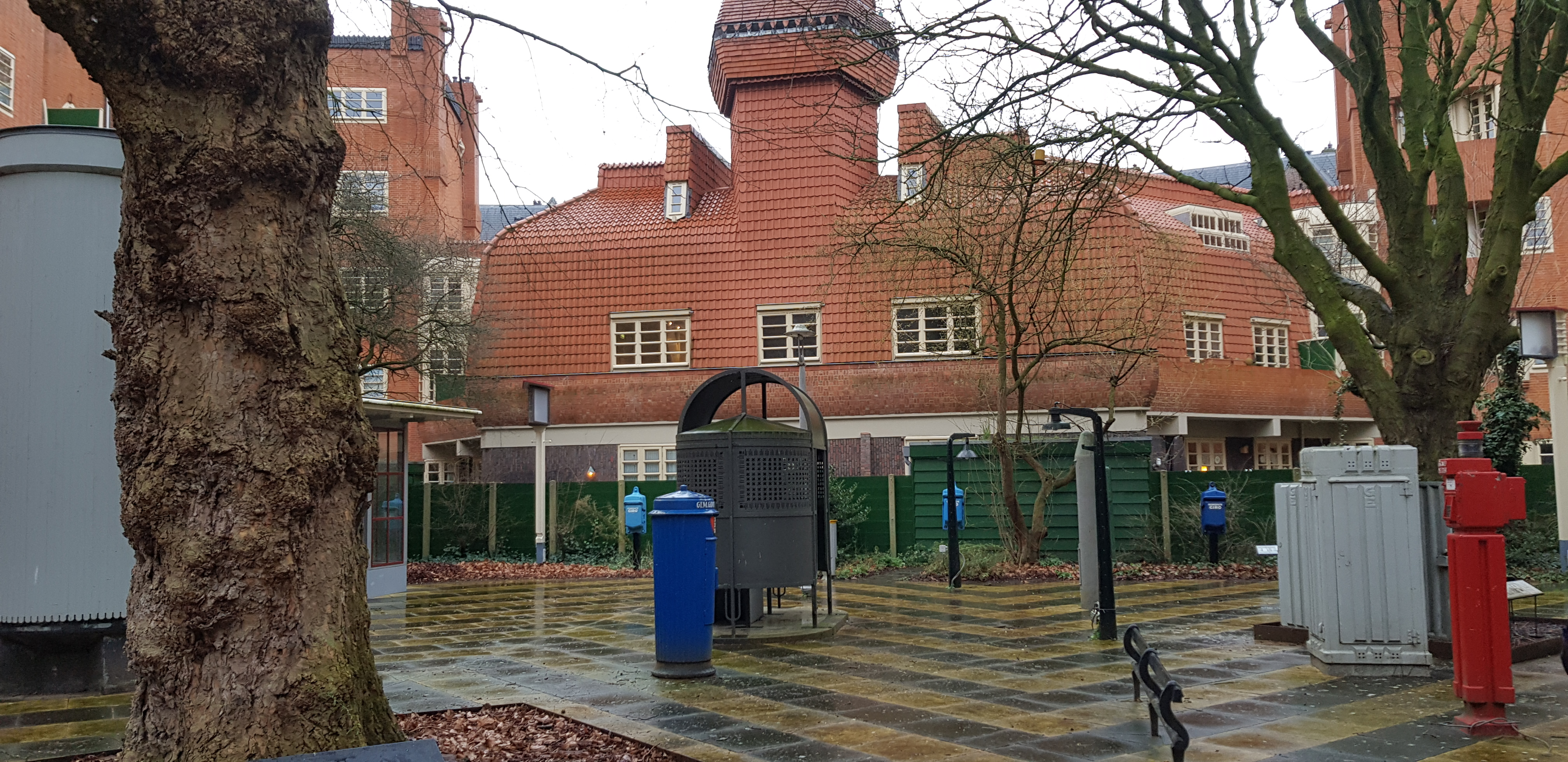
Museum court: featuring a public urinal, or pissoir

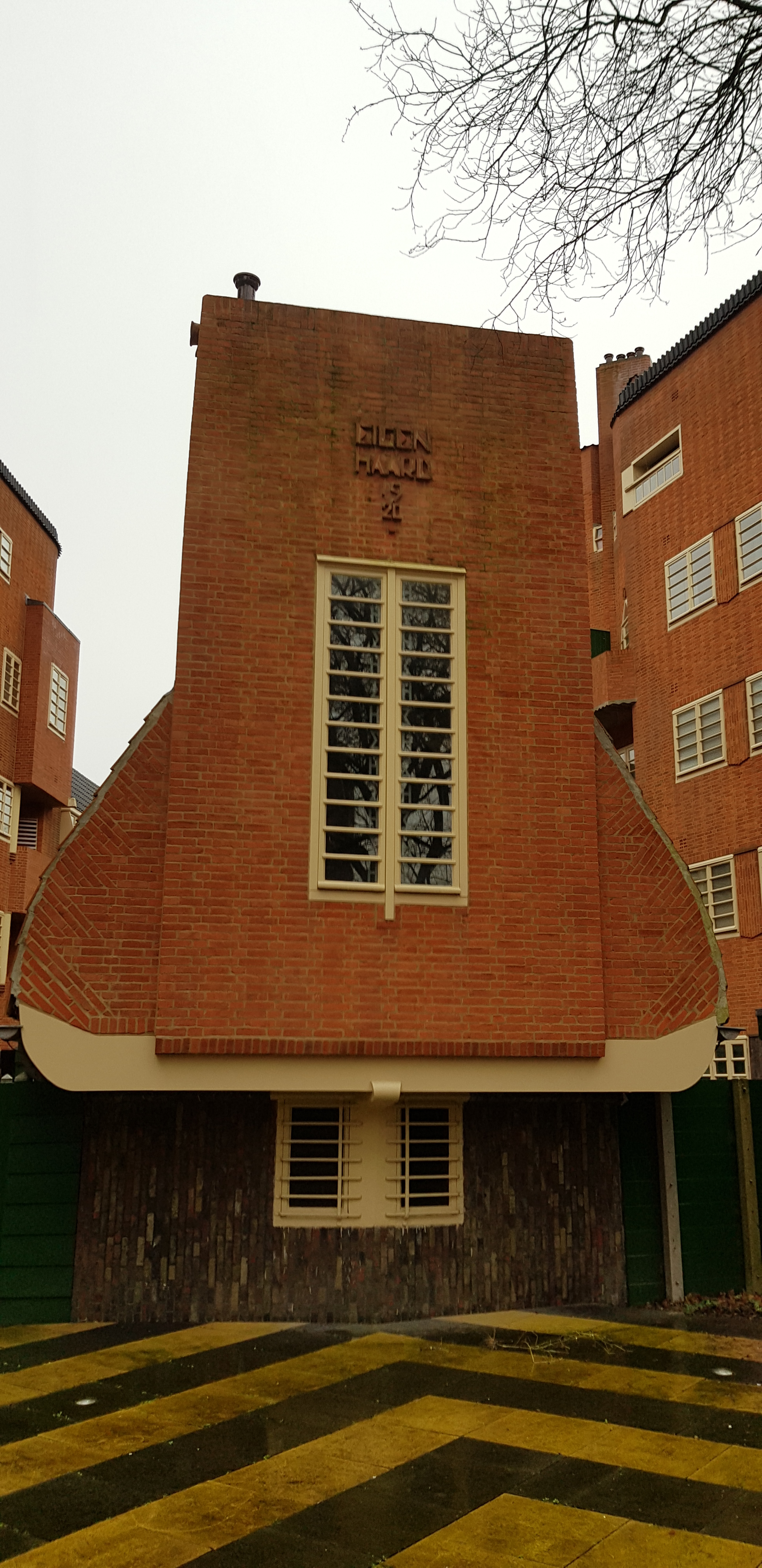
Museum court: a brick ornament of the Amsterdam building society Eigen Haard

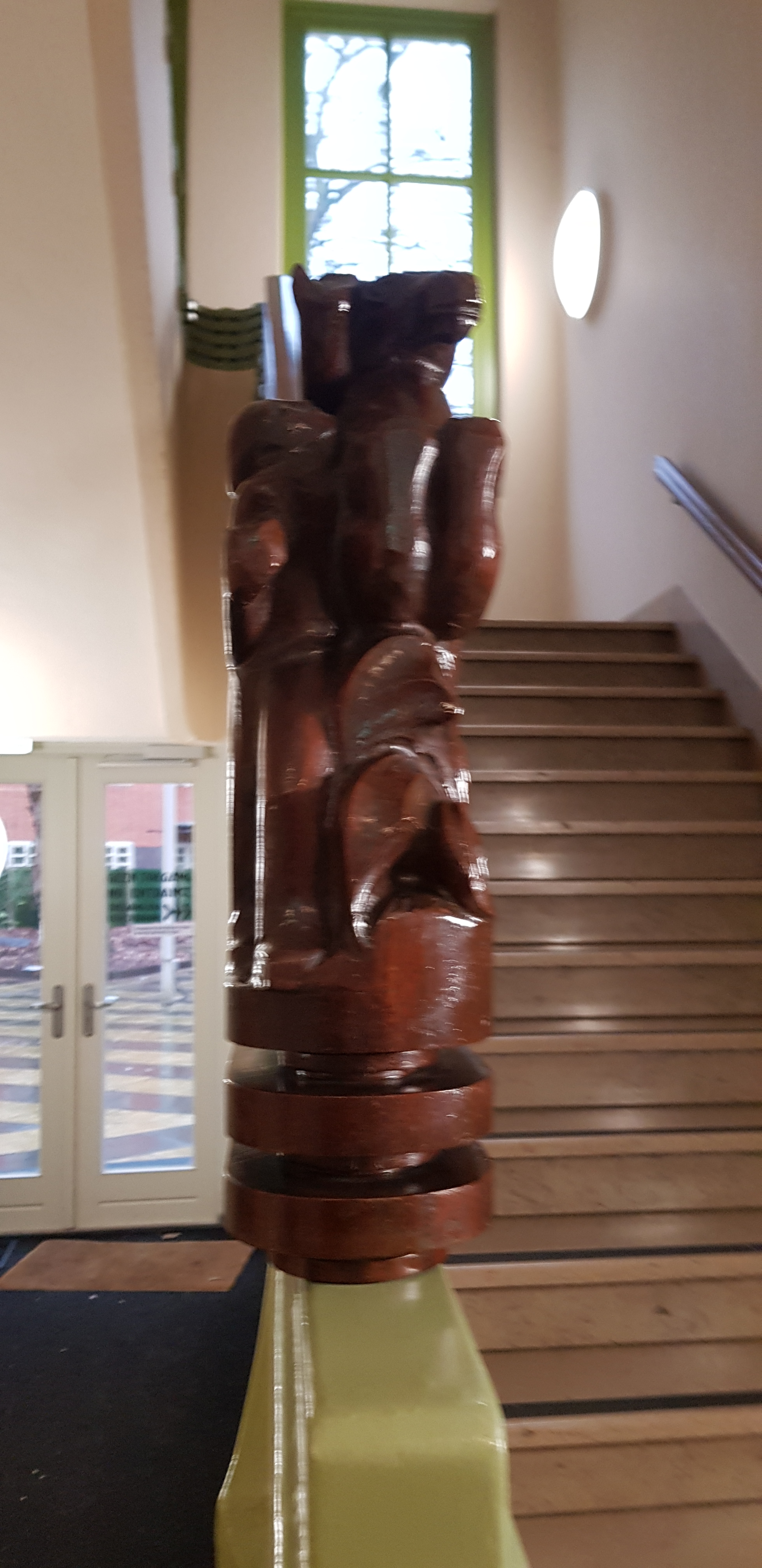
Museum school: staircase with a wooden ornament

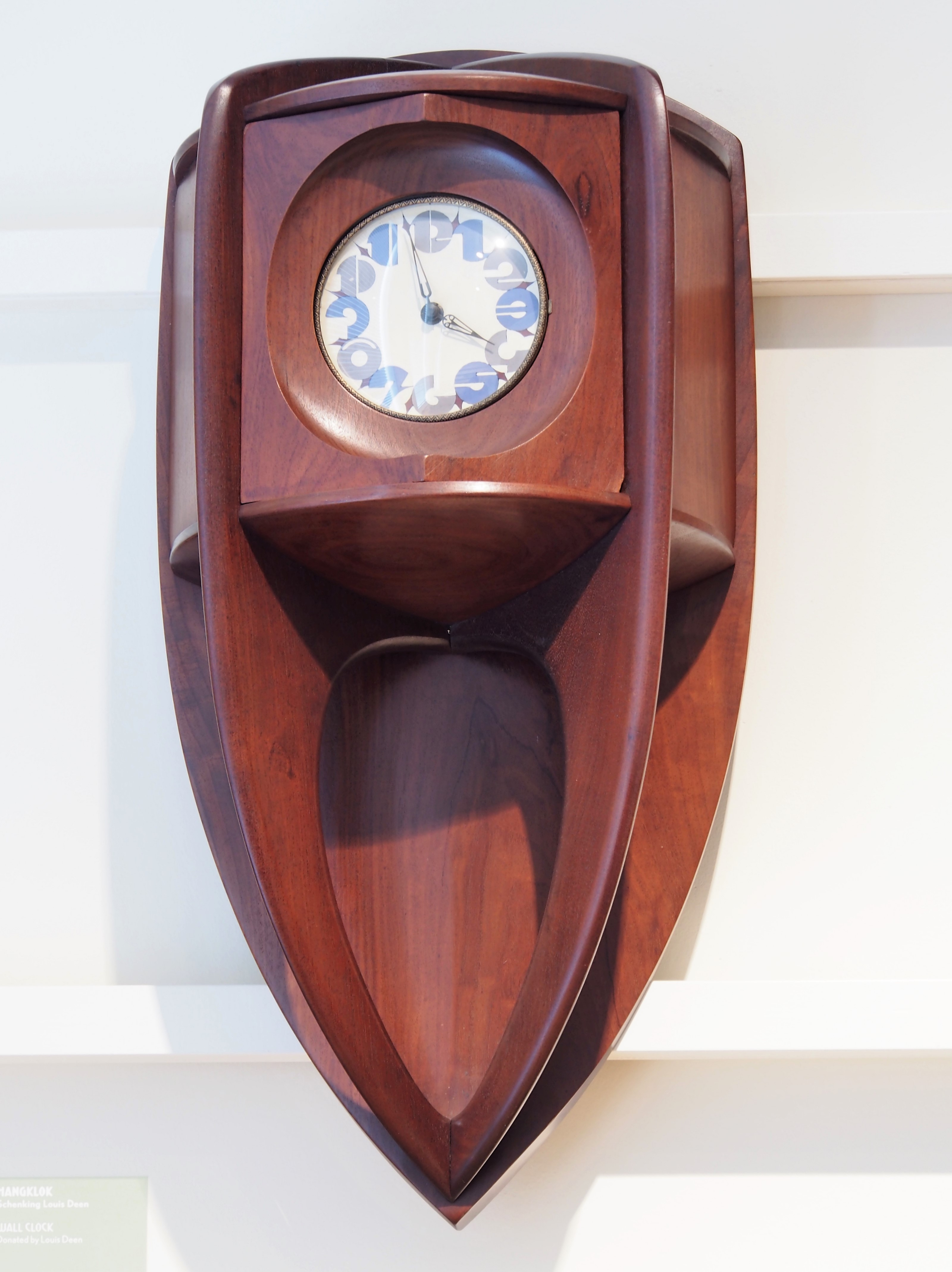
Museum: design clock

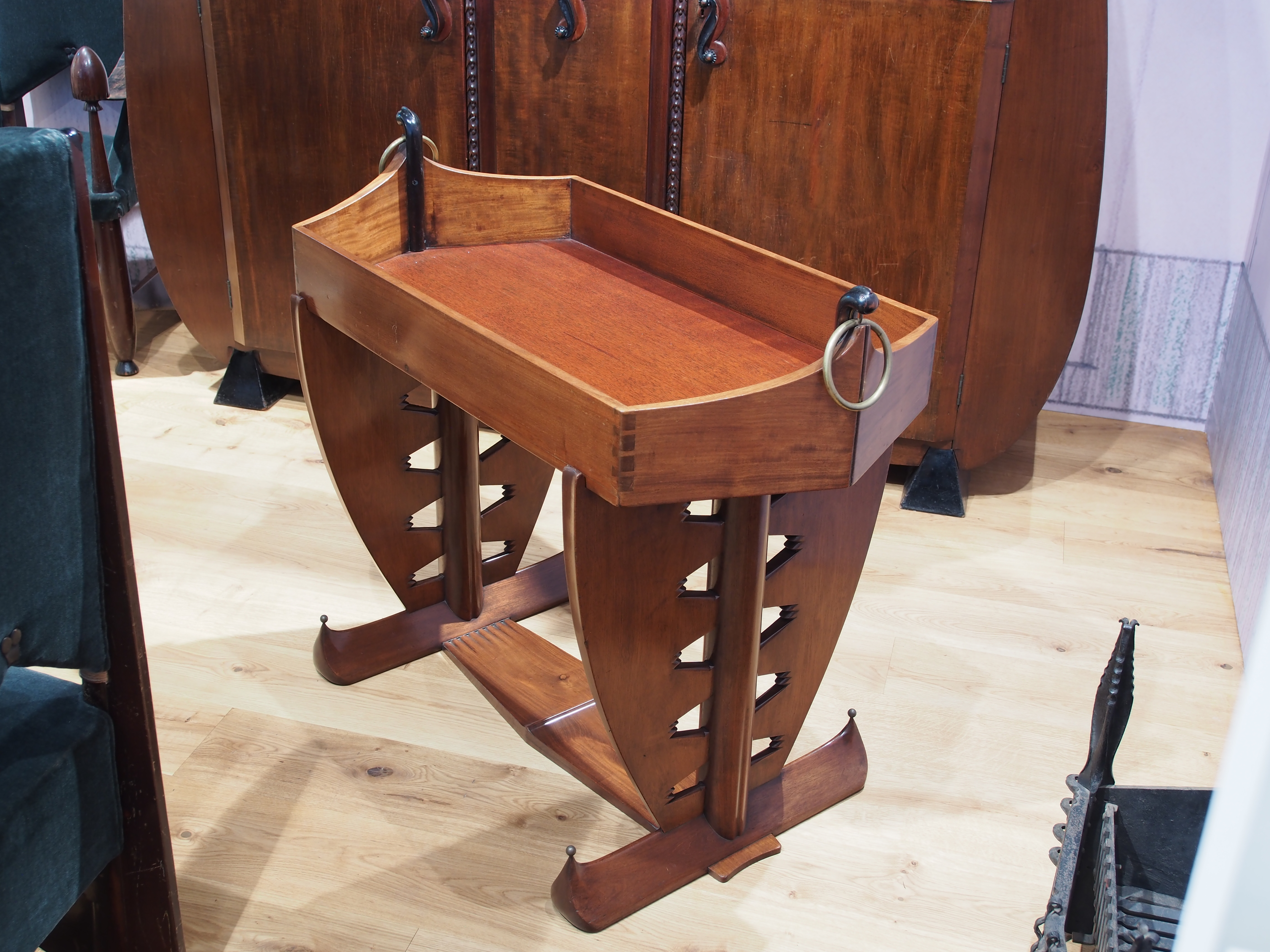
Museum: design table

=== Post office ===
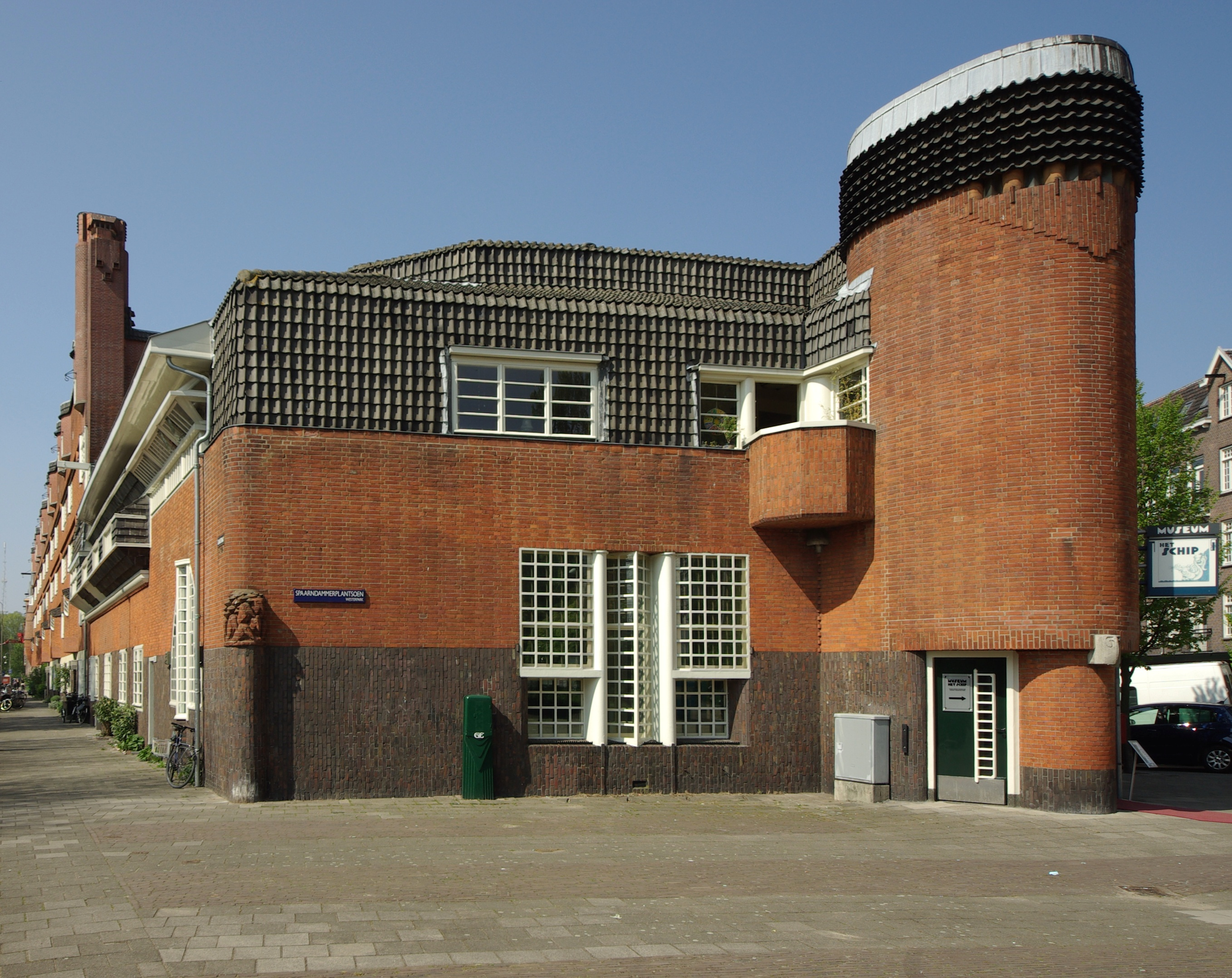
Post office exterior

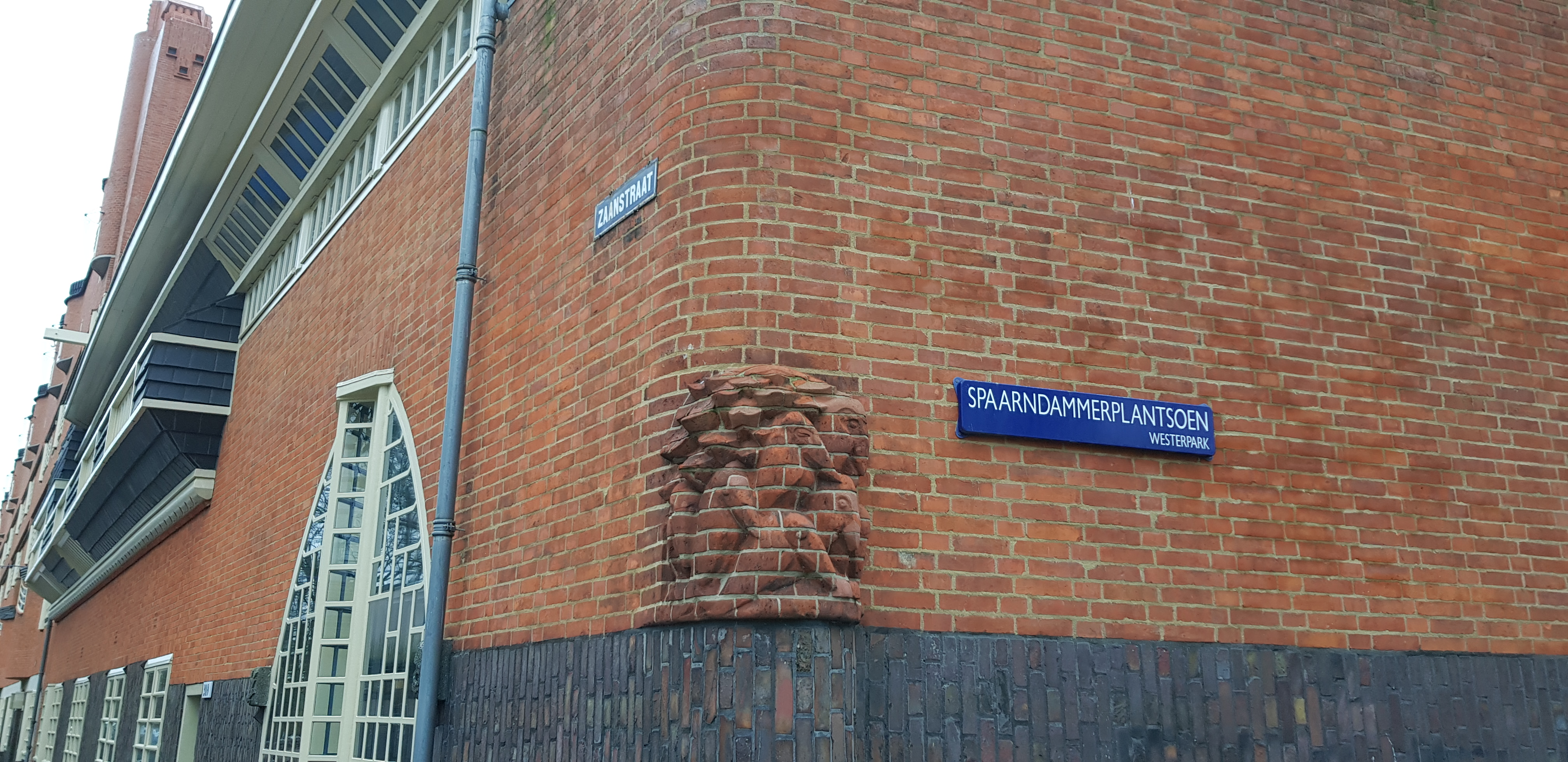
Post office: outside view detail of the corner of the Zaanstraat - Spaarndammerplantsoen with a brick sculpture

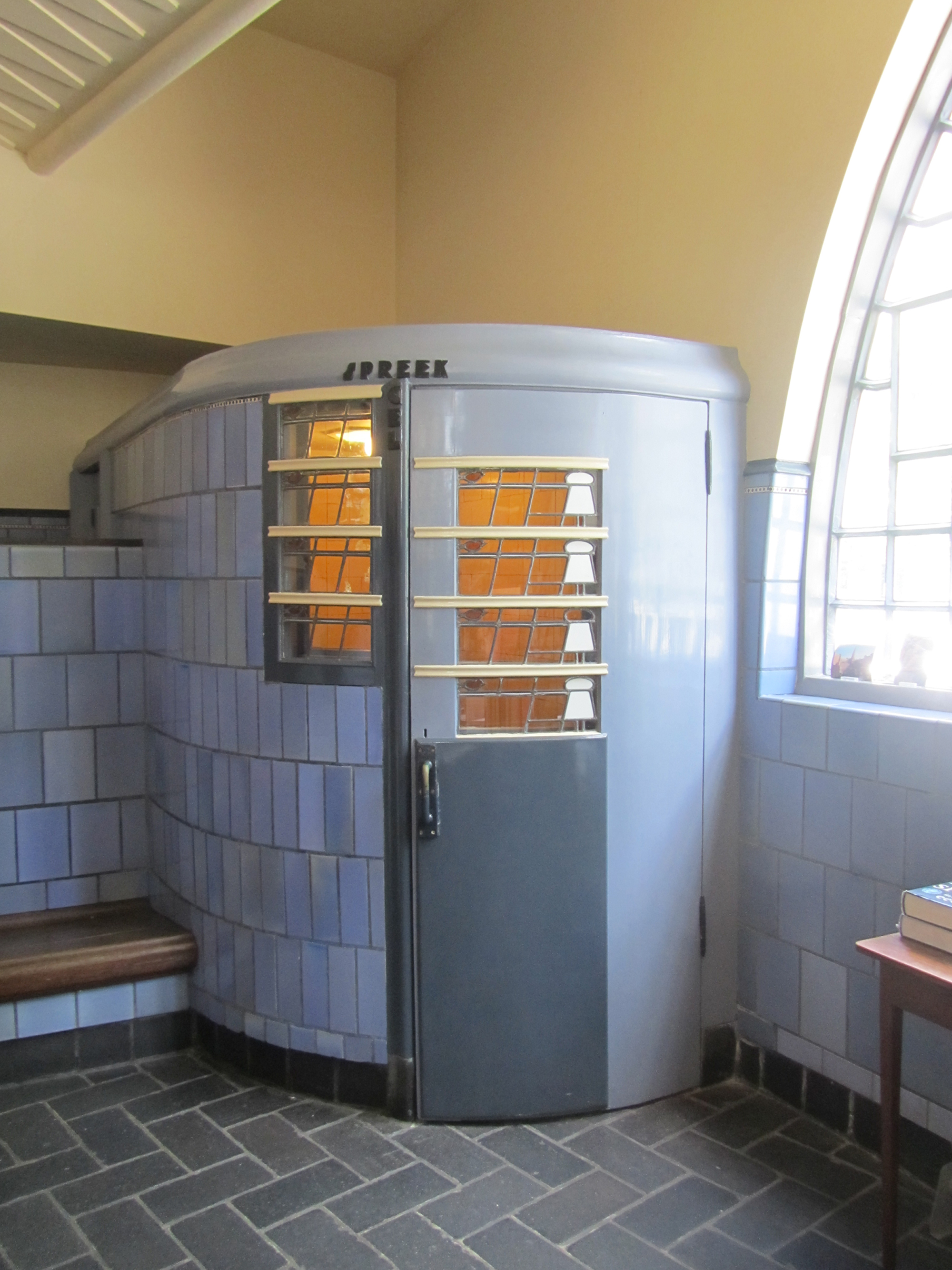
Post office: design telephone cell with the inscription "Spreek" ("Speak")

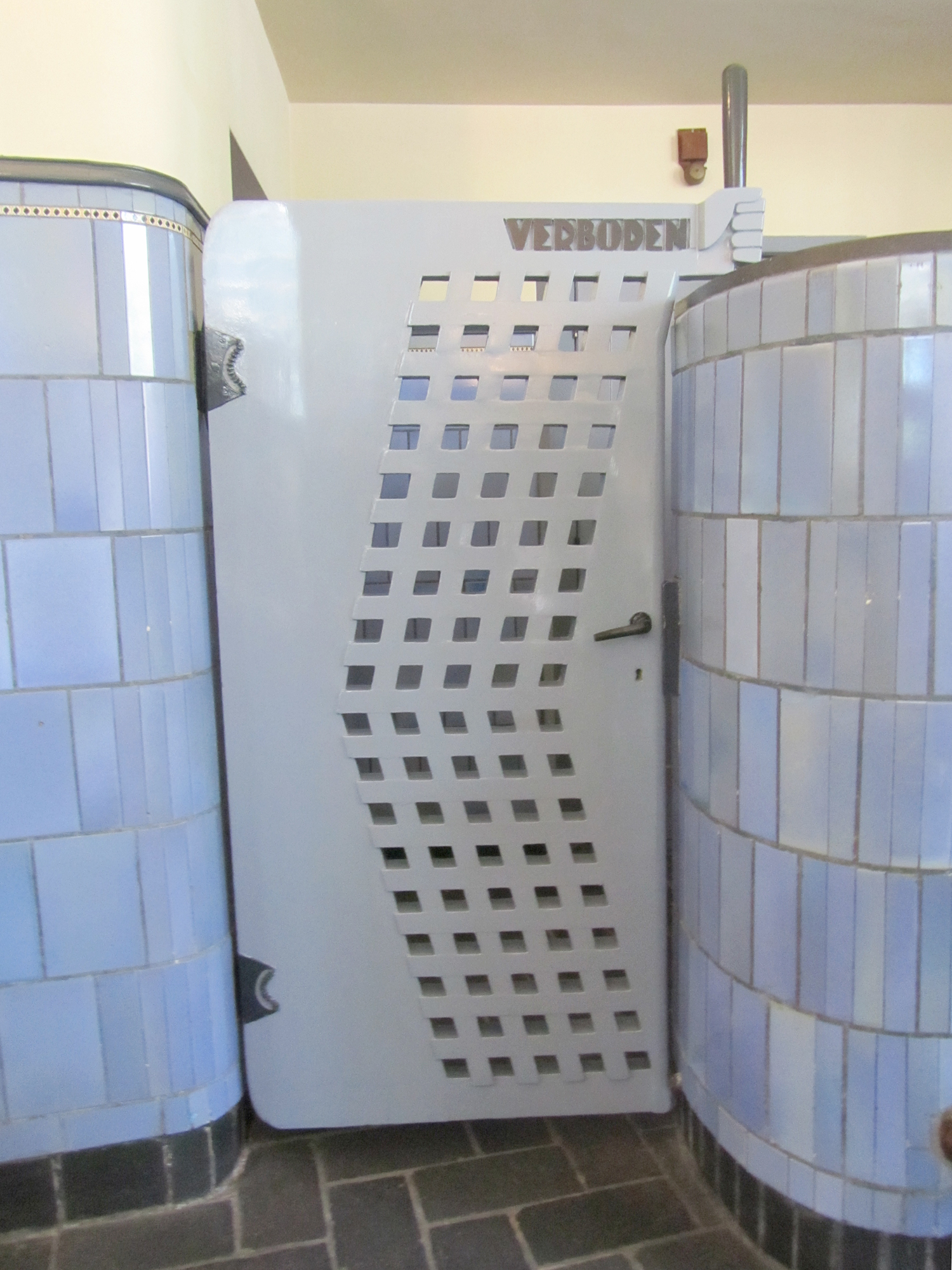
Post office: design door with fist and text "Verboden" ("Restricted area")

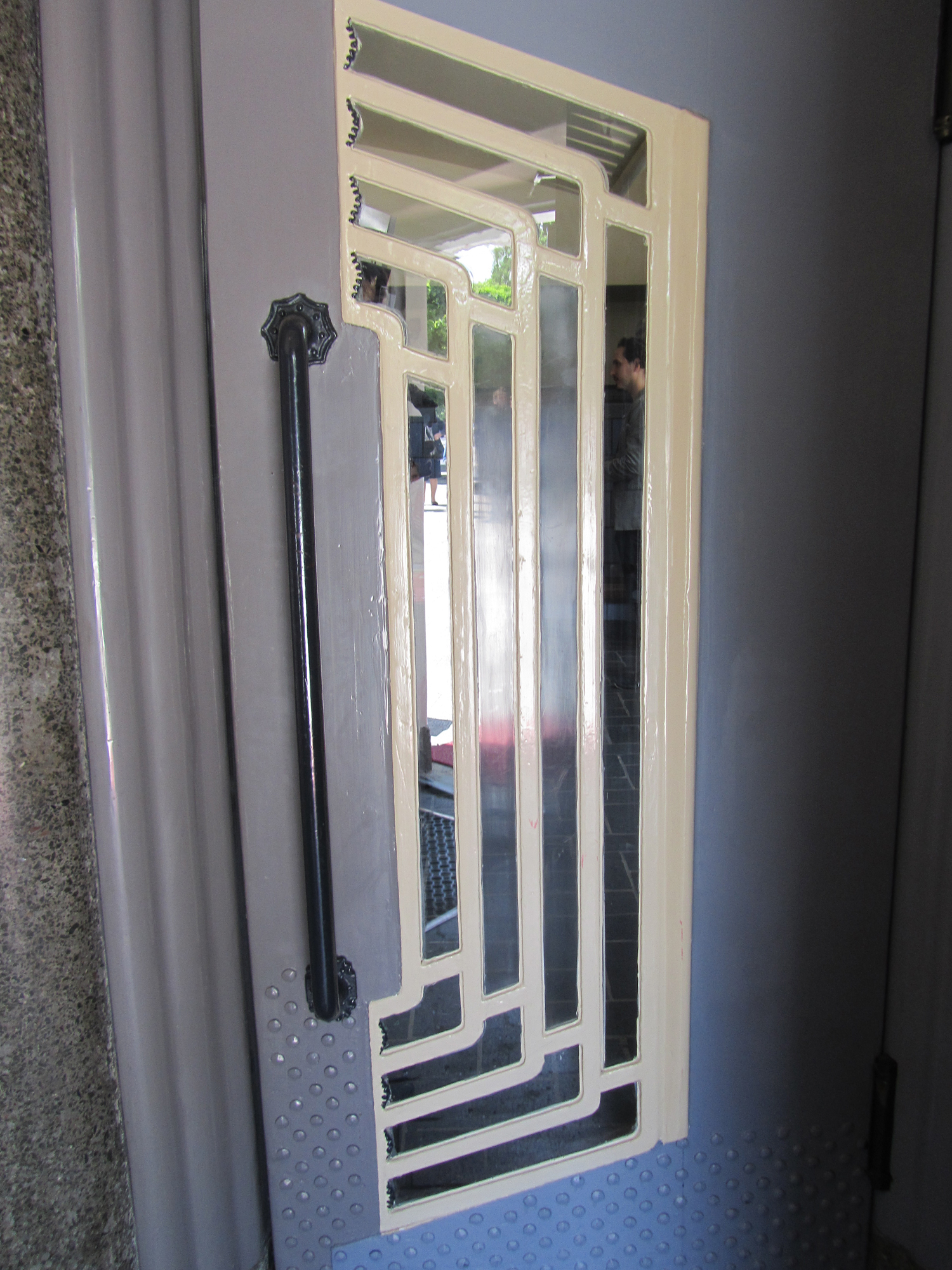
Post office: design post office front door

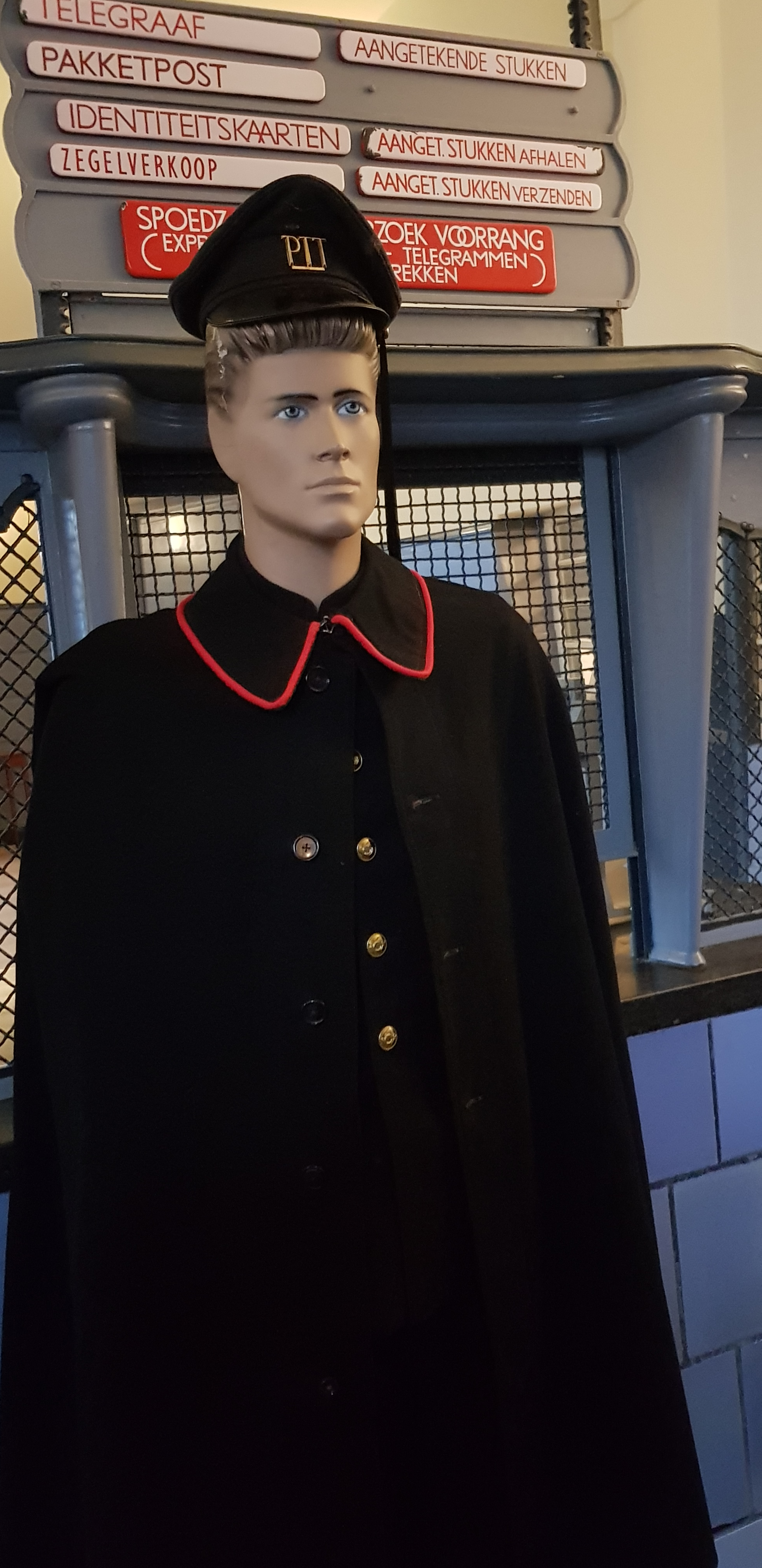
Post office: a mannequin of a post official in uniform with cap

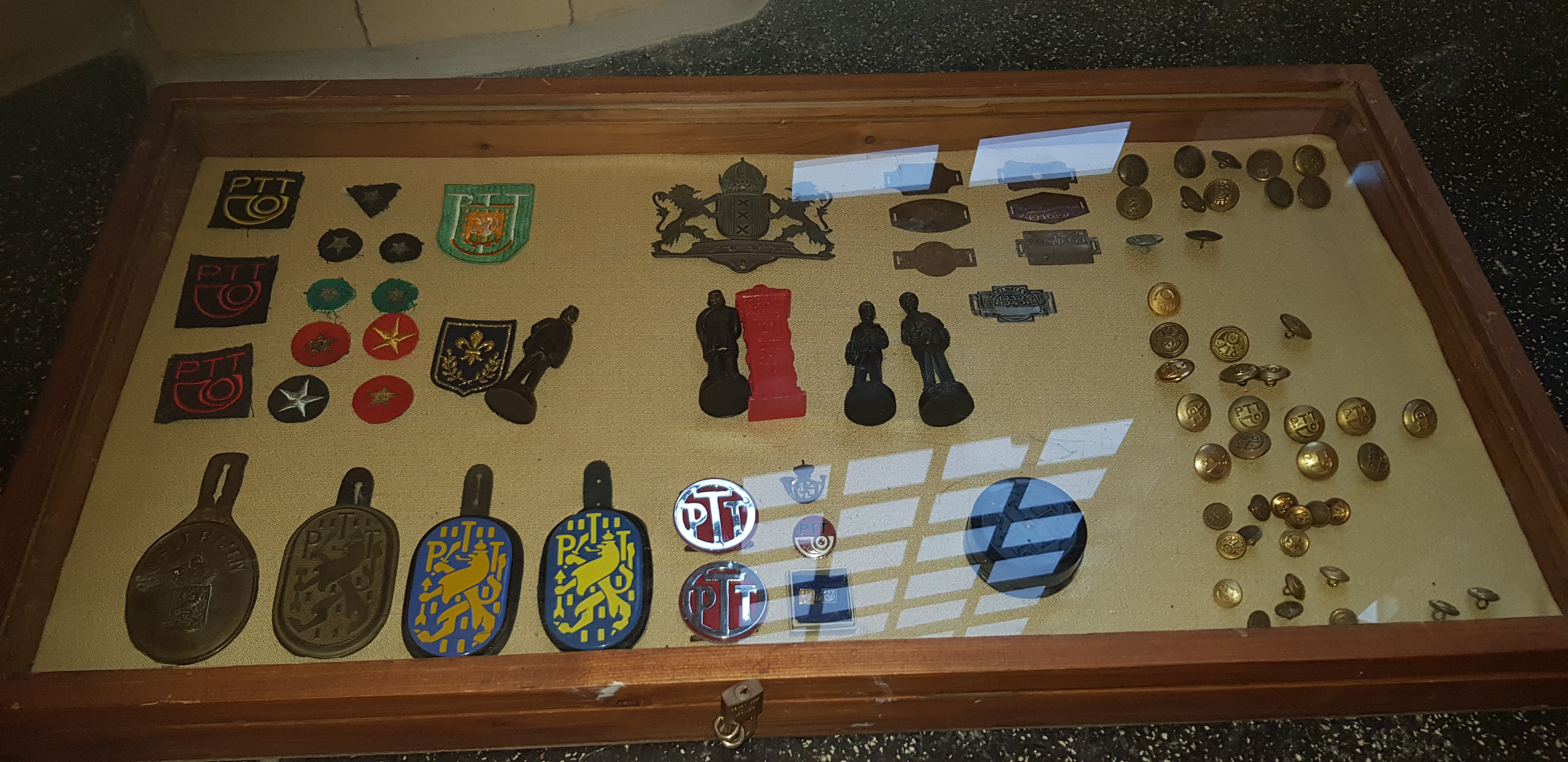
Post office exhibition: textile tags for PTT postal uniforms, metal buttons with PTT inscriptions

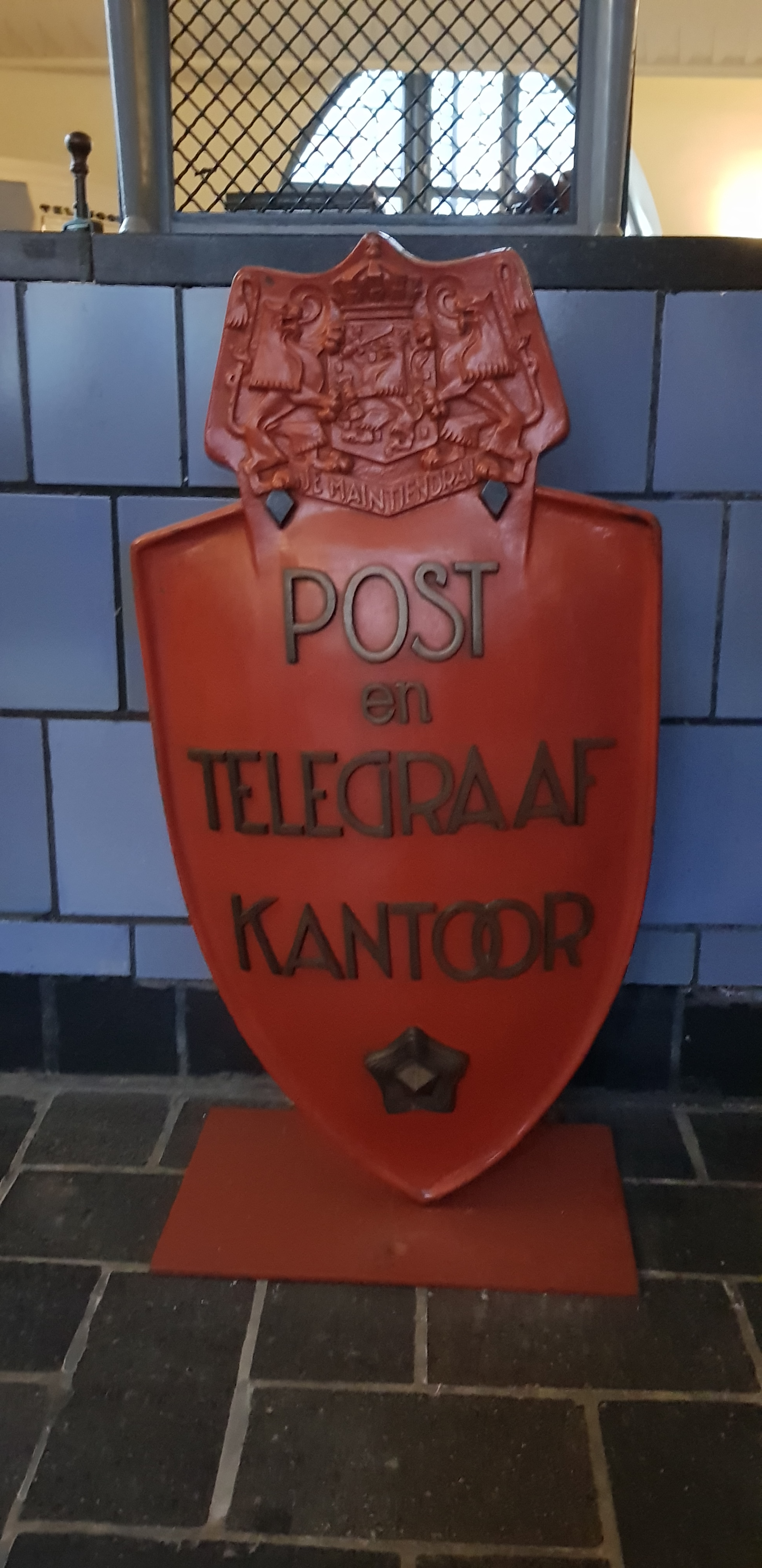
Post office: a shield "Post en Telegraaf Kantoor"

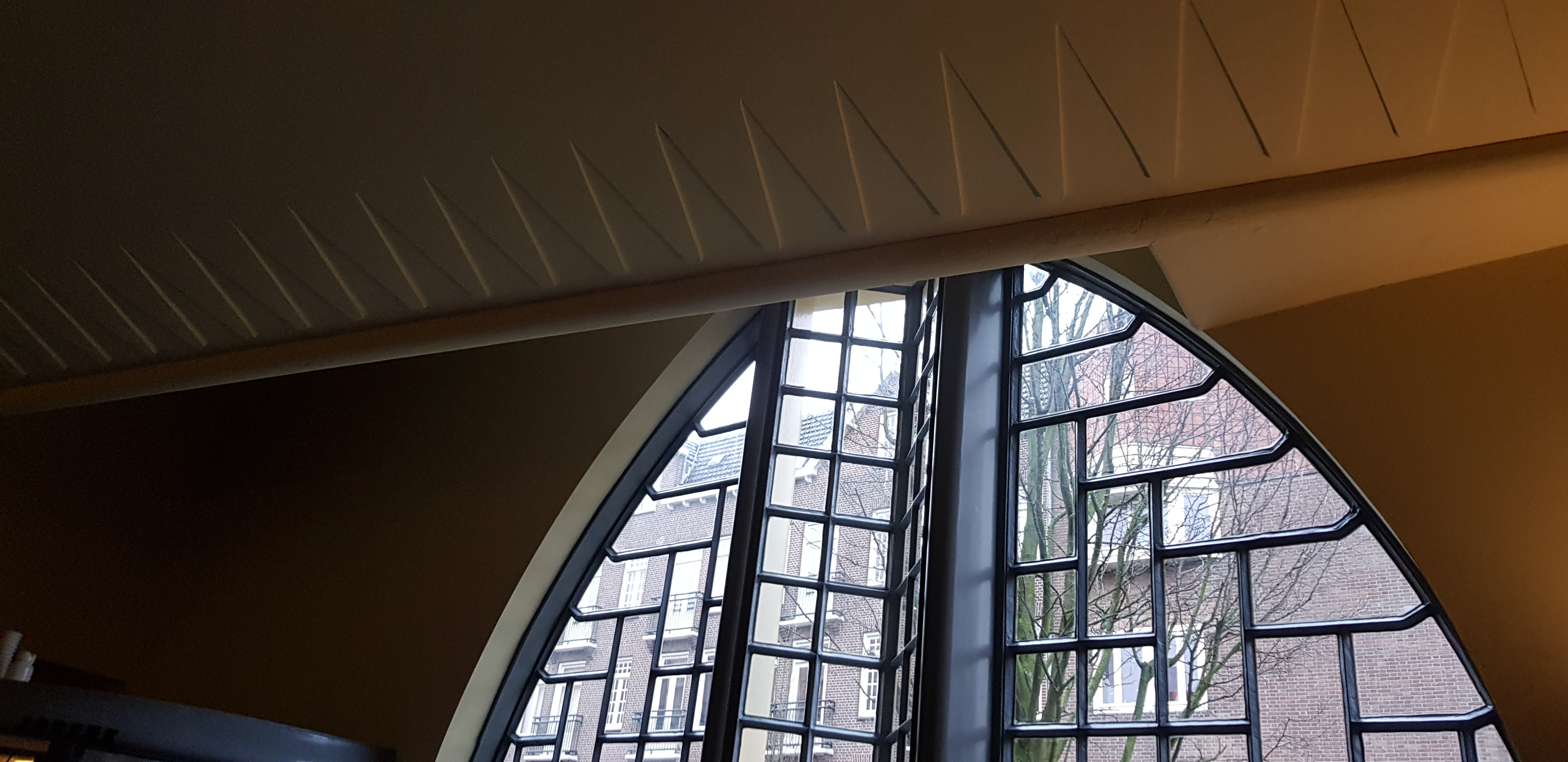
Post office: ceiling with a decoration imitating the edge of a deckled post stamp

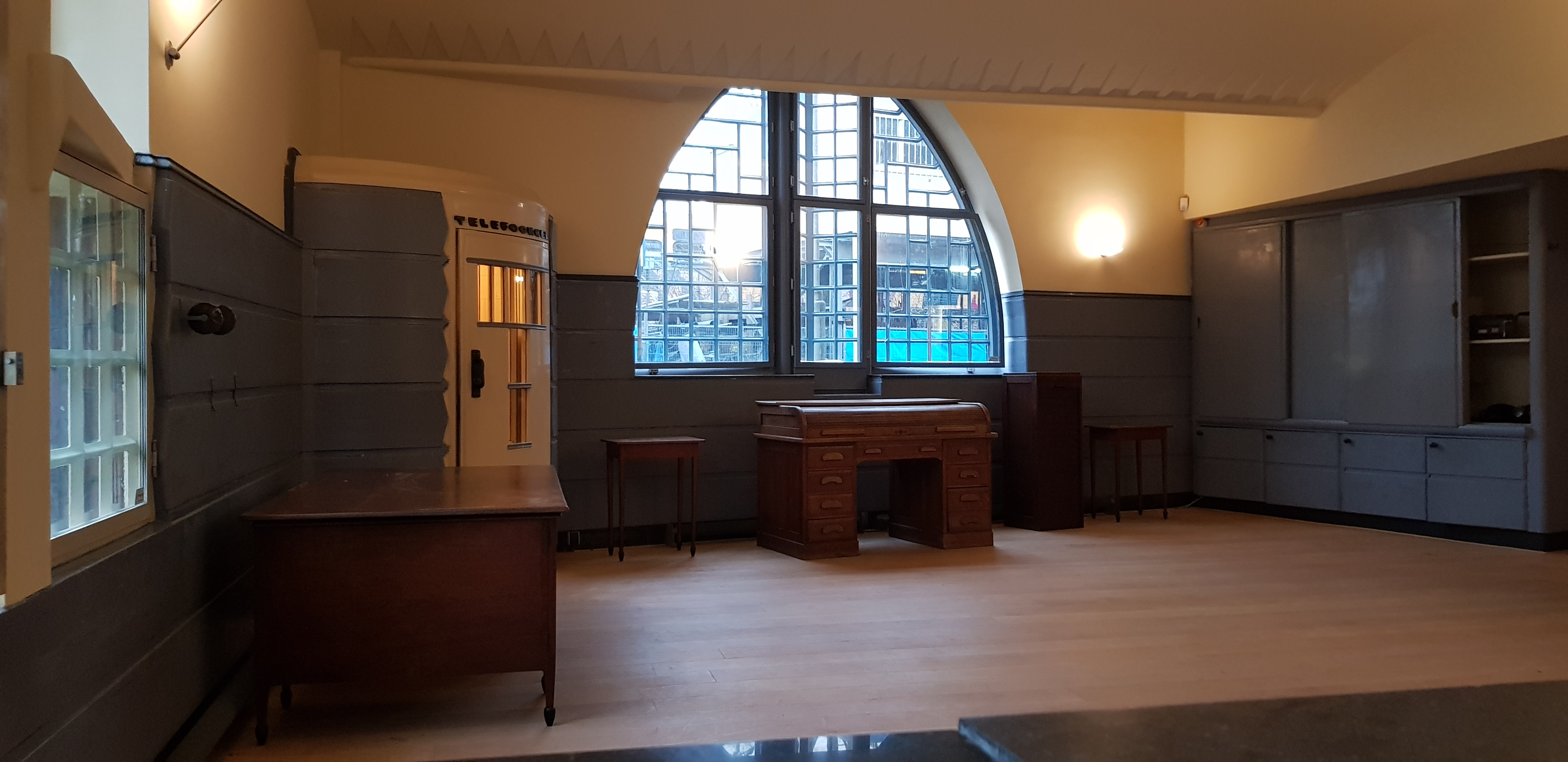
Post office: hall with a design telephone booth and writing desk, seen from the counter

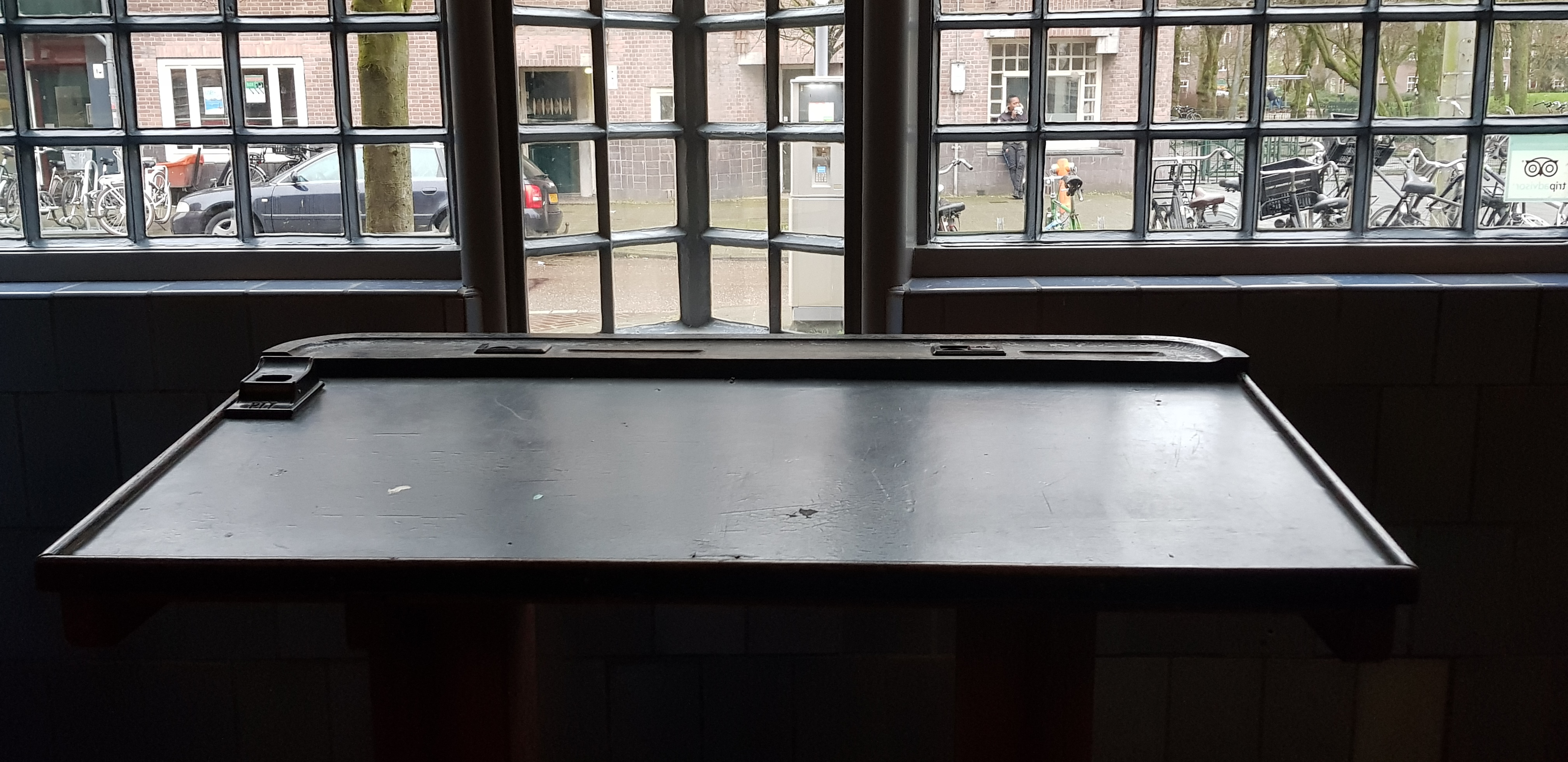
Post office: a writing desk in front of a design protruding window frame

=== Museum housing ===
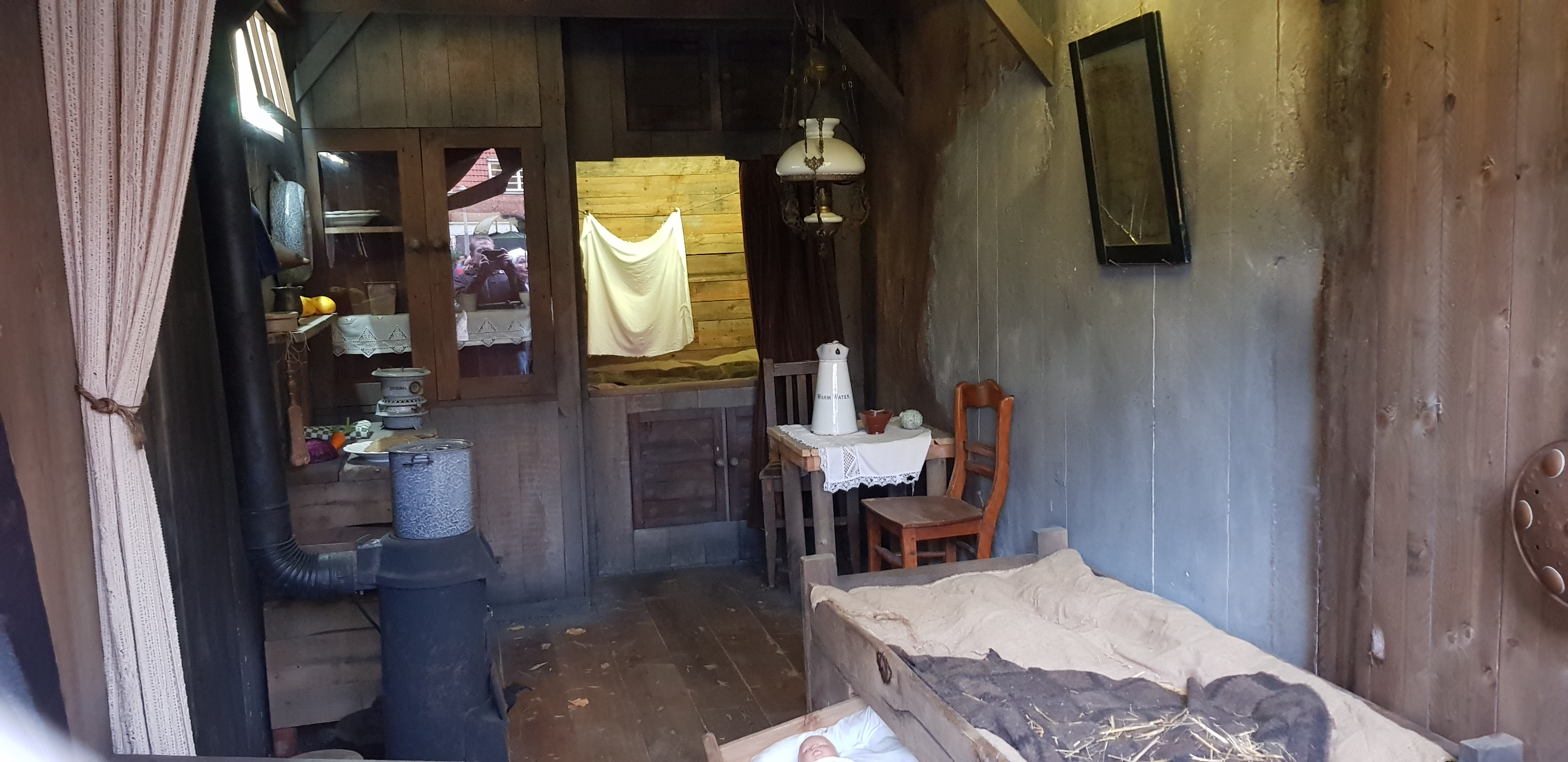
Museum court: a slum lodging

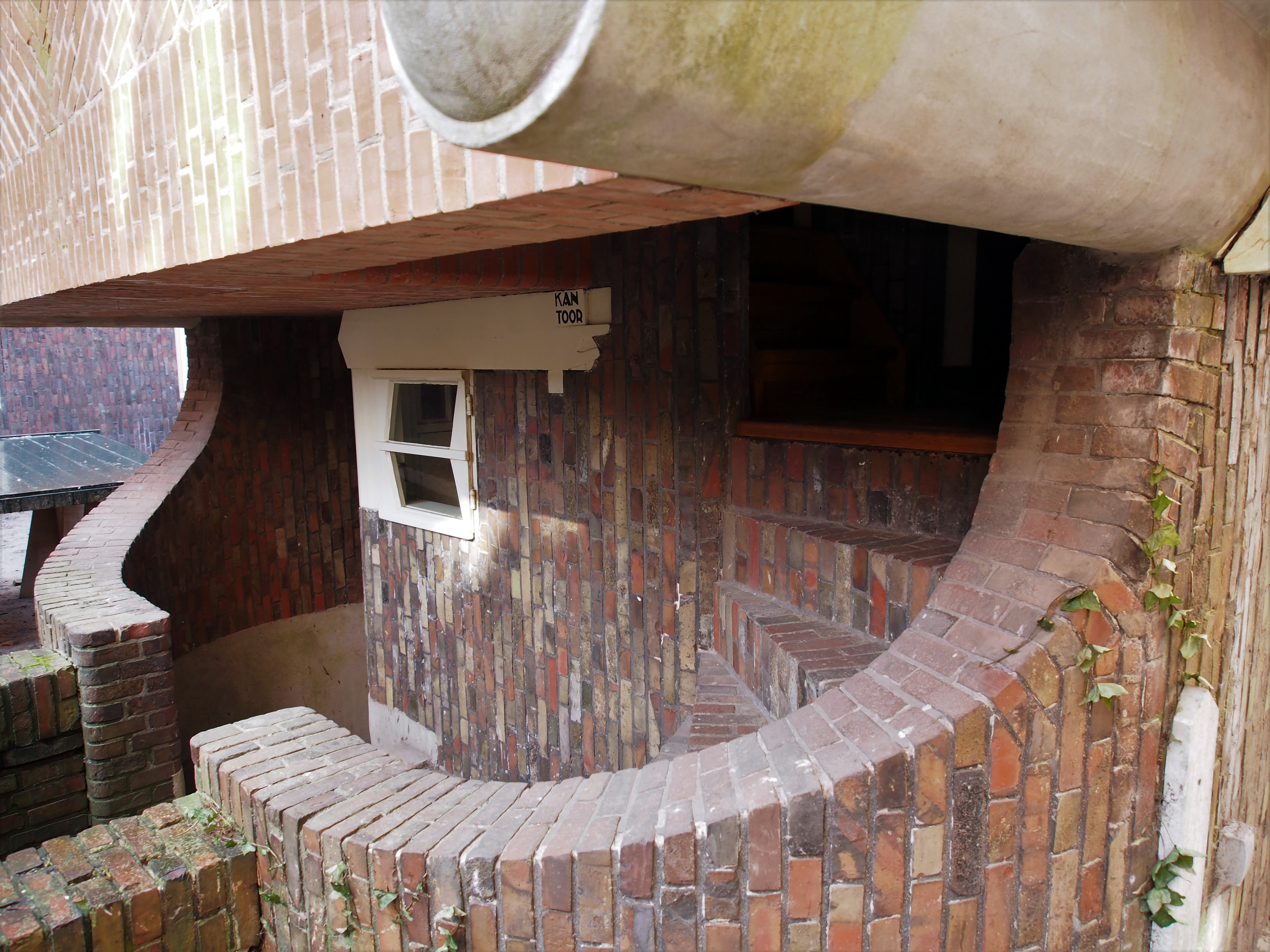
Design office building "vergaderhuisje" [meeting room]

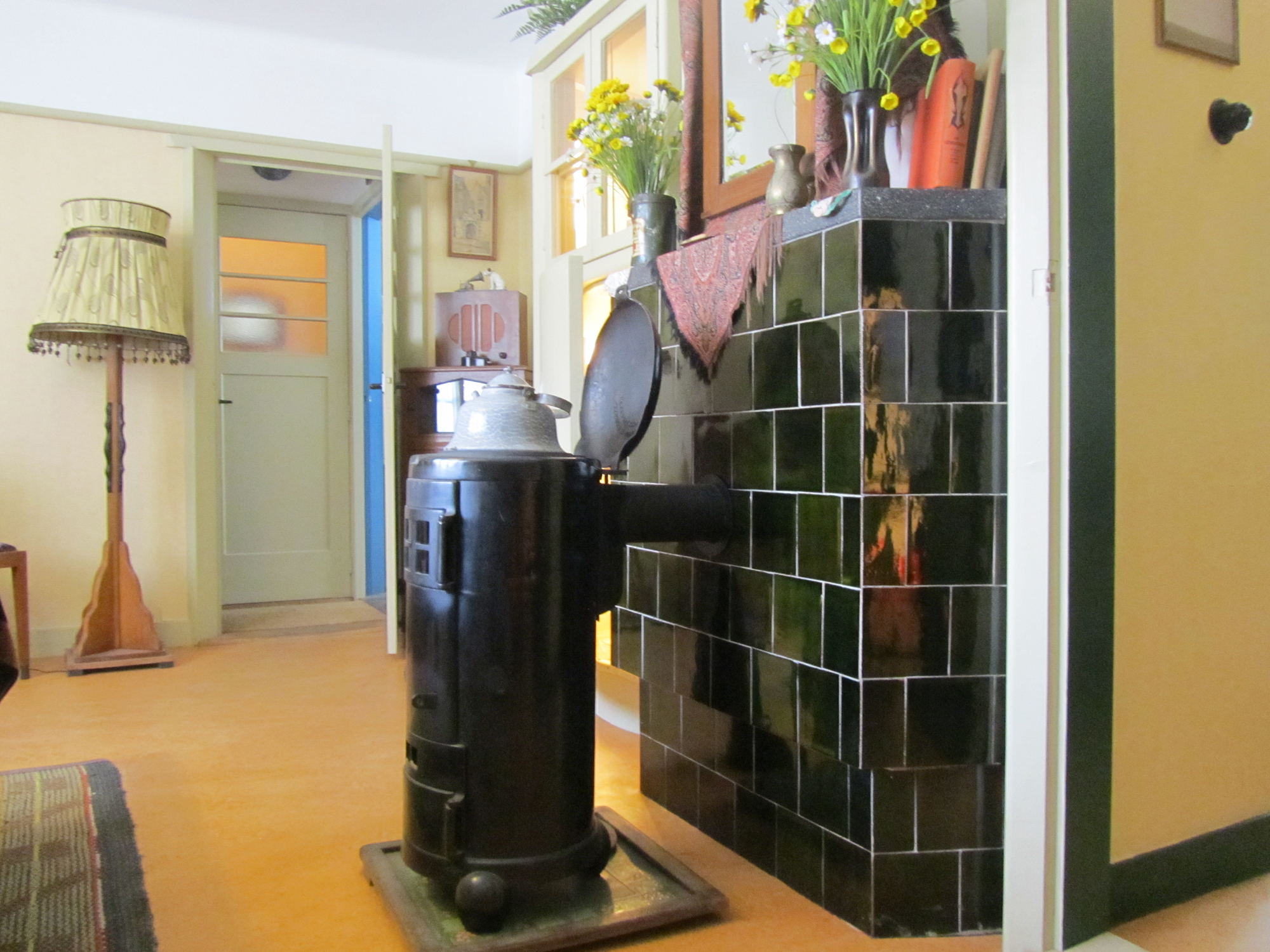
Museum apartment: living room

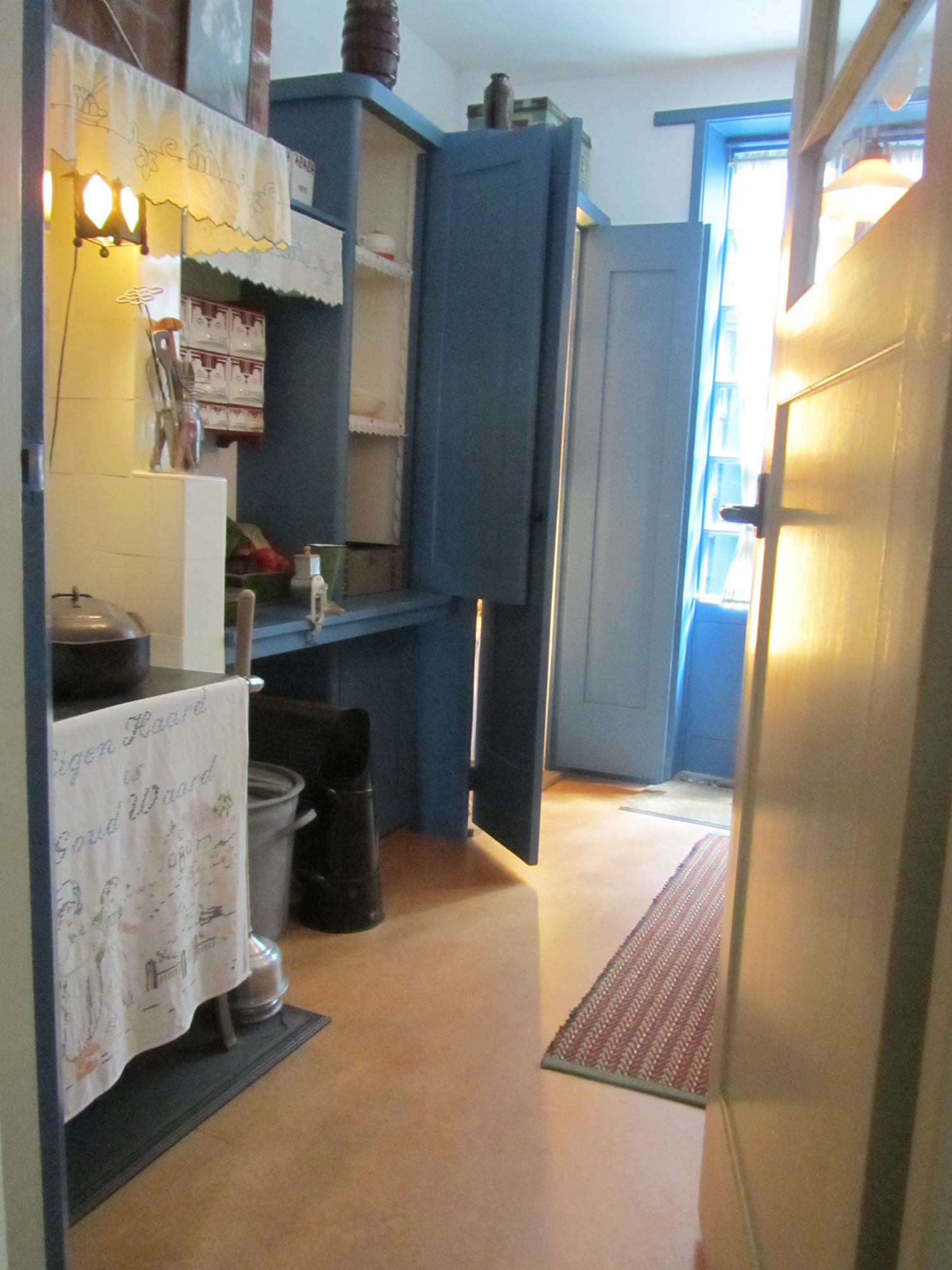
Museum apartment: kitchen

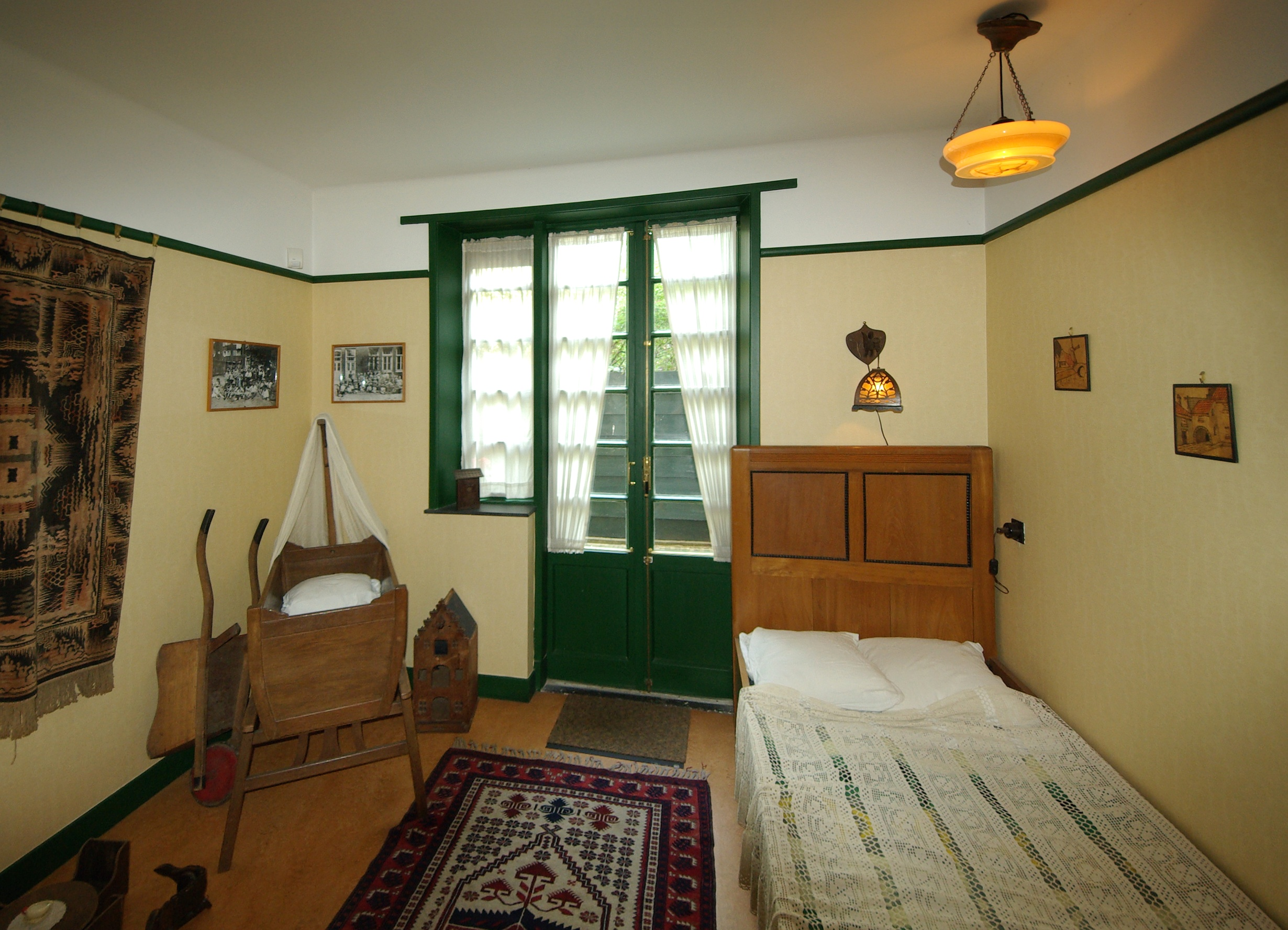
Museum apartment: bedroom
