= Joan van der Mey =

Dutch architect

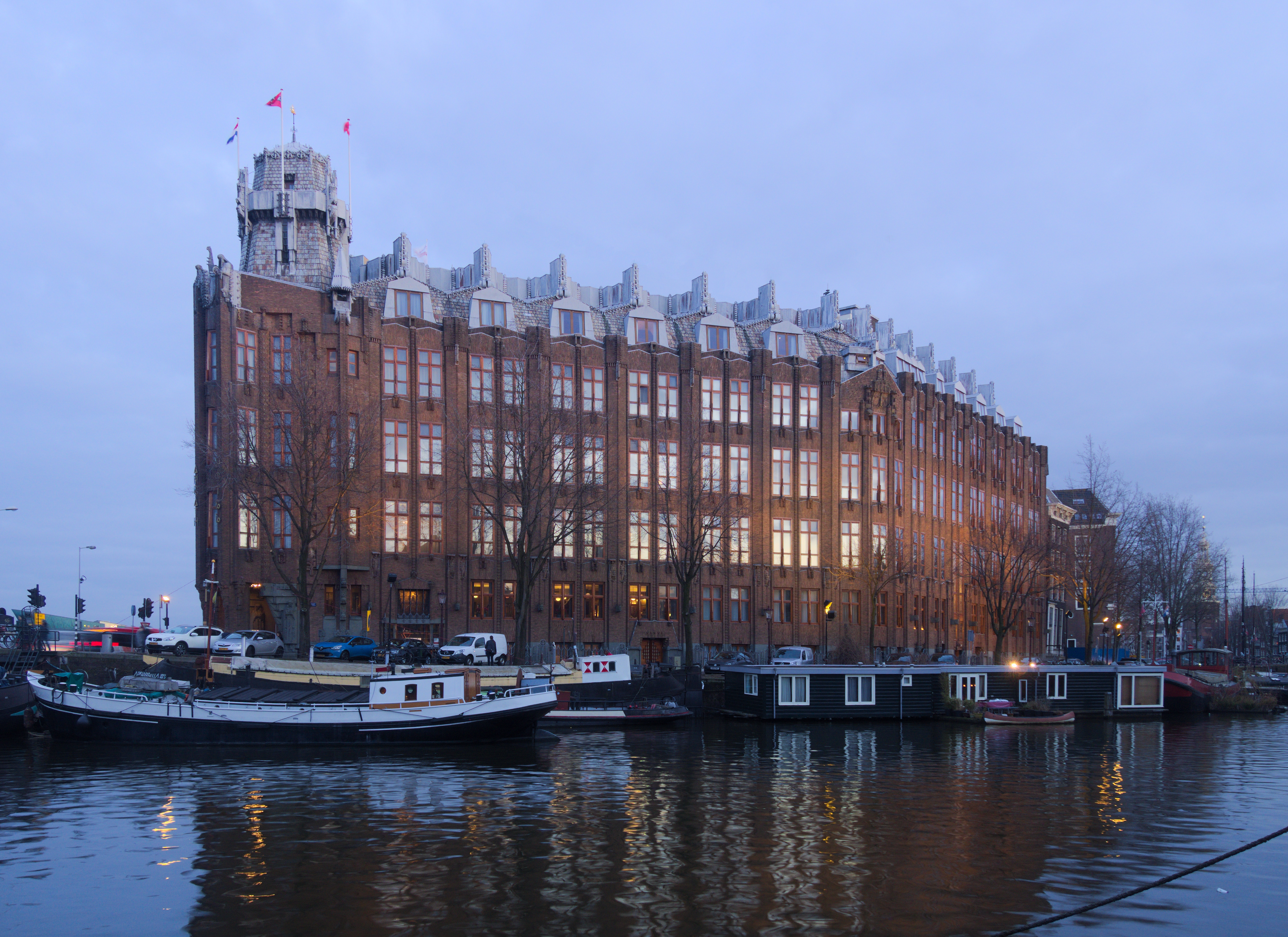
Scheepvaarthuis, Amsterdam

Joan (Jo) Melchior van der Mey (19 August 1878, Delfshaven – 6 June 1949, Geulle) was a Dutch architect best known as the originator of the Amsterdam School style of architecture. His most famous work is the landmark Scheepvaarthuis (Shipping House) building in Amsterdam located at Prins Hendrikkade, 1912.

Van der Mey was a student of Eduard Cuypers from 1898, won the Dutch Prix de Rome in 1906; he was taken on by the city of Amsterdam as an "Aesthetic Advisor". In 1905 Amsterdam was the first city in the world to impose a building code, and later they hired van der Mey as their civic building artist. In this capacity he developed the facade for the 1912 Palm House at the Hortus Botanicus among other buildings.

That same year brought the commission for the Scheepvaarthuis, a large cooperative building for six Dutch shipping companies. Van der Mey sought the assistance of his former colleague-architects Michel de Klerk and Piet Kramer, and the architect Adolf Daniël Nicolaas van Gendt was responsible for engineering the concrete structure.

Van der Mey's job was to coordinate the extensive symbolic art and sculptural program, inside and outside. Much of the sculpture is the work of Hildo Krop and H. A. van den Eijnde, but a large group of well-known artists contributed.

The Scheepvaarthuis is regarded as a highlight of the Amsterdam School of building. Michel de Klerk went on to become its most important representative. Van der Mey also designed bridges and housing complexes in south Amsterdam and around the city's Mercatorplein.
