= Amsterdam School =

Dutch architectural style

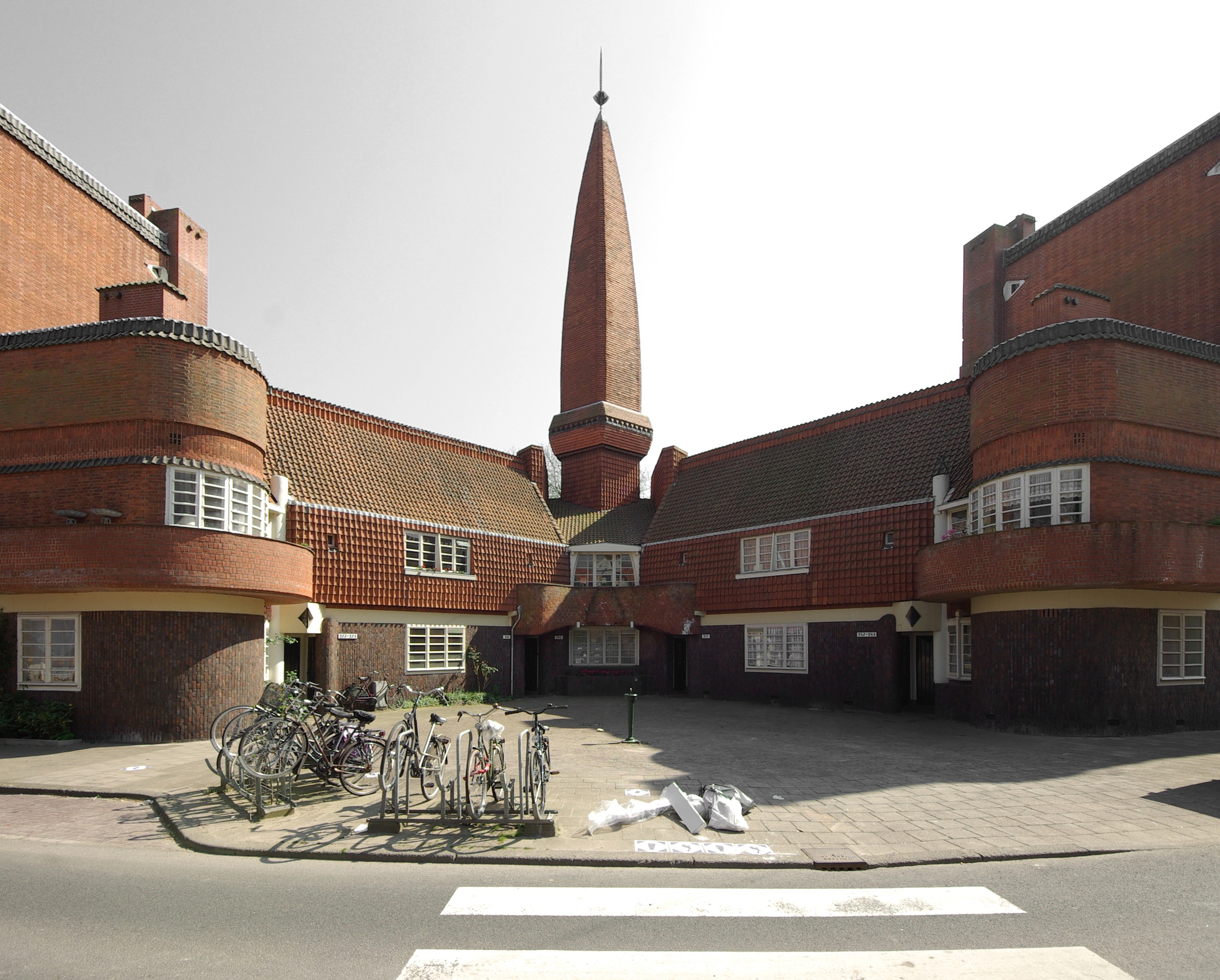
'Het Schip' apartment building in Amsterdam, 1917–1920 (Michel de Klerk)

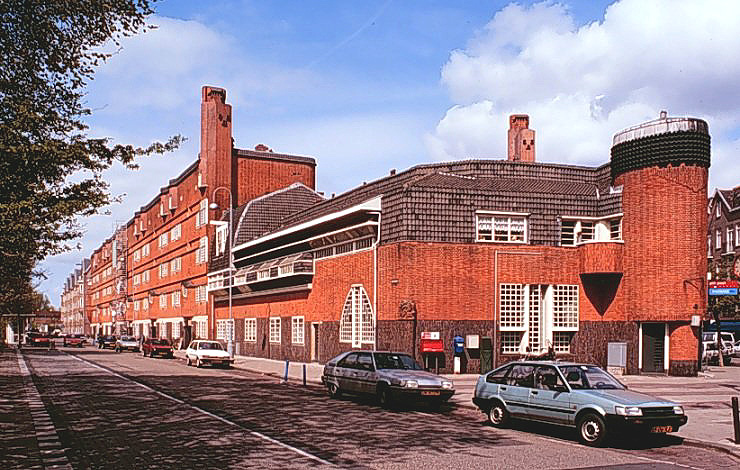
'Het Schip' apartment building, Zaanstraat

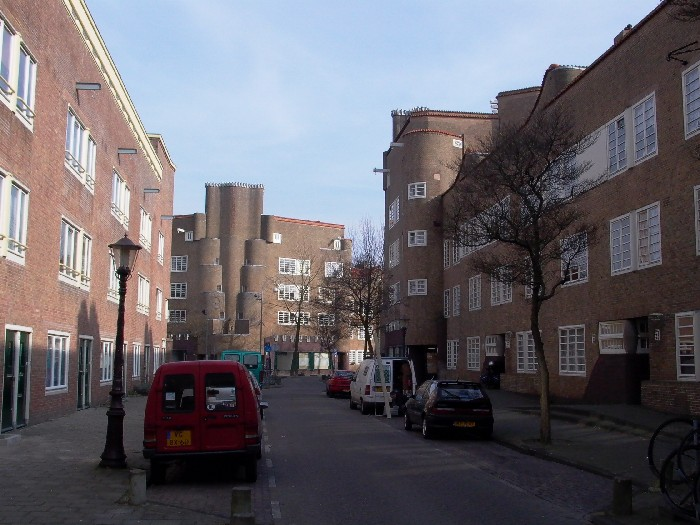
'De Dageraad' housing estate, P.L.Takstraat in Amsterdam, 1920–1923 (Piet Kramer)

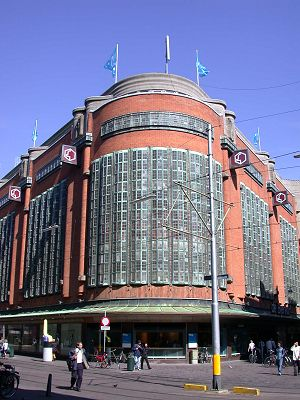
'De Bijenkorf' department store in The Hague, 1924–1926 (Piet Kramer)

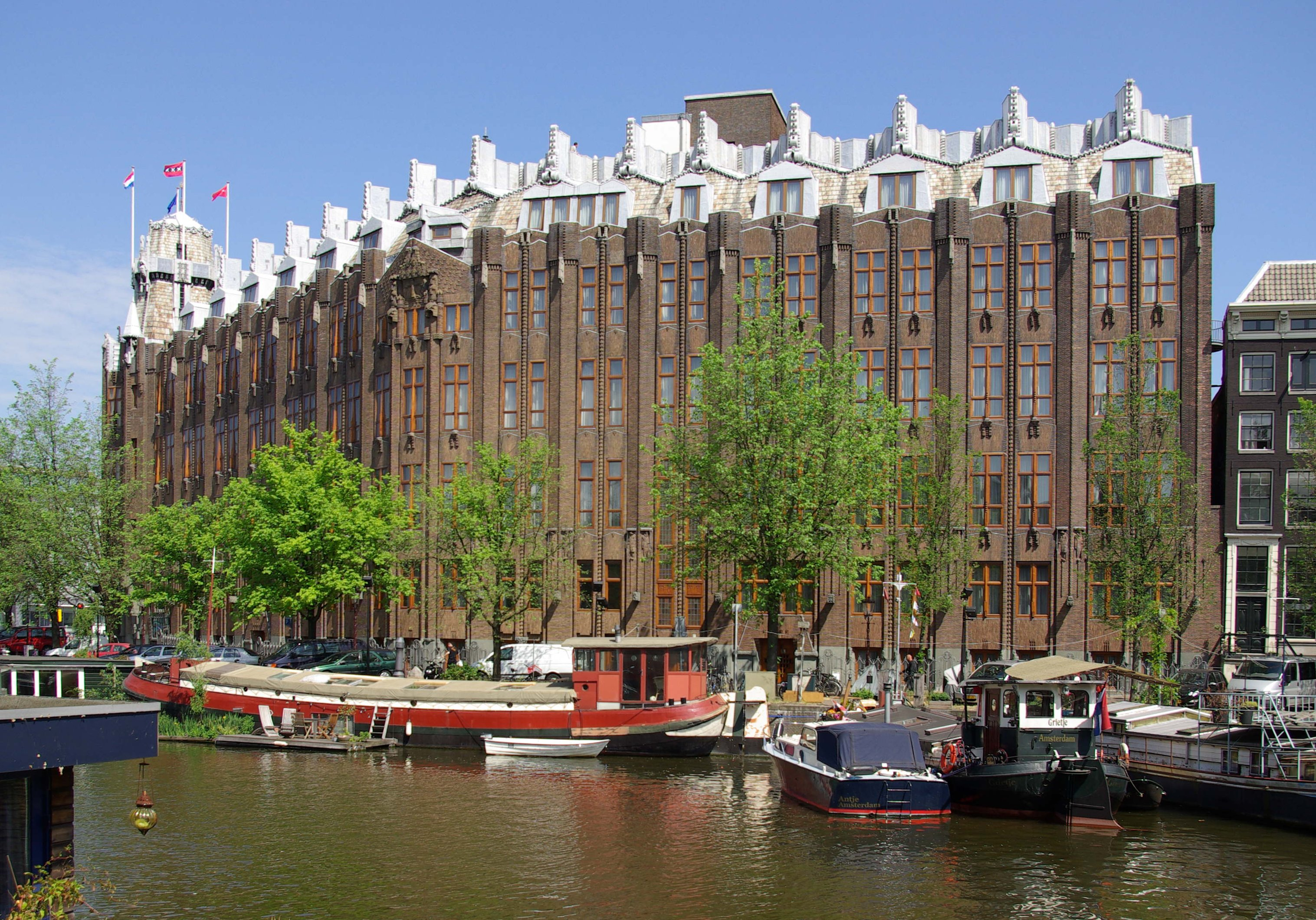
The Scheepvaarthuis, Amsterdam. Architects: Johan van der Mey, Michel de Klerk, Piet Kramer

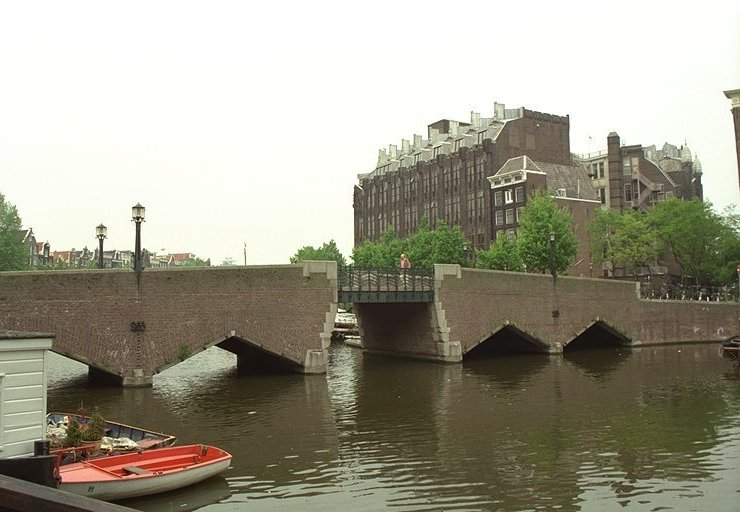
Bridge by Johan van der Mey

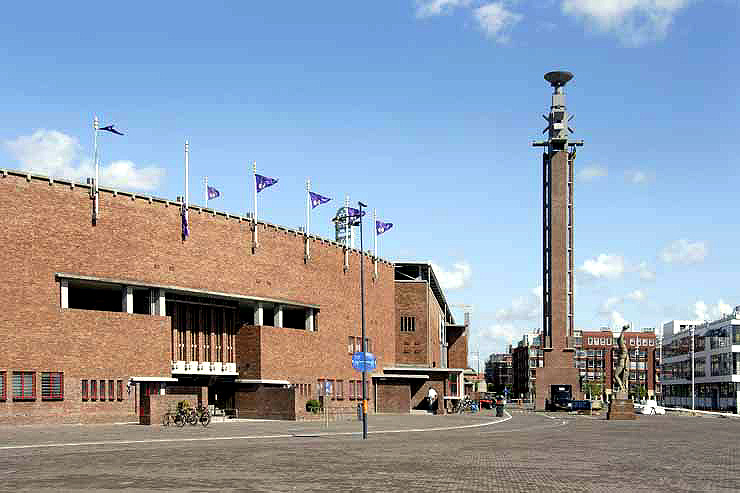
Olympic Stadium, Amsterdam (1928), designed by Jan Wils

The Amsterdam School (Dutch: Amsterdamse School) is a style of architecture that arose from 1910 through about 1930 in the Netherlands. The Amsterdam School movement is part of international Expressionist architecture, sometimes linked to German Brick Expressionism.

Buildings of the Amsterdam School are characterized by brick construction with complicated masonry with a rounded or organic appearance, relatively traditional massing, and the integration of an elaborate scheme of building elements inside and out: decorative masonry, art glass, wrought ironwork, spires or "ladder" windows (with horizontal bars), and integrated architectural sculpture. The aim was to create a total architectural experience, interior and exterior.

== Different modern movements in the 1920s ==
Imbued with socialist ideals under figures such as Floor Wibaut, the Amsterdam School style was often applied to working-class housing estates, local institutions and schools. For many Dutch towns Hendrik Berlage designed the new urban schemes, while the architects of the Amsterdam School were responsible for the buildings. With regard to the architectural style, Michel de Klerk had a different vision than Berlage. In the magazine Bouwkundig Weekblad (45/1916), Michel de Klerk criticized Berlage's recent buildings in the style of Dutch Traditionalism. In this context, the Stock Exchange by Berlage of 1905 can be seen as the starting point of Traditionalist architecture. From 1920 to 1930 different parallel movements developed in the Netherlands:

- Traditionalism (Kropholler, partly Berlage)
- Expressionism (de Klerk, Kramer)
- New Hague School
- De Stijl (Rietveld, Oud, van Doesburg with manifesto De Stijl/1917 against the "Modern Baroque" of the Amsterdam School)
- Rationalism (van Eesteren, van Tijen, Merkelbach with manifesto De-8/1927 against the Amsterdam School)
- Constructivism (Duiker, van der Vlugt)
- The specific Brick-Cubism by Dudok and Berlage.

The Expressionist architecture of the Amsterdam School was the most successful style of the 1920s. For many foreign architects, Amsterdam was the "Mecca" for new town extensions. But the Traditionalist movement lasted longer, until the 1950s, thanks to the so-called Delft School, represented by Martinus Granpré Molière at the Delft University of Technology. In the 1960s the Rationalist movement was dominant. In a well-known speech, the Dutch Rationalist, Willem van Tijen declared the Amsterdam School a warning example for architects (published in Forum 9/1960-61). After the death of Piet Kramer in 1961, no architectural institution or museum was interested in his Expressionist work. For that reason, all his drawings, blueprints and models were burnt.

== Origins of the Amsterdam School ==
The Amsterdam School had its origins in the office of architect Eduard Cuypers in Amsterdam. Although Cuypers was not a progressive architect himself, he gave his employees plenty of opportunity to develop. The three leaders of the Amsterdam School Michel de Klerk, Joan van der Mey and Piet Kramer all worked for Cuypers until about 1910. In 1905 Amsterdam was the first city to establish a building code, and the city hired Johan van der Mey afterwards, in the special position as "Aesthetic Advisor", to bring artistic unity and vision to its built environment.

Van der Mey's major commission, the 1912 cooperative-commercial Scheepvaarthuis (Shipping House), is considered the starting point of the movement, and the three of them collaborated on that building. The most Amsterdam School buildings are found in this city. The movement and its followers played an important role in Berlage's overall plans for the expansion of Amsterdam.

The most important architects and virtuoso artists of the Amsterdam School were Michel de Klerk and Piet Kramer. Other members included Jan Gratama (who gave it its name), Berend Tobia Boeyinga, P. H. Endt, H. Th. Wijdeveld, J. F. Staal, C. J. Blaauw, and P. L. Marnette. The journal Wendingen ("Windings" or "Changes"), published between 1918 and 1931, was the magazine of the Amsterdam School movement.

After de Klerk died in 1923, the style lost its importance. The De Bijenkorf Store in The Hague by Piet Kramer from 1926 is considered to be the last example of "classic" Amsterdam School Expressionism.

The influence of the Amsterdam School continued in the Dutch East Indies, where one of its leading proponents was the pioneering Indonesian architect Liem Bwan Tjie.

== Interior design ==
The Amsterdam School style spread beyond architecture to encompass interior design, with the result that items ranging from furniture and carpets to lamps and clocks were produced. Interest revived in the 1970s as well as at the beginning of the 21st century.

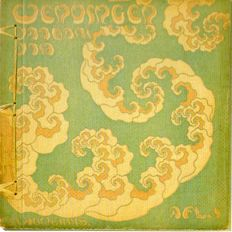
'Wendingen' 1918–1932, Dutch architecture and art magazine. Main theme: Expressionist architecture (Amsterdam School, de Klerk, Kramer, Mendelsohn, Finsterlin, Feininger et al.). Movement against 'De Stijl' in 1917.

Video and commentary by Hendrik Wijdeveld (in Dutch)

== Bibliography ==
- Wim de Wit, The Amsterdam School - Dutch Expressionist Architecture 1915-1930, The MIT Press, Cambridge Mass. 1983
- Maristella Casciato, The Amsterdam School, 010 Publishers, Rotterdam 1991
- Joseph Buch, A Century of Architecture in The Netherlands, NAI Publishers, Rotterdam 1995
- Martijn F. Le Coultre, Wendingen 1918-1932, V+K Publishing, Blaricum 2001 [Dutch edition]
- Wendingen, Dutch architecture and art magazine. Expressionist architecture is the main theme: Amsterdam School (de Klerk, Kramer), Mendelsohn, Finsterlin, Feininger et al. Edited in Amsterdam and Santpoort, 1918–1932. Countermovement to the De Stijl movement in 1917.
