= MS Pieter Corneliszoon Hooft =

Dutch ocean liner (1925–1932)

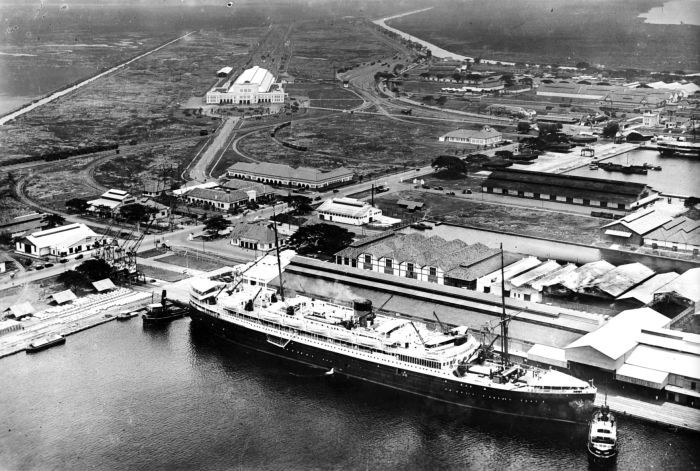
- The Pieter Corneliszoon Hooft in Batavia after the 1930 refit

History

Netherlands
- Name: Pieter Corneliszoon Hooft
- Namesake: Pieter Corneliszoon Hooft
- Owner: Stoomvaart Maatschappij Nederland
- Port of registry: Amsterdam
- Route: Amsterdam – Java
- Builder: Ateliers et Chantiers de la Loire, Saint-Nazaire
- Yard number: 256
- Launched: 1925, Saint-Nazaire
- Completed: July 1926, Amsterdam
- In service: 23 July 1926
- Out of service: 14 November 1932
- Refit: 1931
- Identification: code letters PQFV
- Fate: Burnt out, later scrapped

General characteristics
- Type: ocean liner
- Tonnage: 1927: 14,642 GRT, 10,432 NRT; 1932: 14,729 GRT, 8,713 NRT
- Length: 540 ft (164.59 m) LWL (1926–1931); 521.8 ft (159.04 m) p/p (1926–1931); 534 ft (162.76 m) p/p (1931–32); 548 ft (167.03 m) LWL (1931–32); 534.0 ft (162.76 m) (1931–32)
- Beam: 68.1 ft (20.76 m)
- Draft: 28 ft 11 in (8.81 m)
- Depth: 35.0 ft (10.67 m)
- Depth of hold: 38 ft 6 in (11.73 m)
- Decks: 6
- Propulsion: 2 × 8-cylinder Sulzer diesel engines 8,000 hp (6,000 kW) (1926–1931); 2 × 9-cylinder Sulzer diesel engines 14,000 hp (10,000 kW) (1931–1932)
- Speed: 17 knots (31 km/h) (first trial); 15.5 knots (28.7 km/h) (1926–1931); 18 knots (33 km/h) (1931–1932)
- Capacity: 580 passengers
- Crew: 300

Pieter Corneliszoon Hooft was a Dutch ocean liner built in 1925. An onboard fire destroyed her passenger accommodation before she was completed. In 1932, another fire damaged her so severely that she was sold for scrapping, only to catch fire again before she was scrapped.

== Ordering ==
=== The MSN and the NSM ===
MS Pieter Corneliszoon Hooft was built for the Stoomvaart Maatschappij Nederland (SMN). SMN had been founded in 1870 and its core business was the transport between the Netherlands and the Dutch East Indies. Later the line added other destinations in the Pacific, e.g., from Java to the West Coast of the US, and even a line from Java to New York. The ships that carried passengers had to be fast and comfortable. For building these, and many other ships the SMN required, SMN had a long-standing relationship with the Nederlandsche Scheepsbouw Maatschappij (NSM), which had built all the SMN ships since c. 1905.

=== The order and French currency depreciation ===
Between 1922 and 1926 the French Franc lost 43% of its value. From 1921 to 1926 there was a severe international crisis in shipbuilding. In 1923 the SMN then tendered the construction of a very large ship, the later Pieter Corneliszoon Hooft. The offers that came in were: Fijenoord and Wilton shipyard combination for 6,200,000 guilders; De Schelde and Wilton combination for 6,400,000; NSM 6,600,000 counting as 6,270,000 guilders due to a contract between NSM and SMN. The NSM still beat the other Dutch shipyards, because it offered a significantly faster delivery. The NSM had offered at cost price because construction would keep 1,000 employees occupied for a year.

The French shipyard Société des Ateliers et Chantiers de la Loire (ACL) offered for 4,900,000 guilders. Its offer was for two months later delivery, which counted for 50,000 guilders. The additional cost for distance, transport etc. was also budgeted as 50,000 by the SMN. Possible support by the government and municipality was not sure and thought to be maximum 450,000. All in all the difference between the offer of the NSM and Ateliers et Chantiers de la Loire was 6,270,000 - 4,900,000 - 50,000 - 50,000 - 450,000 = 820,000 guilders. This was such a significant amount that the SMN decided to give the order to Ateliers et Chantiers de la Loire.

The English competition had also been invited to offer for P.C. Hooft. Indeed, the majority of the 19 offers came from shipyards from the United Kingdom. However, all of these bids except one, were equal to or higher than the Dutch offers. It is remarkable that when the first bids had come in, the SMN contacted the NSM for a second bid in case it could not agree on the payment in French Francs and the delivery term. During the Christmas week of 1923 the SMN had negotiated with the government for the 450,000 subsidy. In that same week the NSM had negotiated with its suppliers to make a new offer, which still remained 4% (15% according to the SMN) above the French offer. However, the negotiations with ACL about payment and delivery succeeded, and so the new offer of the NSM could not be considered.

The fact that so much work went to a French shipyard created a row in the Dutch press and House of Representatives. The affair was even mentioned in the British parliament. In general politics and media agreed that currency competition was to blame. More extreme points of view blamed it on the recently restricted labor hours, or on the SMN wanting to teach Dutch laborers a lesson. In fact a longer workweek could not have bridged the gap between the bids, and the fact that the SMN saved 820,000 guilders by accepting the French offer cannot be denied.

== Construction ==
=== Société des Ateliers et Chantiers de la Loire ===
The Société des Ateliers et Chantiers de la Loire (ACL) was a shipyard of far more renown than any Dutch shipyard. It consisted of two companies at different locations. In Nantes there was a shipyard that could employ up to 3,000 men. It had four slipways of 135 – 165 m length. It had built many torpedo boats, gunboats, light cruisers and the like. In Saint-Nazaire there was a shipyard that could employ up to 2,000 men. It had five slipways suitable to build bigger ships. It was favorably located near the floating docks of Penhoët and the metal works Forges de Trignac. The ACL Saint-Nazaire had a factory in Saint-Denis near Paris for the construction of turbines and explosion engines. Except for the engine factory, all locations could be modernized.

At the Saint-Nazaire location, ACL had built many battleships and even two dreadnoughts. These dreadnoughts were bigger than P.C. Hooft and had far more powerful machines, so there is no reason to doubt the technical skill of the ACL. However that may be, the February 1922 Washington Naval Treaty made any battleship construction very unlikely for the near future. The logical alternative was to build big merchant ships. While many ocean liners had been built in Saint-Nazaire, this had not been done by the ACL, but by the Ateliers et Chantiers de Saint-Nazaire Penhoët also located in Saint-Nazaire, and only separated from it by a wall.

=== The work progresses ===
Pieter Corneliszoon Hooft was laid down as yard number 256. The ship was launched on 23 April 1925. Present were: Jhr. mr. A. Röell governor of North-Holland and member of the supervisory board of the SMN; Mr. Oderwald and Mr. Tegelberg, both member of the executive board of the SMN; Mr. Visker, chief engineer of the SMN; Joseph Asscher president of the Dutch Chamber of Commerce in Paris; Mr. Glaser French trade representative in The Hague; as well as many persons from the French ship building industry. In his speech the president of the ACL Mr. Naud recalled the crisis in the shipping industry: the surplus of merchant ships, the low freight prices, decreasing international transport, and finally the Washington treaties. It all made that the ACL had been extremely satisfied with the order for P.C. Hooft. Naud continued by naming some of the ships built by ACL Saint-Nazaire, mentioning the dreadnought France, and the ocean liners Sphinx, Compiègne, Chantilly and Fontainebleau of Messageries Maritimes, and Lipari of Chargeurs Réunis. P.C. Hooft would be the biggest of these ocean liners. P.C. Hooft was christened by Mrs. Hooft-Labouchère a descendant from P.C. Hooft.

=== Delays ===
The original plan was that P.C. Hooft would make her trial trip to Amsterdam in September 1925. Due to a short strike this was delayed till October, and the first trip to the East Indies was re-planned to the second half of November, most probably 21 November. By 19 November it was known that this date would also not be met. The alleged cause was a lack of skilled laborers. The first trip to Java was then thought to leave in the second half of May 1925. In mid-December 1925 the engines had been installed, all rivetting had been done, and the cabins, saloons and the like were getting finished. I was thought that the ship would be finished at the end of January or early February 1926, with the SMN hoping for delivery in February.

=== On fire at the ACL shipyard ===
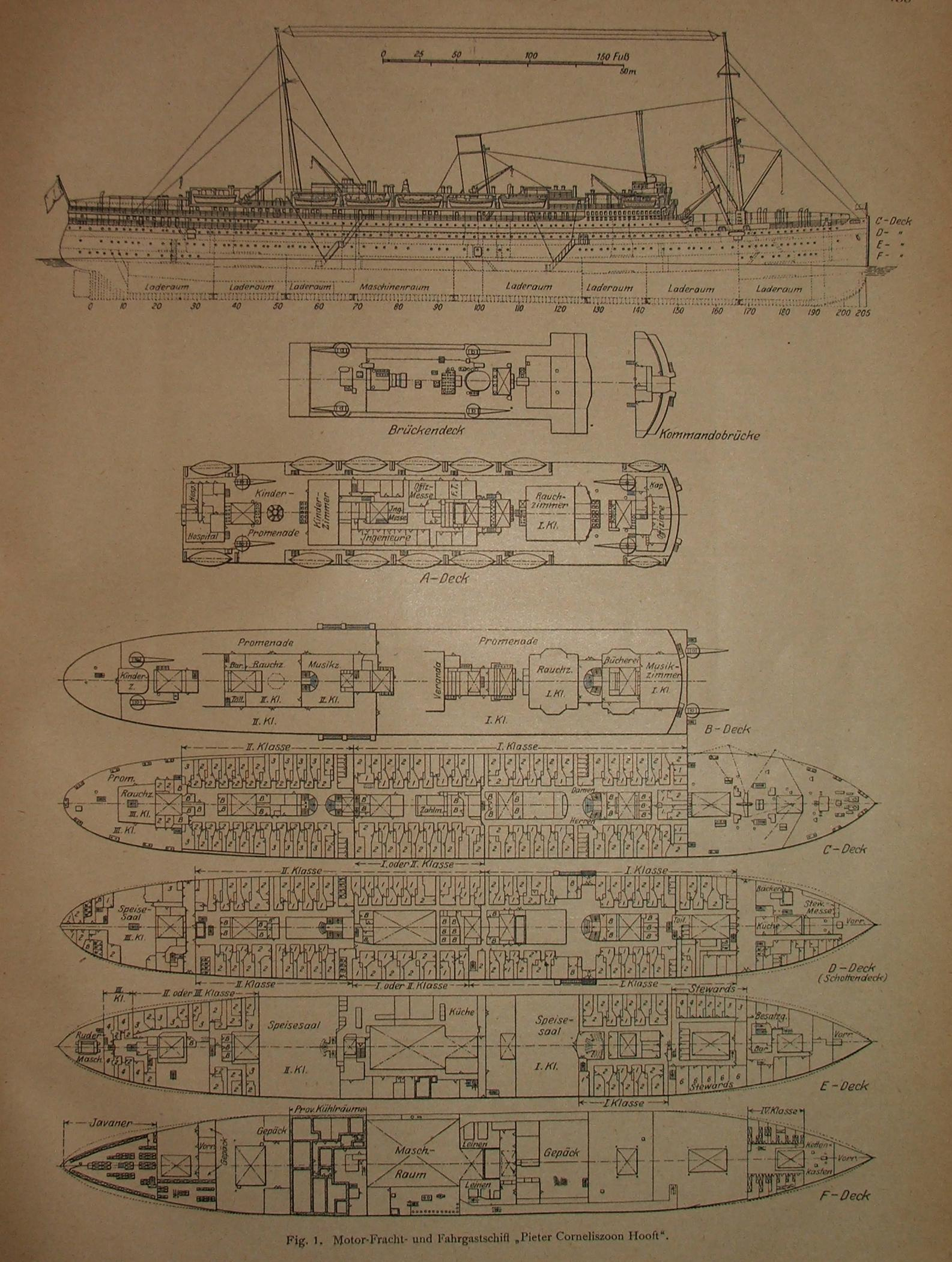
Deck plan of Pieter Corneliszoon Hooft

On 20 December 1925, a little more than a month before her expected completion a fire broke out on board ship. while P.C. Hooft was still being finished at the ACL shipyard. This major fire erupted at 10 AM and was quenched at noon, but the damage was very substantial. Deck A (cf. the deck plan), where the cabins for the officers were, had to be removed completely. The saloons on deck B and about 40 cabins on deck C were destroyed. Repairs would take 10–12 months, delaying delivery with half year. In money the damage was estimated at 1,000,000 French Francs. The works of art had not been damaged, and the decoration of the music saloon was save, because it had not yet been placed. A later investigation did not find a cause for the fire. It did find the body of a guard in the hold. He had a broken neck vertebra, and one suspected that he fell while on his way to report the fire. As a consequence, the fire could get so big.

=== Completed in Amsterdam ===
On midnight in the night of 20–21 July 1926 tugboats brought P.C. Hooft from the shipyard to open sea, where the compass was corrected. At 9 AM she left Saint-Nazaire for Amsterdam. The initial plan to do the trial run on this trip had been dropped for an official trial run in August. In the morning of 23 July she arrived in IJmuiden at 10 AM. A correspondent was on board for the occasion, and noted that it all went according to plan. At 2 PM the ship was in Amsterdam. She was moored at the Javakade on Java-eiland where the SMN was based. Mr. Oderwald, of the Board of SMN was the first to enter ship, followed by the board members Mr. van Hengel and Mr. Koning. Captain Schippers reported a speed of 17 knots, and a very favorable stability.

Everything seemed to end well for P.C. Hooft, but three weeks after her arrival in Amsterdam the tone was less jubilant. The 'Metaalbewerker', a magazine of the metal workers union, was the first to report that the ship had been docked immediately after arrival in port. Most of the interior carpentry still had to be done, and there was as much iron work still in primer as was already painted. Only a small part of the technical and sanitary installations was ready. Hundreds of laborers were working day and night to finish her in time for the first voyage to Java on 31 August.

In view of the whole ordering process the affair was a bit embarrassing for the SMN and ACL. Mr. Tegelberg of the SMN told reporters that the delivery of a ship in such an unfinished state was: 'indeed an exceptional case of a special character'. 'The SMN absolutely required that the ship would be ready for the planned trip on 31 August. The lines to the East Indies were very busy, and all of the 2nd and third class tickets had already been sold. While the work of the ACL was of the very high quality required for warships, it was not experienced in building passenger ships of this size and quality. The SMN had therefore conferred with ACL, and ACL had agreed that the ship would be finished in Amsterdam. In Amsterdam there were many laborers available from the NSM, the SMN and other suppliers, making that the ship could be finished quicker. ACL would pay for the work in Amsterdam.'

== Characteristics ==
=== Dimensions ===
As built, the waterline length of Pieter Corneliszoon Hooft was 540 ft (164.59 m), and the length between perpendiculars was 521.8 ft (159.04 m), the beam was 68.1 ft (20.76 m), the depth of hold till deck D was 38 ft 6 in (11.73 m), the maximum draught was 28 ft 11 in (8.81 m) in summer, empty it was14 ft 11 in (4.55 m) Construction displacement was 21,093 tons, maximum displacement 21,863 tons, and empty it was 10,330 tons all measured in 1016 kg tons. Gross register tonnage was 14,642, and net register tonnage was 10,432.

The big beam was judged to have given the P.C. Hooft her high stability. There were nine watertight bulkheads in the ship, with the ship planned to stay afloat when two compartments were flooded. Above the D-Deck there were four fire-turning bulkheads.

The 1930–31 refit aimed to increase the speed of P.C. Hooft. Tests in a ship model basin pointed out that her hull would generate a too pronounced bow wave at speeds of over 16.5 knots. Therefore, the bow was cut off at the first bulkhead, and a new 8 feet longer bow was made. This made the entry angles of the water much better, and reduced the bow wave to more acceptable proportions. After the rebuild her waterline length was 548 feet (167.03 m) and her length between perpendiculars was 534 feet (162.76 m). The rebuild changed her tonnages to 14,729 GRT and 8,713 NRT.

=== Machinery ===
Pieter Corneliszoon Hooft was powered by two two-stroke 8-cylinder diesel engines manufactured by Sulzer of Winterthur, Switzerland. These engines each developed 4,000 horsepower (3,000 kW) at 100 turns a minute. The cylinder diameter was 680 mm with a 1,200 mm stroke. The crankshafts had a diameter of 460 mm. The machines were to give P.C. Hooft a speed of 15.5 knots (28.7 km/h). While she steamed from Saint-Nazaire to be completed in Amsterdam, she was claimed to have made 17 knots, but higher speeds were quite normal for a ship that was not finished and not fully loaded. On her official trial run just before her first voyage to the East Indies, she steamed at 15 kn.

The 1930-1931 refit that aimed to increase the speed of P.C. Hooft obviously required more engine power. The power required was calculated with the help of tests in a ship model basin. These resulted in a required power of 14,000 horsepower (10,000 kW). The new engines chosen were also a Sulzer type. It was higher and longer and had 9 cylinders. The extra cylinder was important, but it was outweighed by the new type of cylinder. The increased height allowed a longer stroke of the cylinders, 1,340 mm stroke instead of 1,200 mm. The diameter of the cylinders was 760 mm instead of 680 mm. A final measure was to increase the revolutions per minute from 115 to 130. This was high for such big machines, but the trial run as well the first trip proved that the careful balancing that had been done prevented vibrations.

In order to make place for the bigger engines significant changes had to be made to the ship. The engine room had to be extended towards the front, which deleted some of the fuel bunkers. Higher up on decks E some rooms / space also became part of the engine room. Further up some bathrooms and other spaces were taken by the higher width of the new funnel. A far more significant, but less visible change was the strengthening of the machine foundations. The foundation was lengthened, the number of beams under the engines was doubled, and the transverse foundation was also made more rigid. The heavier machines also required new line shafting, that was made by RDM. The new bronze propellers were made by Blohm+Voss

On the port side were three two-stroke auxiliary diesel engines. Each had four 380 mm cylinders with a 660 mm stroke, generating 520 hp at 170 turns a minute. Each drove a direct current 325 KW 220 V dynamo made by 'N.V. Electrotechnische Industrie v.h. Willem Smit & Co' from Slikkerveer. These engines were important because all machines on board were driven by electricity. On starboard was a small 100 hp engine that could either drive an air compressor, or a 75 KW Dynamo. This was probably the small dynamo for lighting when the ship was in port. During the refit it was replaced by an auxiliary engine of 300 hp directly connected to an auxiliary compressor of 1,080m3/h. The last engine was a 12 hp emergency engine that could drive a compressor.

The electrification of the ship would be done by Firma Groeneveld, Van de Pol & Co. from Amsterdam. This company would install 146 km of cable.

The oil bunkers had a capacity of 2,010 tons. Standard procedure was to fuel up in Surabaya, and to use this fuel for the trip to the Netherlands and back again to Surabaya. In the details the ports of Sabang and Belawan also played a part. The entrance to Belawan was a bit shallow, and so the final big fuel intake before sailing to the Netherlands was done at Sabang. During the refit some fuel bunkers became part of the engine room, and some water ballast tanks were re-purposed as fuel bunkers, increasing capacity to c. 2,500 tons.

=== Accommodation ===
As built Pieter Corneliszoon Hooft had accommodation for 253 first class, 300 second class, 104 third class and 54 fourth class passengers. A better count is that of the cabins. There were 1st and 2nd class cabins for 520 passengers, part of these cabins could be used for either class. Third class and fourth class cabins could house 60 people each. There were two luxury cabins, made by Firma Reens, and a number of semi-luxury cabins, that could be assigned private bathrooms. On average there was one bathroom for every 10 persons. Almost all cabins had a porthole (cf. deck plan), something very important for travel in the tropics. The fourth class was a special case. The only people using it were soldiers below the rank of sergeant, and in case the government put them on board, temporary lodgings were made for them.

The crew consisted of 262 men. The officers were: the commander, the 1st, 2nd, 3rd and 4th Navigator; a chief engineer, a second engineer, 7 other engineers and 4 assistant engineers, a wireless telegraphist, a doctor a medic and a nurse. Other staff were the administrative officer, maître d'hotel, etc.

The decoration of the first class saloons was designed by Carel Adolph Lion Cachet, who had also done previous ships of the SMN. The carpentry of the conversation rooms (Smoking lounges, Music room, and library) would be made by the N.V. Nederlandsche Fabriek van Betimmeringen v/h Gebr. Reens. The decoration of the second class saloons was done by the firm Marc Simon from Paris.

== Service ==
=== Official trial run to Wight ===
On Friday 27 August 1926 the official trial run of P.C. Hooft could finally start. She had already been loaded with the cargo for the East Indies, when a very select company started to board: Prince Henry of the Netherlands was the most prominent guest, he was accompanied by the Colonial minister J.C. Koningsberger, the vice-president of the Council of State Wilhelmus Frederik van Leeuwen, Jhr. mr. dr. A. Röell governor of North-Holland, the mayor of Amsterdam W. de Vlugt and Mrs. de Vlugt-Flentrop, the executive board of the SMN, some members of the supervisory board of the SMN, and many other prominent people from the finance and trade sector. At 6:30 pm the ship left the Java Kade. Whilst it sailed to IJmuiden the 300 guests went to dinner. The speech in the first class was made by S.P. van Eeghen of Van Eeghen & Co, in the second class it was made by C.J.K. van Aalst of the Netherlands Trading Society. At 10:00 pm P.C. Hooft was at the big (later middle) lock in IJmuiden, where customs made that passage took an hour. Meanwhile, an orchestra played for the guests. The organization of the trial run had been planned extremely well. The guests lunched and dined alternately in the first and second class. The cabins had postal cards and well-illustrated booklets about the ship.

At 11:30 on Friday night, the Wijsmuller tug Nestor arrived to pull the ship from the lock to open sea. At 10:00 am on the 28th P.C. Hooft passed Dover., with Folkestone and Cap Gris Nez in view. The Hooft then passed Dungeness and steered for Beachy Head, and then Wight and Portsmouth. The Hooft rounded Wight counter-clockwise, and then made some maneuvers as a test. On Saturday evening there was another formal dinner that lasted till about two o'clock in the night. The Hooft arrived back in IJmuiden at 12 o'clock on Sunday the 29th.

=== First trip on the Amsterdam - Java route ===
P.C. Hooft was used on the Amsterdam–Java route. Her first trip started on 31 August 1926, just two days after she had returned from the trip to Wight. The plan was to arrive in Tanjung Priok on 1 October. On 27 September arrived in Sabang and on 29 September P.C. Hooft arrived in Belawan port of Medan. On 1 October the ship arrived in Batavia. On 2 October she made a tour of the bay of Batavia with 1,200 guests. On 3 October she sailed to Cirebon with 30 guests and a reporter. On 13 October the arrived in P.C. Hooft Probolinggo. On the way back she visited Medan for a formal dinner there. From Bilawan P.C. Hooft sailed to Port Said in 13 days. On 19 November the ship arrived back in Amsterdam.

=== The ship becomes too slow ===
When she entered service in 1926 P.C. Hooft had been one of the first big ocean liners with diesel engine propulsion. Her cruise speed of 15+ knots was satisfactory for the voyage to the East Indies. Later this speed was raised somewhat by increasing the revolutions per minute of engines. However, in a few developments in Diesel engine construction made that the ship became too slow. While P.C. Hooft made 15+ knots, Christiaan Huijgens made 17+ knots, and the newer Oldebarneveld and Marnix made 18 knots. A difference in cruising speed between 15.5 knots and 17.5 knots might not seem a big deal. However, on a route that took a month's travel time, these few knots meant c. 4 days less on board ship. The guests probably did not care that much about a few days, except that they would want to pay a somewhat lower price. For the shipping line, every extra day of travel meant extra costs (i.e. 1,000 men on board) and the need to ask a higher fare price that the passenger did not want to pay. Meanwhile, the line could not use the ship to transport other people.

=== Refit: re-engined and lengthened ===
In late 1929 the SMN decided to increase the speed of P.C. Hooft. A decision to perform a major refit on a new ship is always rather awkward, but in fact this decision was counter-intuitive. Mr. Delprat of the SMN declared that for a five-year-old ship like P.C. Hooft the investment to increase the speed was justified, but for older ships like SS Jan Pieterszoon Coen and SS Johan de Wit it was not. The refit that was to increase the speed of P.C. Hooft consisted of two big alterations. 1) The machine power would be almost doubled. 2) The hull was changed so the ship could profit from the increased power. The change was announced in April 1930. On 3 December 1930 P.C. Hooft left Amsterdam for Rotterdam, where the Rotterdamsche Droogdok Maatschappij would execute the refit.

On 25 March 1931, the refit P.C. Hooft left Rotterdam for trials on the North Sea. These trials were planned to last about one and a half days, with the ship arriving in Amsterdam on the 27th. A defect in the propeller shaft made that she returned to Rotterdam on the 25th. She was placed in drydock, where the defect was found to be that the gland made too much contact with the propeller shaft. The defect was quickly fixed, and in the evening of the 27th P.C. Hooft resumed her trials. On the North Sea P.C. Hooft reached 18 knots during the important full power run. At 4 o'clock in the afternoon of the 28th she reached IJmuiden. During lunch SMN accepted delivery, and also thanked her chief engineer Ir. S.G. Visker and her shipbuilding engineer Ir. Prins for their advice and design of the refit.

== The ship is destroyed by fire ==
=== The ship is decontaminated ===
On Tuesday, 8 November 1932 P.C. Hooft had returned to Amsterdam from the East Indies. The ship was moored at Sumatra Kade and all passengers and cargo were unloaded. In the evening of 12 November, all external opening of the ship were closed by the decontamination service. On 13 November that service spent the whole day treating the ship against rats. This was done using hydrogen cyanide, and with external openings closed to let the poison do its work. After the gas assumed to have done its work, all possible measures were taken to quickly purge the ship of the highly poisonous gas. Therefore, all the ship and the doors, including all cabin doors and portholes had been opened from 6 PM. The operation was marked by a yellow flag with three crosses, which flew from the foremast. The flag marked that the ship had been gassed, and nobody should enter it. Therefore, there was not even a guard on board.

=== A fire destroys the ship ===
In the night of 13–14 November 1932 at about 12:20 am, a fire was noted on the boat deck behind the bridge by guards walking on shore. Another guard had entered the ship in the previous evening at about 10:15 pm in order to power up the dynamo, the fans and the ventilation system. At about the same time as the guards on shore, he had noted the fire in the first class cabins behind the bridge. No wonder that a short circuit in the ventilators would later be thought to have caused the fire.

The fire spread very quickly. It was not stopped by closed doors and bulkheads, and was aided by an eastern wind blowing through the open corridors, creating a chimney effect. Soon the saloons were on fire, and soon after the first class stairs were, soon followed by the first class dining room and the bridge. By 1:00 am the whole midships was ablaze. The fire department in Amsterdam was very capable to handle these kinds of events. It used the vessels Jason and Jan van der Heyden, that could both put an enormous amount of water on a fire. The normal fire department also used an enormous amount of equipment, and so over 40 fire hoses were used. In spite of this, the fire department was rather ineffective because the hydrogen cyanide prevented her from entering the ship. Attempts to extinguish the fire from the waterboard, from shore, or from the decks did nothing to stop the fire eating away on the inside. There was so much water put on the ship, that is listed, but water in the hold did not put out a fire higher up in the ship.

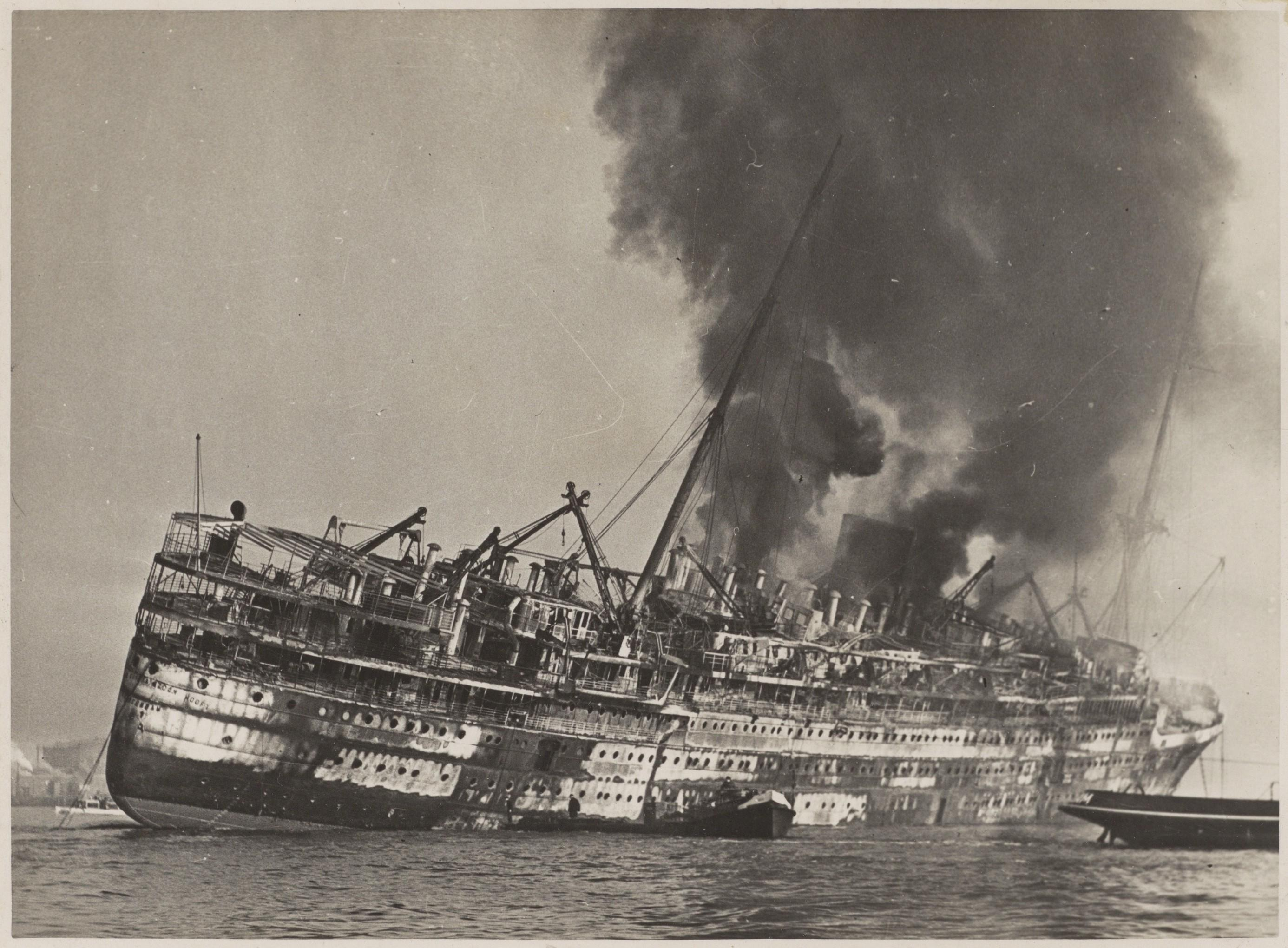
P.C. Hooft burning near Schellingwoude

At 2:30 AM the rear of the ship also started to burn, and the fight was lost. Now the SMN and the fire department wanted to prevent the burning ship from causing damage on shore. A scenario that would be very likely once the fire reached the 1,000 tons of fuel stored at the bottom of the ship. Moving the ship meant stopping the attempts to extinguish the fire, but it had to be done before the fire reached the (upwind) bow of the ship, otherwise the ship could not lower its anchors on the IJ. At 3:45 am five tugboats started to pull P.C. Hooft backwards, with only three men on board near the anchors. At 4:00 am tugboats start to pull the burning ship eastwards to the compass buoys near Schellingwoude, on the north side of the IJ. At 4:30 it arrived there, just as the oil bunkers were catching fire. Here it was left to burn out On 17 November the fire then increased in intensity again. By then, the stern had sunk to the bottom of the IJ, but the bow was still afloat thanks to the bulkheads. On 21 November a last fire erupted, and after quenching it, the fire department declared that the fire had ended. This proved still too optimistic, because on 22 November a locked in fire of burning oil was found in the bow section. After this had been eliminated the fire had lasted for 232 hours, or almost ten days.

After the fire had been put out the owners and the insurers could rather quickly determine that the ship was a total loss. At the time P.C. Hooft was insured for 7,500,000 guilders. 80% at Anglo-Dutch insurers, and 20% at own risk. On 25 November the insurers agreed to pay the full amount of 6,000,000 guilders to the SMN, and declared that they did not want to have the wreck.

=== Second fire on the wreck ===
By 24 November divers from Wijsmuller were fixing holes in the hull of P.C. Hooft. Meanwhile, pumps were trying to remove an estimated 16,000 tons of water from the hull. Employees of RDM meanwhile closed up portholes with iron plating in case the ship would suddenly list further. On 8 December about 40 employees of SMN were working on the wreck. One of the things they did was cutting holes to bring in pumps ever closer to the water line (which was lowered as the ship rose out of the water). In order to reach a tank that was full of water, the employees tried to cut off an oil pipeline with a blowtorch. A spark from the blowtorch hit some oil rests, and by 10:00 am the ship was burning from oil in one of the bunkers on starboard. As a consequence all employees were required to leave the ship again. This fire was quenched on 9 December.

=== To the ship breakers ===
By 6 December the wreck had been sold to N.V. Simons Scheepssloperij in Pernis near Rotterdam. Because the ship breakers were on the Meuse, the wreck had to be moved over the North Sea. Therefore, a lot of precautions had to be taken against it sinking somewhere on a busy shipping lane or canal. On 10 December at 10:00 am the wreck was brought into the Prins Hendrik dok of the Amsterdamsche Droogdok Maatschappij to make her fit for transport. While the wreck had entered the drydock it listed 14 degrees, and could not be lifted. Mr. W.H. Mellema of Maritiem Kantoor W.H. Mellema en Co led the work to straighten the ship. After working with four of his men for 36 hours they succeeded in reducing the list to four degrees. Now a slow process of lifting the ship a bit and pumping out water began. At noon on 12 December, this process stopped because divers noted that the keel was not straight anymore. This meant that it was impossible to get the whole ship on the blocks. This would so much pressure at particular points of the dock that the dock would be endangered.

By 5:00 pm on the 12th the ship had been lifted till a position that could not harm the dock. In the midships 200 feet of the keel was supported by the blocks. 160 feet of the bow was not on the blocks. The stern touched the blocks, but was not supported by them. It showed that the midships had sagged during the fire. However, all significant leaks were above water by then, and so they could be fixed quickly. On the 13th all stop gap repairs were also reinforced and tested. The plan was that in the morning of the 14th all leaks would be sufficiently closed, so the ship could be moved over sea.

In the morning of 14 December the Prins Hendrik dok was lowered at 8:30 am, and by 9:15 am P.C. Hooft was floating. At 9:30 four tugboats of the company 'Gebroeders Goedkoop' took the ship in tow. The ship now listed only 2.5 degrees. 128 holes above the waterline had been carefully closed. The draught of the ship had been reduced to 15 feet front and 20 feet aft, way less than normal. P.C. Hooft was expected in Ijmuiden at 2:00 pm, from where tugboats from Wijsmuller would tow her overseas to the Meuse. The departure from Amsterdam was a major event with many spectators. At about 11:15 P.C. Hooft passed the Hembrug. Shortly after 2:00 pm P.C. Hooft arrived in IJmuiden, where many had gathered to view the spectacle. The more powerful tugboats from Wijsmuller Hector, Drenthe and Utrecht took over the wreck, and shortly before 3:00 pm it left the IJmuiden locks. The tug Drenthe of 1,300 hp was on starboard, Utrecht of 800 hp on the port side. Hector of 500 hp was connected to the stern so the course of the wreck could be corrected. Stentor, a sister ship of Hector was also involved in getting the ship out to sea. The wreck continuously steered to port, and this required continuous which was very difficult in the confined space between the piers of IJmuiden. At 3:30 pm the convoy left the piers and was on open sea. Here Stentor returned to port. Hector left the stern of the wreck and was connected to Utrecht, so all three tugboats could pull the ship. Drenthe then extended her line to 160 m, Utrecht made hers even somewhat longer. Hector was a few hundred meters before Utrecht. Meanwhile, fog limited sight to only a few hundred meters, and the wreck had two red lights in the foremast advertising her condition. The convoy proceeded at 4 knots an hour while the foghorns sounded. At 8:30 PM it passed Katwijk, and at 9:45 PM Scheveningen. Shortly before 11:00 pm the convoy was before the Nieuwe Waterweg. The plan was to enter the Nieuwe Waterweg at 4:00 am, during the last part of the flow, but this was forbidden by a telegram from Rijkswaterstaat.

While before the Nieuwe Waterweg at 9:00 am on the 15th the tugboats Utrecht and Drenthe started to shorten their lines. Meanwhile, the tugboat Rozenburg from L. Smit & Co and a tugboat from Rijkswaterstaat arrived. Hector and Rozenburg then connected to the stern of the wreck. At 10 AM the convoy started to steam to the Nieuwe Waterweg, with the wreck having a slightly increased list. It was ebb, but the increased current indeed aided in keeping the wreck under control. At 10:40 the convoy was between the piers. Many tourists had arrived to view the spectacle on shore or from small boats. In Maassluis, home of L. Smit & Co the ship sirens bade a last farewell to P.C. Hooft, and somewhat past 2:30 PM the convoy was before the small harbor of Pernis. Somewhat past 3 PM the wreck hit a stone dam, and got stuck, but was freed by the tugs in a few minutes. The convoy then started to enter the harbor.

In the office of Simons Scheepssloperij Mayor I. van Es held a complimentary speech praising the courage of the company in buying the wreck and creating much-needed work during the crisis. Mr. Simons had just thanked the mayor for his kind words, when a young girl entered the office yelling: Father they are taking him away again!. Mr. Simons immediately went outside and discovered that while the ship was entering port, the harbormaster, Mr. Verschoor van Nisse, had made objections, and had ordered the wreck to be anchored somewhat more upstream near buoy 28. When the convoy had almost arrived there, Mr. Simons arrived in a fast boat and ordered the convoy to turn about. He got his way, and so the convoy again steered to the harbor, but now without the pilot, who was in the service of the municipality. At dusk, the convoy entered the harbor again and got stuck at high tide. Now the ship laid still with the bow in the harbor and the stern sticking out into the Nieuwe Maas. The harbormaster wanted to have it towed out again, but Mr. Simons objected, and called in his lawyer and two more tugboats. With the aid of the tugboats Titan and Minerva the wreck was brought somewhat further into the harbor, but by 18:30 the water had fallen further and these attempts had to be suspended.

A slightly less sensational version of the events was that the harbormaster had sounded the harbor and had advised beforehand that the wrecks should wait for high tide at buoy 28. The tugs had ignored the advice, but on getting stuck a first time, they had turned about. Then they had made a second attempt on Mr. Simons' orders, leading to the ship getting stuck with 35 m of the stern sticking out into the Nieuwe Maas.

In the evening of the 15th the wreck was secured to shore by a wire rope and all tugboats except Drenthe had left. Two hours after high tide the wreck then suddenly started to move on its own and to descend the Nieuwe Maas. The crew on the wreck succeeded in letting the anchor slip out, and Drenthe succeeded in connecting again, but it had traveled some distance before the ship stopped near Vlaardingen. Soon no less than nine tugboats were at work. The first thing that was done was to bring in a floating sheerleg so the anchor could be raised and cut off. The tugboats then had a hard time to keep the wreck under tow when a fierce wind started to grip the wreck. At 3:30 am the ship was almost out of control and two more tugboats were called in. In the morning of 16 December at 4:45 am 11 tugboats (four on the bow and seven on the stern) started the third attempt to bring P.C. Hooft into the breakers' port. Here the wreck succeeded in hitting the burned out hull of Volibilis, which was being broken up at Pernis. After Volubilis had been towed out, the sheerleg reattached the anchor, and so the wreck was secure at anchor in Pernis on 16 December.

=== A tourist attraction ===
Now the wreck lay in Pernis alongside Grotius of the SMN, which was also being broken up. In the last phase of her existence, the ship was as a tourist attraction. In the weekend of 17 December hundreds traveled to Pernis, but discovered that they could not enter the ship, because this was too dangerous without some measures. From 23 December the wreck would be open to visitors for two weeks, from 10 in the morning till 4:00 pm, including second Christmas Day, but excluding Sundays. The entree fee was 1 guilder, which went to the national crisis committee. The maritime tourist service Spido offered combined tickets for 1,40 guilders. On second Christmas Day no less than 1,200 people visited the wreck, and on the first Tuesday and Wednesday it were about 700. The last visits to the ship took place on Saturday 7 January. By then 3,700 people had visited the wreck.

The breakers, who had already sold many of the still usable parts of the ship then started the rough work on 9 January. There was a fire on 14 January. This was nothing special during ship breaking.

=== Analysis of the disaster ===
In a later analysis, some thought the cause of the fire to have been a spark from a short circuit in the lighting or fans. The reasons why the fire spread so rapidly were many: the chimney effect caused by the open doors, the fans (in the beginning), the ventilation system and the east wind (At 2:45 am firefighters that had entered the stern of the ship closed many doors, and that part of the ship burned much slower), and the high amount of carpentry in a passenger ship that fed the fire. The reason that the fire department could not extinguish the fire was primarily that while it was still limited, the fire department could not reach the fire. Putting water through a port hole generally put a cabin under water, but did not reach the burning core of the ship.

On 20 January 1933 a judicial authority, the Maritime Council (Raad voor de Scheepvaart) heard witnesses about the cause of the fire in Amsterdam. One of these was W.J. Muller, an inspector of the SMN. He declared that the fans in the saloons had not been used. The ventilators in the hull were used. This was not done normally, but in this case it was, because the ship needed to visit the drydock before her next trip. He specifically declared that the fans in the music saloon were never used in such a case. Mr. Vader from the decontamination service GGD (Municipal Health Service) declared that the gas used came in cans of Zyklon B, and was not flammable in the concentrations used. The engine room was not gassed. He stated that at noon 8 men remained on deck, and some of these did smoke now and then. At about 6 PM everything had been opened, and nobody remained on deck when the gas was leaving the ship. Mr. Vader thought a short circuit the most likely cause. Mr. Kalt of the port service declared that after he had let the engineer and donkeyman into the engine room, he went through the ship together with electrician Cornelissen and put on some fans. At 8 PM they left the ship again. The administrative officers sent in a letter declaring that multiple had taken place due to the fans in the smoking saloon and in cabins, but that these had been quenched by hand fire extinguishers. Electrician Cornelissen that in the engine room he engaged the dynamo, and the transformer for the ventilation system, so all fans in the holds and thermo tanks were on. Something he checked while he went through the ship with Mr. Kalt. Mr. Buigholt, fourth engineer of the ship was a bit more clear. The central ventilation system and heating had been put on, and when the fire had been discovered he had put it off. Later he went to the engine room to put off the dynamo. One of the owners of Groeneveld en v.d. Poll, who had installed the electricity made some statements about the fans. There were two kinds of fans on board: direct current and alternating current fans. Those in the hold were of the alternating current type. These had three fuses to protect against overcurrent, when these broke at a slightly different time, intense heat could be generated, and a fire could erupt. However, for that to happen the fan had to be near flammable material like wood, and that was not the case on P.C. Hooft. These fans were also not near the place were the fire broke out.

=== Legacy ===
Georges Philippar was built by the same shipyard which built P.C. Hooft. She was launched in November 1930, and burned and sank on returning from her maiden voyage in May 1932, only a few months before P.C. Hooft was lost. L'Atlantique, also built in Saint-Nazaire, was burned in January 1933, a few months after P.C. Hooft. The loss of P.C. Hooft was such a big disaster that it joined these ships in many disaster overviews.
