= Cachet (disambiguation) =

A cachet is a design or inscription other than a cancellation or pre-printed postage.

Cachet may also refer to:

== People ==
Given name

Surname

- Carel Adolph Lion Cachet (1864–1945), Dutch designer, printmaker and ceramist
- Louis Cachet (born 1973), Norwegian musician and murderer

== Other uses ==
- Cachet (horse), a racehorse
- Cachet, Markham, a neighbourhood of Markham, Ontario, Canada
- Reputation
- Seal (emblem), an impression printed on, embossed upon, or affixed to a document
  - Lettres de cachet, letters signed by the king of France, countersigned by one of his ministers, and closed with the royal seal
