= Wendingen =

Dutch architecture and art magazine

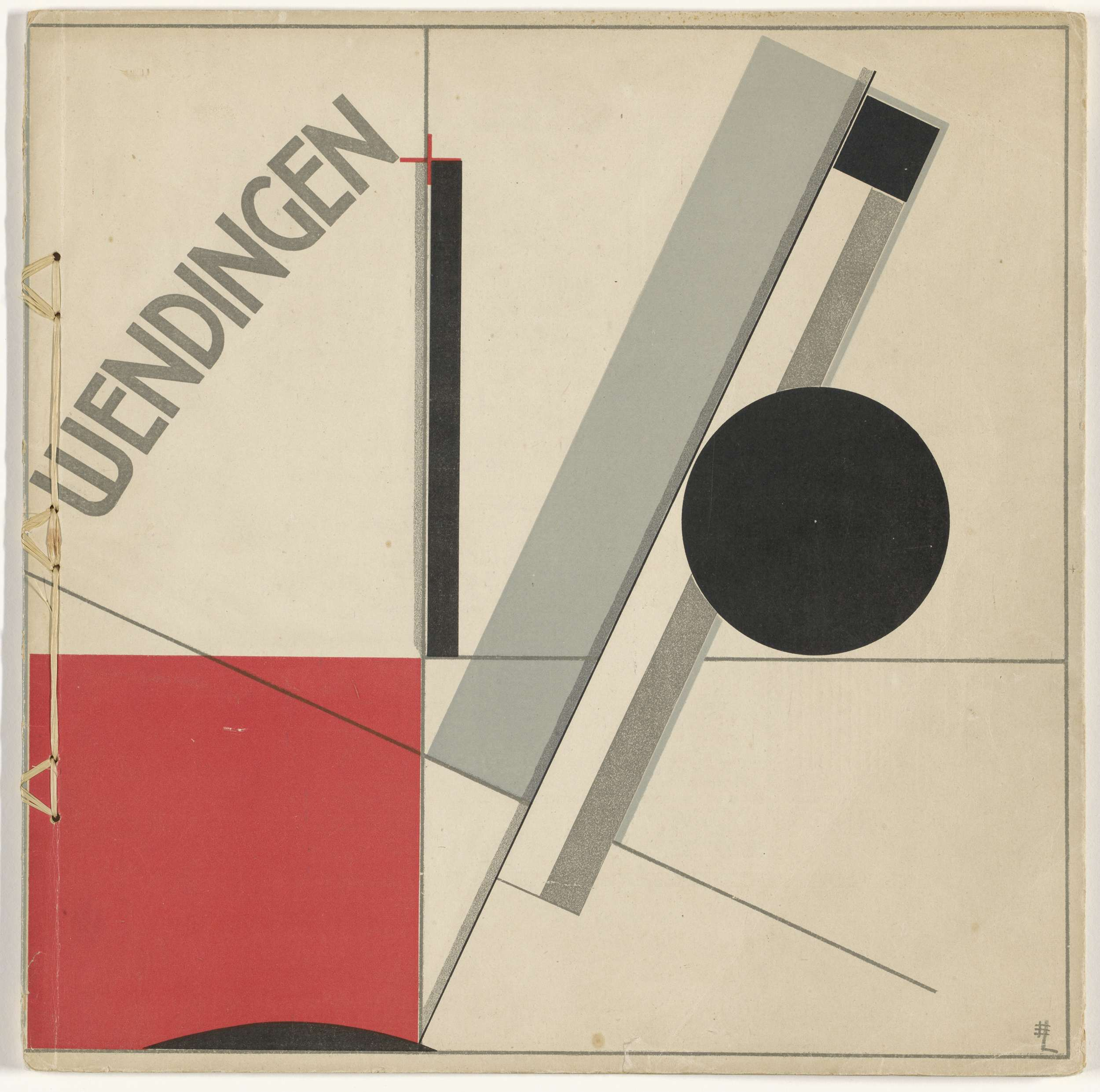
- Wendingen 1921-11, 1st of 8 F.L.Wright issues (cover El Lissitzky)
- Former editors: Hendricus Theodorus Wijdeveld
- Founded: 1918
- Country: Netherlands

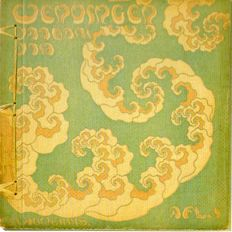
First issue 1918–1, architecture and art (cover J.L.M.Lauweriks). Wendingen main theme (expressionist architecture) against De Stijl in 1917 (cubist architecture).

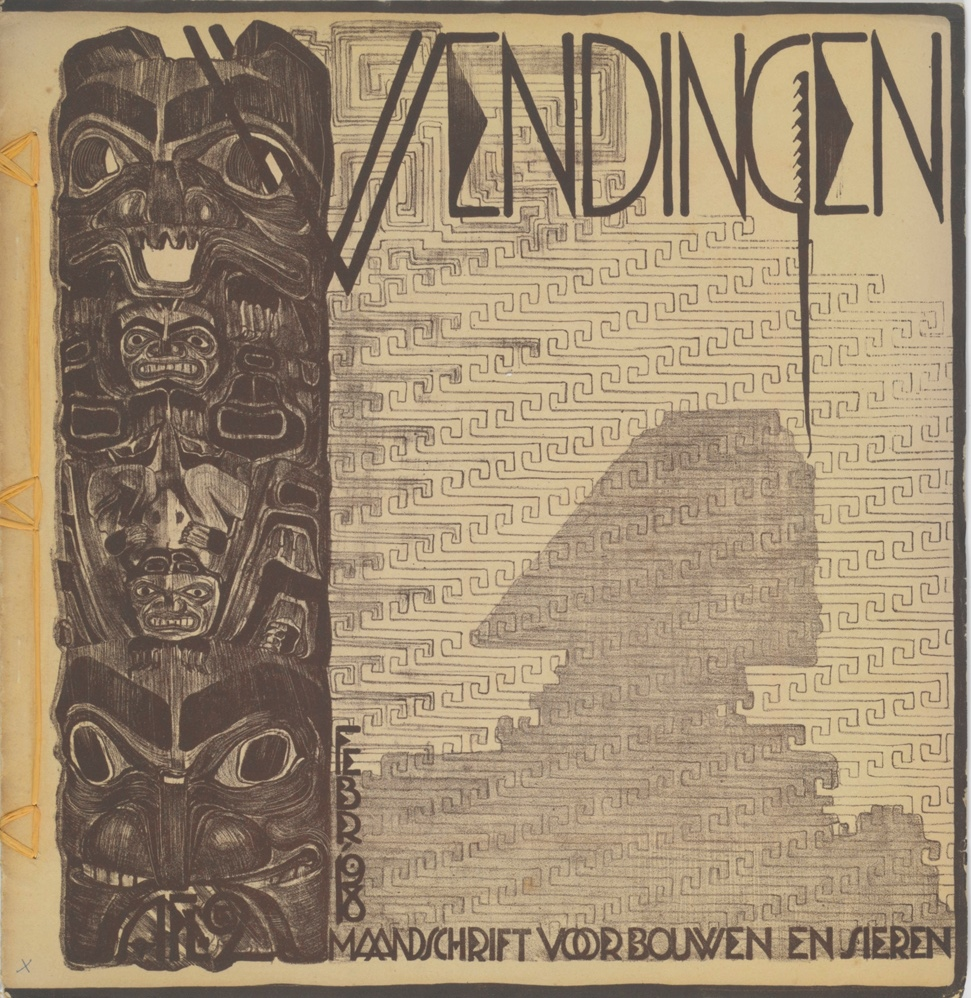
Wendingen 1918–2, architecture and art (cover M.de Klerk). M.de Klerk: 6 issues and 3 covers

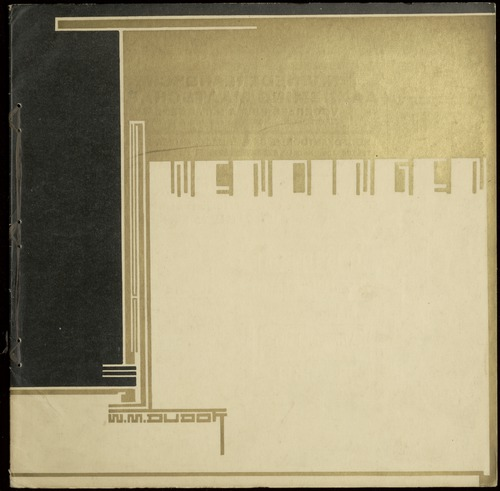
Wendingen 1928–1, 2nd of 4 W.M.Dudok issues (cover H.Wouda)

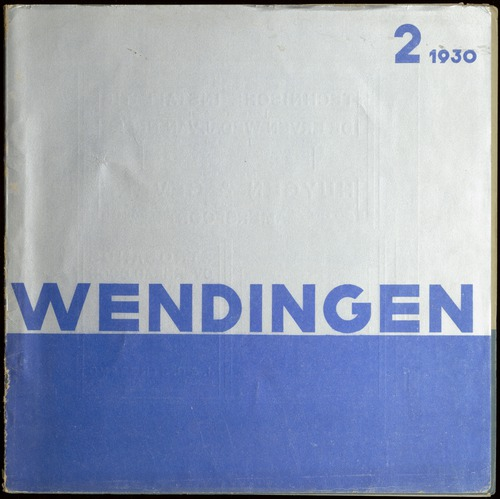
Wendingen 1930–2, Van Nelle Factory (cover L.v.d.Vlugt)

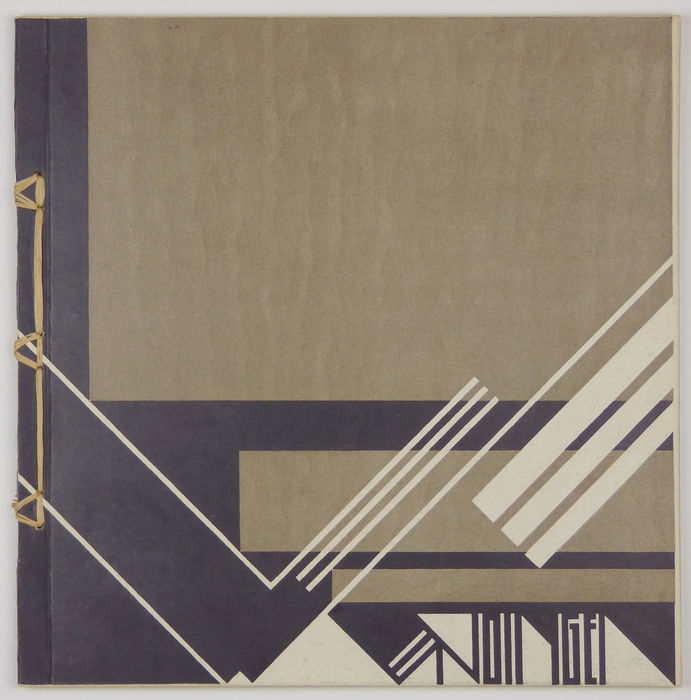
Wendingen 1921–12, J.Duiker & B.Bijvoet (cover J.Duiker)

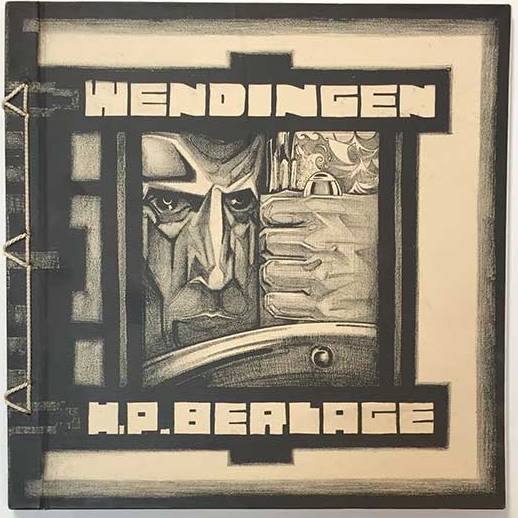
Wendingen 1920-11/12, H.P.Berlage (cover J.Jongert)

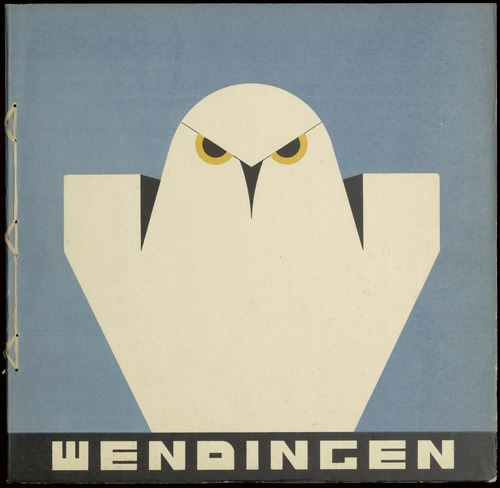
Wendingen 1931–1, cover by Samuel Jessurun de Mesquita

Wendingen (Dutch: Inversion or Upheaval, literally turns) was an architecture and art magazine that appeared from 1918 to 1932. It was a monthly publication aimed at architects and interior designers. The booklet was published by Amsterdam publisher Hooge Brug (1918–1923) and by the Santpoort publisher C.A. Mees (1924–1931). It was a mouthpiece for the architect association Architectura et Amicitia. (Architecture and Friendship). The chief editor was the architect Hendricus Theodorus Wijdeveld. Wendingen initially was an important platform for Dutch expressionism, also known as the Amsterdam School, and later endorsed the New Objectivity.

In spite of the link of Wendingen with an architect's association, the contents of the booklet were not limited to architecture but attention was also given to art and design. The magazine gained recognition not only through its content but also by its remarkable square format and the striking typography of architect Hendrik Wijdeveld, El Lissitzky, Vilmos Huszar and others.

In Modern architecture of the 1920s are three notable movements: Cubist, Expressionist and Constructivist architecture. The magazine Wendingen (first issue January 1918) was influential on international Expressionist architecture. The other Dutch magazine De Stijl (first issue October 1917) was influential on the International Style.

== Book cover illustrations 1918–1931 ==
Series 1	No	Publ. date	Theme	Cover design	Cover
1918	1	Jan. 1918	Architecture / Applied art	Mathieu Lauweriks	
1918	2	Feb. 1918	Architecture / Sculpture	Michel de Klerk	
1918	3	Mar. 1918	Architecture / Sculpture	Hildo Krop	
1918	4	Apr. 1918	Architecture / Applied art	Cornelis Blaauw	
1918	5	May 1918	Architecture	Richard Roland Holst	
1918	6	Jun. 1918	Architecture / Sculpture	H.A. van Anrooy	
1918	7	Jul. 1918	Amsterdam School	E.J. Kuipers	
1918	8	Aug. 1918	Park Meerwijk in Bergen	C.A. Lion Cachet	
1918	9	Sep. 1918	Sculpture	Jan Sluijters	
1918	10	Oct. 1918	Architecture	Samuel Jessurun de Mesquita	
1918	11-12	Dec. 1918	Jan Toorop	Willem van Konijnenburg	
Series 2	No	Publ. date	Theme	Cover design	Cover
1919	1	Jan. 1919	Eastern art	Karel de Bazel	
1919	2	Feb. 1919	Our time & Michel de Klerk	Tom Poggenbeek	
1919	3	Mar. 1919	Dancing	Jan Sluijters	
1919	4	May 1919	Architecture	Pauline Bolken	
1919	5	May. 1919	Art & advertisement	Jan Bertus Heukelom	
1919	6	Sep. 1919	Interiors	Jan Luger	
1919	7-8	Nov. 1919	Woodcuts	Richard Roland Holst	
1919	9-10	Nov. 1919	Theatre	Jan Toorop	
1919	11	Jan. 1920	Architecture	Hildo Krop	
1919	12	Feb. 1920	Architecture	Guillaume la Croix	
Series 3	No	Publ. date	Theme	Cover design	Cover
1920	1	Mar. 1920	Sculpture	Bernard Essers	
1920	2	Apr. 1920	The works of Gustav Klimt	Tjerk Bottema	
1920	3-4	May 1920	Public housing	Michel de Klerk	
1920	5	Jul. 1920	Art from Hungary	Jozef Cantré	
1920	6-7	Sep. 1920	Masks	Richard Roland Holst	
1920	8-9	Nov. 1920	Josef Hoffmann	Hendrik van den Eijnde	
1920	10	Jan. 1921	The works of Erich Mendelsohn	Hendrik Wijdeveld	
1920	11-12	Feb. 1921	Architecture of the Gemeentemuseum; Den Haag by H.P. Berlage	Jacob Jongert	
Series 4	No	Publ. date	Theme	Cover design	Cover
1921	1-2	May 1921	The works of Willem van Konijnenburg	Hendrik Wijdeveld	
1921	3	Sep. 1921	East Asian art from the Pertrucci Collection in Amsterdam	Michel de Klerk	
1921	4-5	Dec. 1921	Works from members of Architectura et Amicitiae	Richard Roland Holst	
1921	6	Feb. 1922	Drawings and photographs of a house in Oostvoorne	Jaap Gidding	
1921	7-8	May 1922	The marionet	C.A. Lion Cachet	
1921	9-10	Jul. 1922	International exhibition on theatre 1922 Amsterdam	Frits Lensvelt	
1921	11	Oct. 1922	Frank Lloyd Wright	El Lissitzky	
1921	12	Nov. 1922	New building of the Academy of Arts in Amsterdam	Jan Duiker & Bernard Bijvoet	
1922	no series of this year				
Series 5	No	Publ. date	Theme	Cover design	Cover
1923	1	Jan. 1923	Stained glass windows of R.N. Roland Holst	Jacob Jongert	
1923	2	Mar. 1923	Advertisements by Dutch artists	Jan Sluijters	
1923	3	Apr. 1923	Skyskrapers in Europe and America	Johan Polet	
1923	4	May 1923	Houses in Amsterdam-Zuid	Albert Klijn	
1923	5-6	Jul. 1923	Sculptures by Dutch artists	Joseph Mendes da Costa	
1923	7	Sep. 1923	Public housing in Amsterdam	Anton Kurvers	
1923	8-9	Nov. 1923	Seashells	Richard Roland Holst	
1923	10	Feb. 1924	Bookplates by Dutch artists	Bernard Essers	
1923	11-12	Mar. 1924	Projects of the architects C.J. Blaauw, J. Crouwel en J.M. Luthmann	Samuel Jessurun de Mesquita	
Series 6	No	Publ. date	Theme	Cover design	Cover
1924	1	Apr. 1924	Sculptures of 6 Dutch artists	Jan Havermans	
1924	2	May 1924	Sketches and studies by Michel de Klerk	Louise Beijerman	
1924	3	Jul. 1924	Works by Hermann Finsterlin	Hermann Finsterlin	
1924	4-5	Aug. 1924	Architectural project by M. de Klerk	Margaret Staal-Kropholler	
1924	6	Sep. 1924	Eileen Gray	Hendrik Wijdeveld	
1924	7	Oct. 1924	Portraits by Michel de Klerk	Tine Baanders	
1924	8	Jan. 1925	Hilversum Town Hall and other works by W.M. Dudok	Willem Dudok	
1924	9-10	Feb. 1925	Buildings by M. de Klerk	Tine Baanders	
1924	11-12	Apr. 1925	Crystals	Bernard Essers	
Series 7	No	Publ. date	Theme	Cover design	Cover
1925	1	May 1925	De Mesquita	Samuel Jessurun de Mesquita	
1925	2	Jul. 1925	Sculptures by Hildo Krop	Hildo Krop	
1925	3	Oct. 1925	The life-work of the American architect Frank Lloyd Wright	Hendrik Wijdeveld	
1925	4	Nov. 1925	Frank Lloyd Wright	Hendrik Wijdeveld	
1925	5	Jan. 1926	Frank Lloyd Wright	Hendrik Wijdeveld	
1925	6	Feb. 1926	Frank Lloyd Wright	Hendrik Wijdeveld	
1925	7	Mar. 1926	Frank Lloyd Wright	Hendrik Wijdeveld	
1925	8	Mar. 1926	Frank Lloyd Wright	Hendrik Wijdeveld	
1925	9	Apr. 1926	Frank Lloyd Wright	Hendrik Wijdeveld	
1925	10	May 1926	Furniture - M. de Klerk	Fokko Mees	
1925	11-12	Sep. 1926	P. Kramer's Bijenkorf	Julius Luthmann	
1926	no series of this year				
Series 8	No	Publ. date	Theme	Cover design	Cover
1927	1	Jun. 1927	Sculpture	Johan Polet	
1927	2	Jul. 1927	Interiors	Otto B. de Kat	
1927	3	Sep. 1927	Flemish theatre - Johan de Meester	Anton Kurvers	
1927	4	Oct. 1927	Denmark	Samuel Jessurun de Mesquita	
1927	5	Nov. 1927	Sweden	Samuel Jessurun de Mesquita	
1927	6-7	Jan. 1928	Amsterdam West	Jan Snellebrand	
1927	8	Feb. 1928	Sweden II	Samuel Jessurun de Mesquita	
1927	9-10	Mar. 1928	Austria	Christa Ehrlich	
1927	11	Apr. 1928	Public housing in Amsterdam	P.L. Marnette	
1927	12	May 1928	Graphic arts	Tine Baanders	
Series 9	No	Publ. date	Theme	Cover design	Cover
1928	1	Jul. 1928	Architect Willem Dudok	Hendrik Wouda	
1928	2	Aug. 1928	Technology and art	W. H. Gispen	
1928	3-4	Sep. 1928	Works by Jan Toorop in private collections	Richard Roland Holst	
1928	5	Oct. 1928	Hindu sculptures from Java	Johan ten Klooster	
1928	6-7	Nov. 1928	Sculpture	Nicolaas van de Vecht	
1928	8	Dec. 1928	Cartoons by Albert Hahn	Albert Hahn jr.	
1928	9	Jan. 1929	Works by Johan Thorn Prikker	Hildo Krop	
1928	10	Mar. 1929	Graphic arts	Samuel Jessurun de Mesquita	
1928	11	Apr. 1929	Puppets and marionettes	Anton Kurvers	
1928	12	May 1929	Russian icons	K. Katkof	
Series 10	No	Publ. date	Theme	Cover design	Cover
1929	1	Jul. 1929	Sculptures by Ossip Zadkine	Hildo Krop	
1929	2	Sep. 1929	Glass works by Lebeau	Chris Lebeau	
1929	3	Oct. 1929	Paintings by Diego Rivera	Vilmos Huszar	
1929	4	Dec. 1929	St. Nicolas Church in IJsselstein	Joop Sjollema	
1929	5-6	Jan. 1930	Architect J.F. Staal	Margaret Kropholler	
1929	7	Feb. 1930	Paintings by Lyonel Feininger	Tine Baanders	
1929	8	Apr. 1930	Architect J.L.M. Lauweriks	Mathieu Lauweriks	
1929	9	Jun. 1930	Ancient Italian art	Jan Poortenaar	
1929	10	Jul. 1930	Russian theatre	Samuel Jessurun de Mesquita	
1929	11-12	Oct. 1930	Architecture in Amsterdam Zuid	Henry Tino Zwiers	
Series 11	No	Publ. date	Theme	Cover design	Cover
1930	1	Nov. 1930	Rothenburg ob der Tauber	A.C. (=A.P.) Smits	
1930	2	Dec. 1930	Factory of De Erven Wed. J. van Nelle in Rotterdam	Leendert van der Vlugt	
1930	3	Jan. 1931	Dutch pavilion in Antwerp 1930	Willem Jacob Rozendaal	
1930	4	Mar. 1931	Bourdelle	Jouke Zietsma	
1930	5	Apr. 1931	Aerial photography of the Netherlands	Arthur Staal	
1930	6-7	Jun. 1931	Glass paintings and heads by Richard Roland Holst	Joop Sjollema	
1930	8	Jul. 1931	De Bijenkorf in Rotterdam, by Willem Dudok	Arthur Staal	
1930	9	Aug. 1931	Infographics	Peter Alma	
1930	10	Oct. 1931	Glass factory "Leerdam"	Andries Copier	
1930	11-12	Nov. 1931	Hilversum Town Hall	Willem Dudok	
Series 12	No	Publ. date	Theme	Cover design	Cover
1931	1	Jan. 1932	Sculptures by Samuel Jessurun de Mesquita	Samuel Jessurun de Mesquita	
1931	2	Feb. 1932	Dutch poster art	S.L. Schwarz	
1931	3	Mar. 1932	Joep Nicolas - glass artist	Joep Nicolas	
1931	4	Apr. 1932	Country houses	Henry Zwiers	
1931	5	May 1932	Sculptures by Hildo Krop	Hildo Krop	
1931	6	Jul. 1932	Paintings by Pyke Koch, Kor Postma and Carel Willink	Arthur Staal	
1931	7-8	Sep. 1932	Schools	Henry Zwiers	
1931	9	Oct. 1932	Statues	Theo van Reijn	
1931	10	Dec. 1932	Fahrenkamp	Otto B. de Kat	
1931	11-12	Feb. 1933	Churches	Jouke Zietsma	

== Bibliography ==
M.F. Le Coultre, Wendingen 1918-1932 - Architectuur en vormgeving, Blaricum 2001. Dutch edition, 272 pages with articles and all 116 covers.

M.F. Le Coultre, Wendingen: a journal for the arts, 1918-1932, New York: Princeton Architectural Press, 2001. English edition, 272 pages with articles and all 116 covers.
