= Hendrik Wouda =

Dutch architect and furniture designer

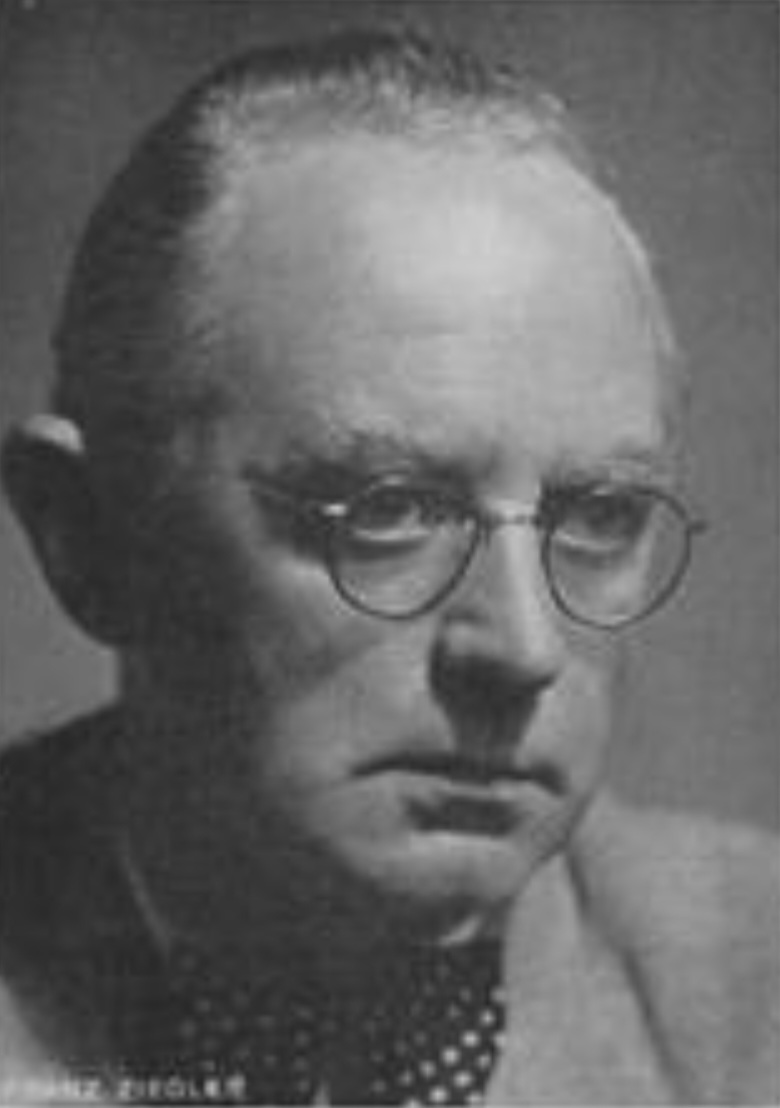
- H. Wouda
- Born: 10 May 1885; Leeuwarden, Netherlands
- Died: 25 October 1946 (aged 61); Wassenaar, Netherlands
- Occupations: Architect, Furniture Designer

Hendrik Wouda (10 May 1885 in Leeuwarden – 25 October 1946 in Wassenaar) was a Dutch architect and furniture designer. He designed furniture, lighting and interiors for homes, offices, ships and exhibitions. His work is characterized by a strongly marked simplicity, a cubic joining together of volumes, well-balanced spatial effects and a practical division of the floor-plan. He also practiced independently as an architect.

In his designs, such as that for the Villa De Luifel (1924) in Wassenaar and the Villa Kessler or Slingerduin (1929) in Velsen, Wouda showed himself to be influenced by Frank Lloyd Wright. The interior of the Villa Kessler reflects a monumental, subdued atmosphere in its use of color.

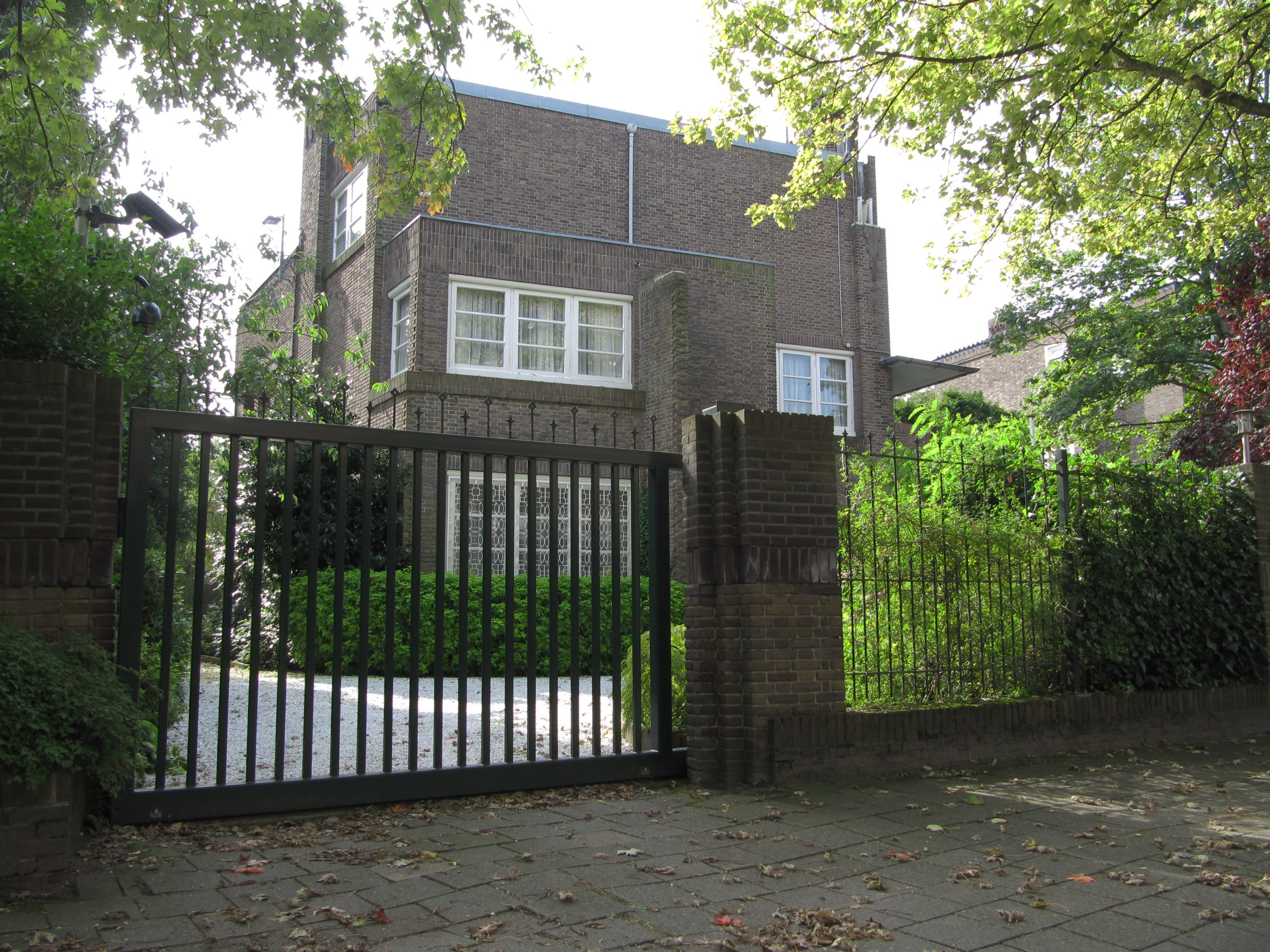
Gogelweg 20, The Hague

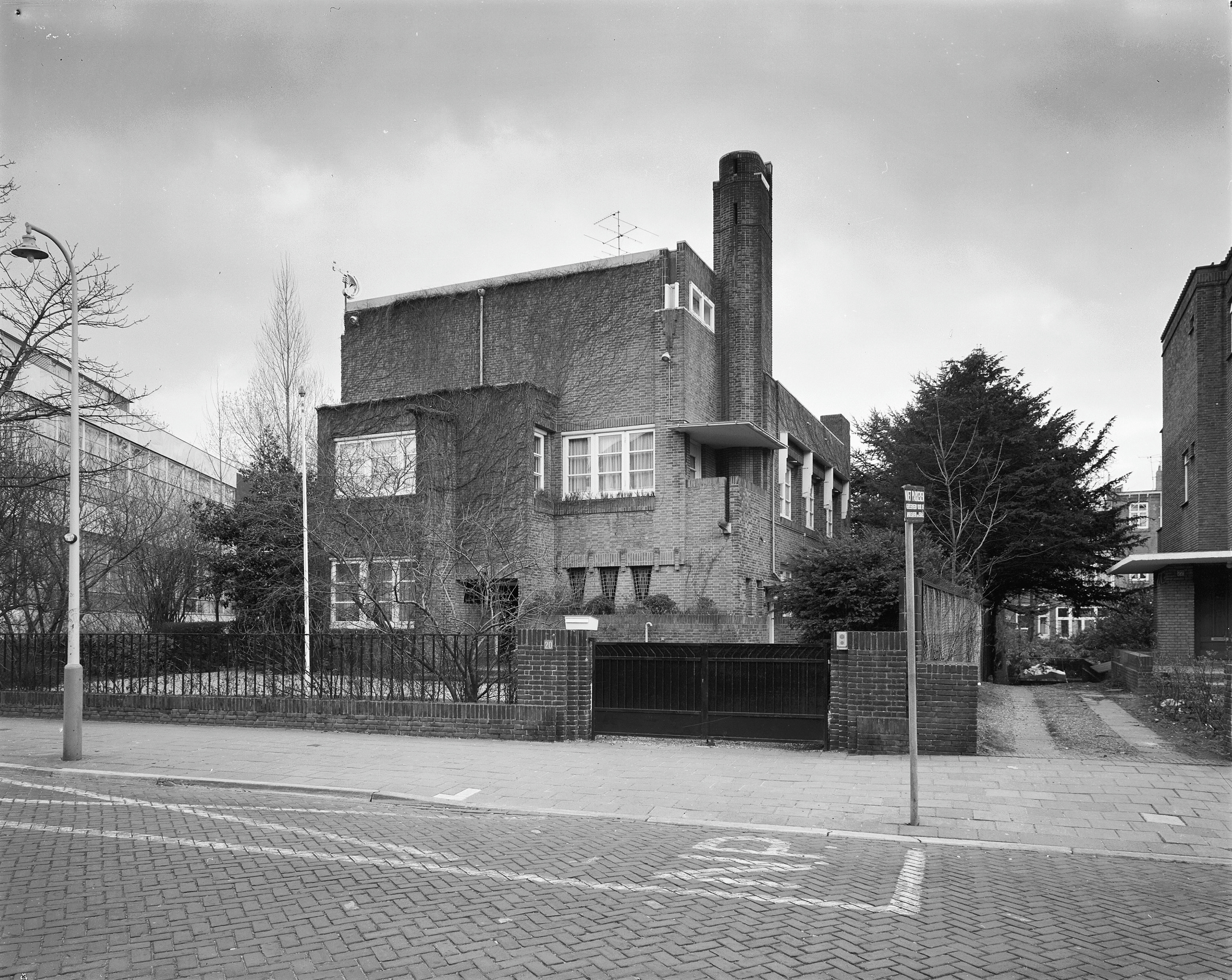
Gogelweg 20, The Hague

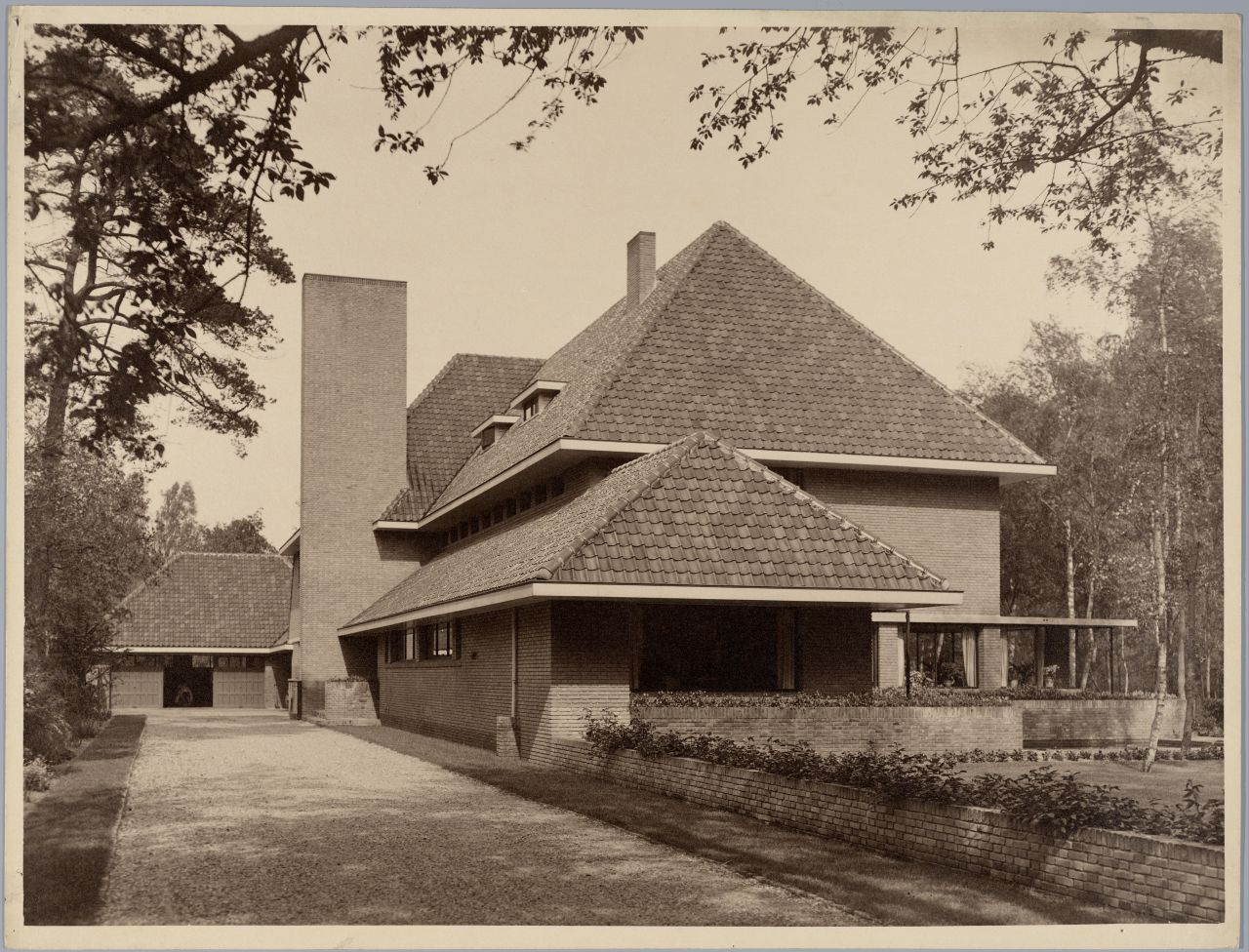
Villa De Luifel, Wassenaar

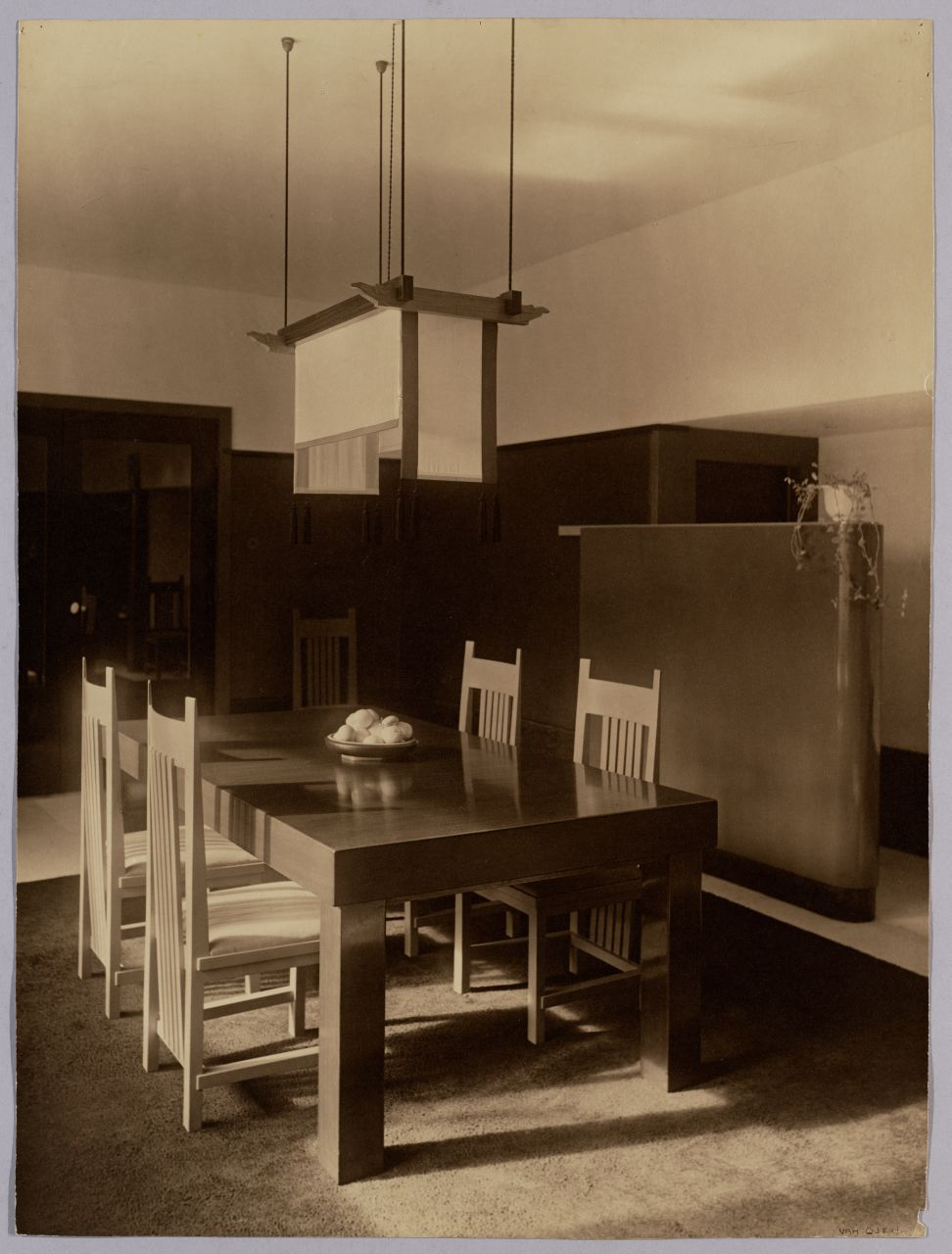
Villa De Luifel, Wassenaar

After being educated in Rotterdam and The Hague and briefly working in Amsterdam, Wouda went on tour in Germany and Austria in 1912. In Munich, he was influenced by Eduard Pfeiffer, before returning to the Netherlands when World War I broke out.

In 1916, Wouda established himself as an architect in The Hague and one year later he was employed at the furniture firm of H. Pander & Zonen. He received the freedom to develop his own monumental style, clearly inspired by Wright but also influenced by his sojourn in Germany. In 1918-1919 he worked with Jan Wils (Alkmaar). His first well-known commission was for the interiors of the Villa Sevensteyn (1920–21) built by W.M. Dudok in Zorgvliet Park, The Hague. The graphic geometric character that characterizes his entire oeuvre is demonstrated strongly in his typographic design, such as the lettering of his own villa “The Appelhof” in Wassenaar (1930).

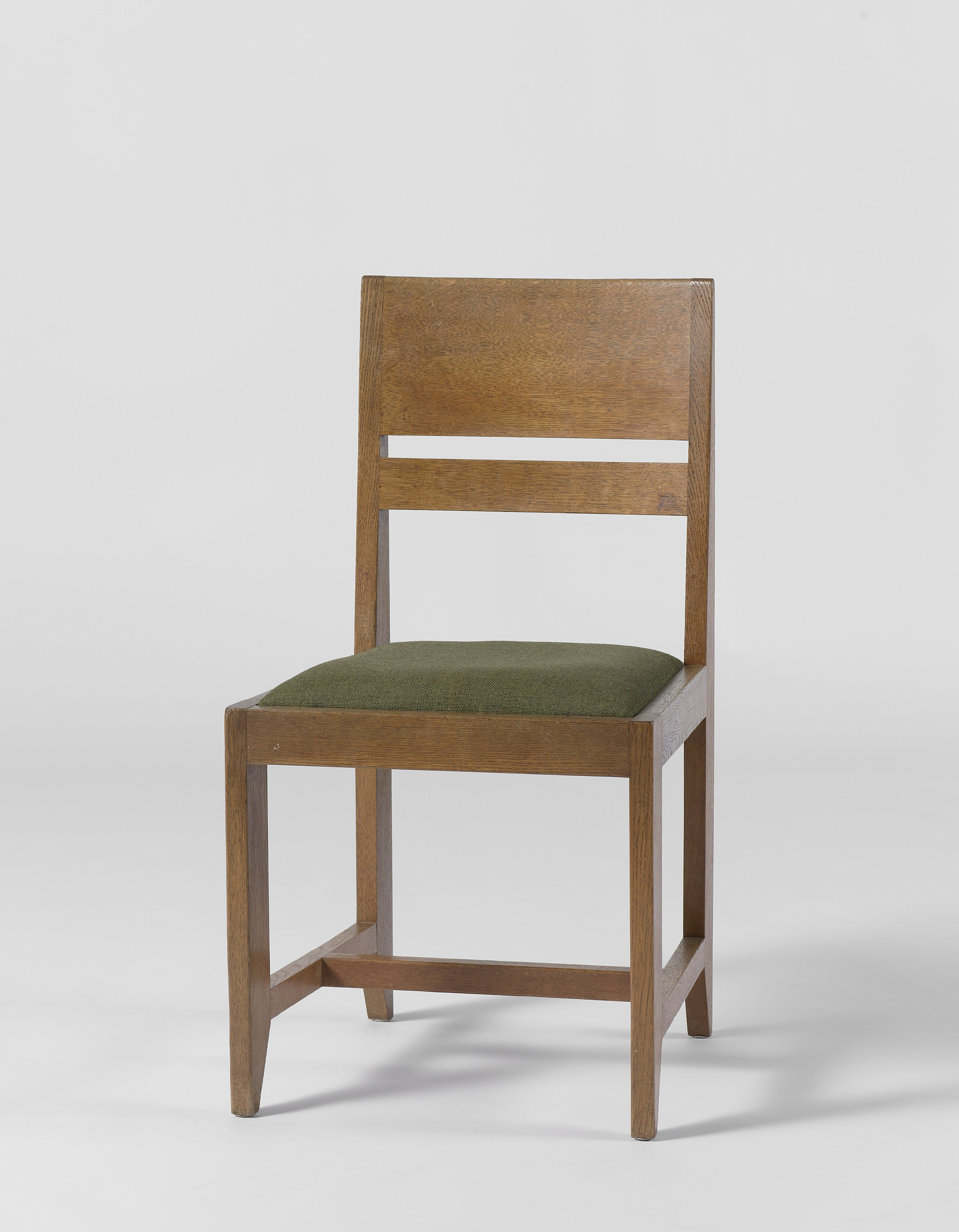
Chair
(Pander & Son, 1924)

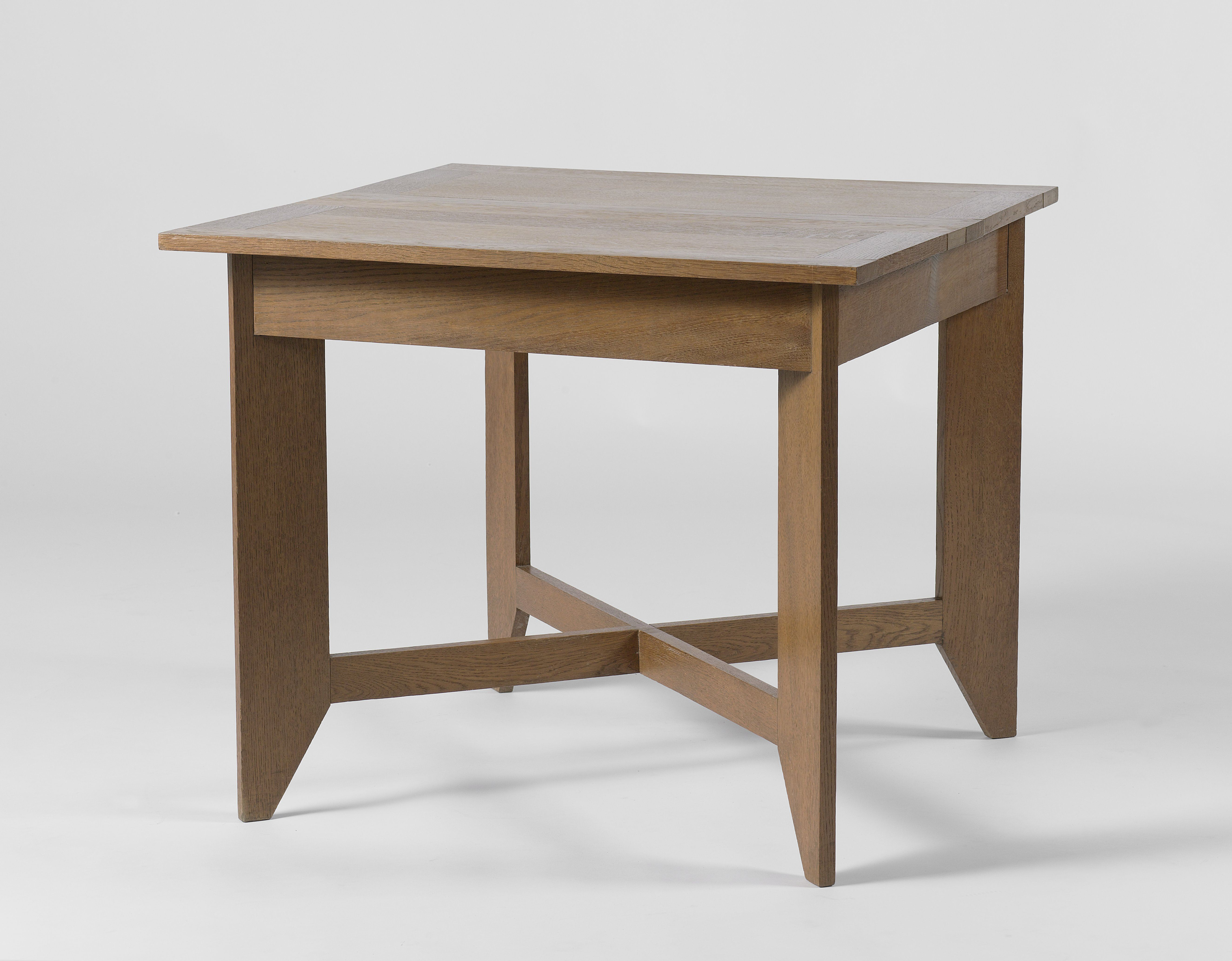
Table (1924)

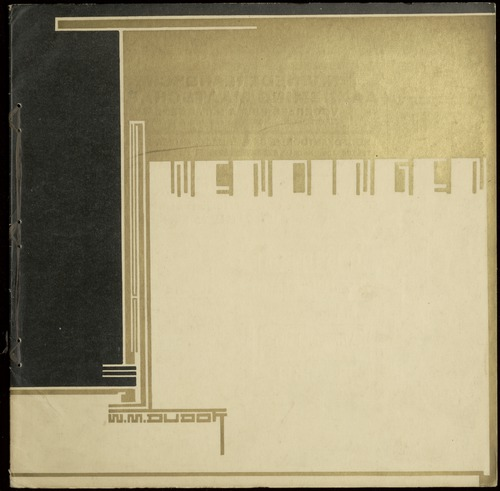
Cover for magazine Wendingen 1928

== Sources ==
- Teunissen, Monique; Albert Veldhuisen (1989). Hendrik Wouda: Architect and Furniture Designer (1885-1946) [Original Dutch title: Hendrik Wouda: Architect en meubelontwerper (1885-1946)]. Uitgeverij. ISBN 90-6450-077-0.
- Krabbendam, Hans (2009). Four Centuries of Dutch-American Relations: 1609-2009. State University of New York Press. ISBN 978-1-4384-3013-3.
