= Hendrik Wijdeveld =

Dutch architect and graphic designer (1885–1987)

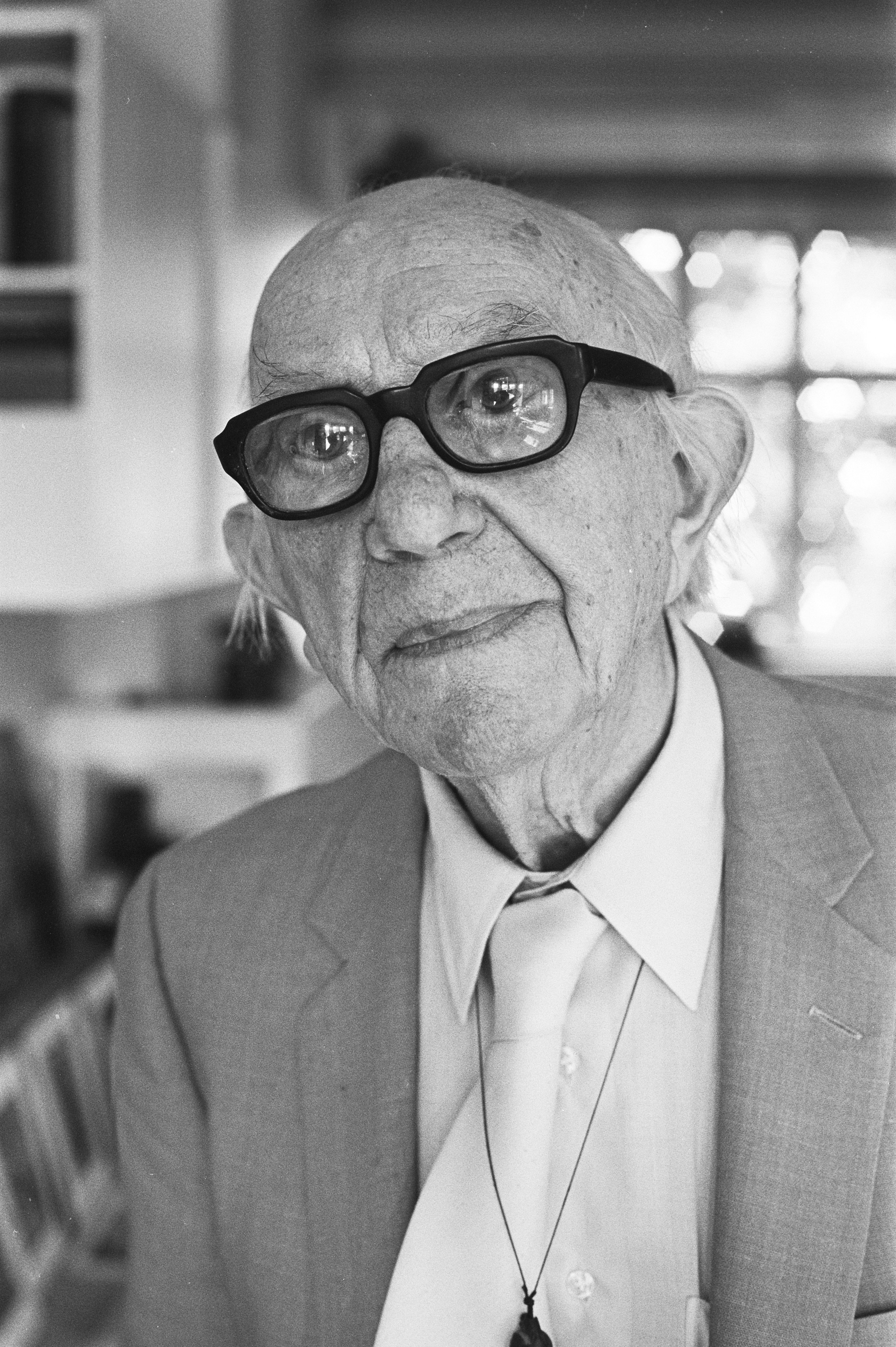
- Wijdeveld in 1980
- Born: 4 October 1885; The Hague, Netherlands
- Died: 20 February 1987 (aged 101); Nijmegen, Netherlands
- Occupation: Architect

Hendricus Theodorus Wijdeveld (The Hague, 4 October 1885 – Nijmegen, 20 February 1987) was a Dutch architect and graphic designer. He was an important figure of the Amsterdam School and is known for his work as editor-in-chief for the Wendingen magazine.

== Life and work ==
Wijdeveld started his career at the architectural firm of Jacques van Straaten and the studio of Pierre Cuypers. He then worked in France as an assistant to the architect Louis Cordonnier. He returned to Amsterdam in 1914. From 1914 to 1940, he completed his main designs:

- 1920–1921: Bendien Residence
- 1922–1927: Villa De Wachter
- 1927: Plan West Amsterdam
- 1928: Villa de Bouw
- 1936: Tilburg villa

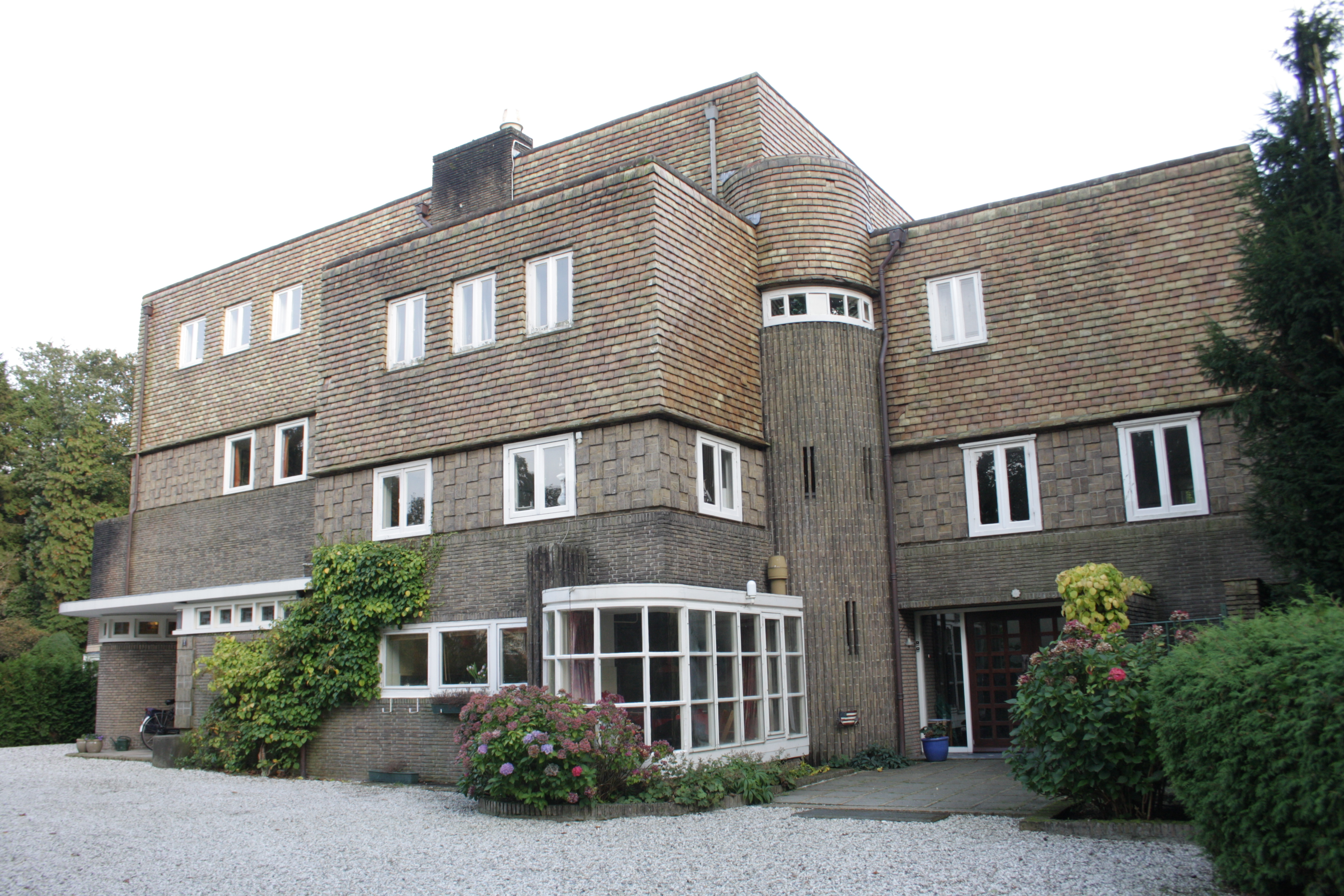
Villa de Wachter

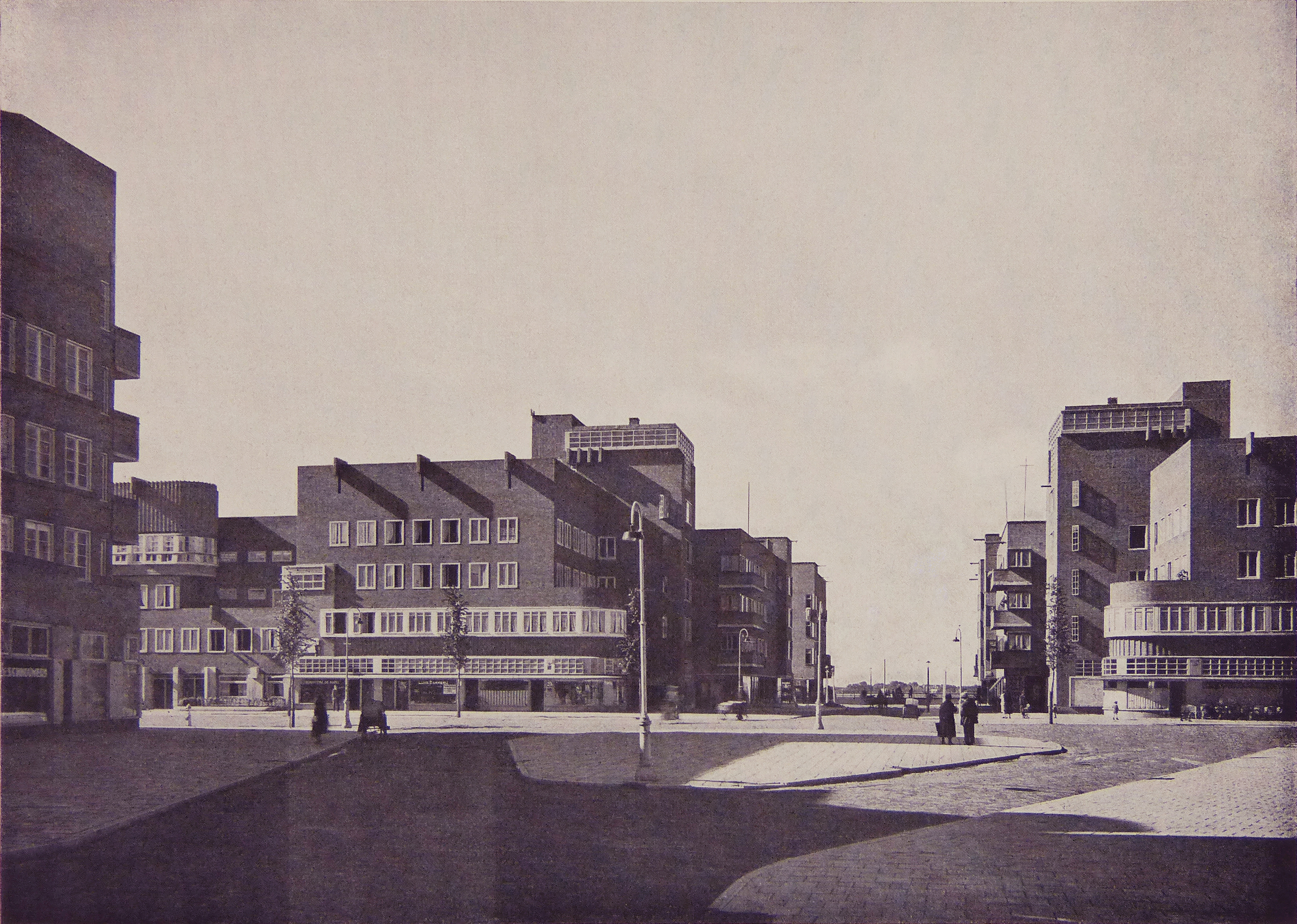
Plan West Amsterdam 1922–1927. Hoofdweg / Jan van Galenstraat. Urban ensemble and architecture by H.Th. Wijdeveld (1885–1987).

He is also known for his futuristic projects:

- 1918: A vagina-shaped building for the Volkstheater ("People's Theater")
- A reforestation project for Amsterdam
- The 'Plan the impossible' project

=== Editor for Wendingen ===
From 1918 to 1932, Wijdeveld was the editor-in-chief of the magazine Wendingen, a publication for the architecture association Architectura et Amicitia. The magazine was known for its groundbreaking architectural approach to typography. It also was an important platform for several modernist movements in the Netherlands.

=== War period ===
Wijdeveld published a book titled De Nieuwe Orde ("The New Order") in 1940, suggesting his sympathy for the German occupation. As a result, he fell out of public favor, but appears to have been rehabilitated after the war since the Stedelijk Museum, a major national museum in Amsterdam, dedicated a major retrospective to him in 1953.

=== Teaching ===
Wijdeveld taught in America between 1947 and 1952 at the invitation of Frank Lloyd Wright. In 1949–1950, he was a visiting professor at NC State College's School of Design.

=== Family ===
Wijdeveld was married to the cellist Ellen Philippine Kohn, then to the actress Charlotte Köhler. He has one daughter, illustrator Ruscha Wijdeveld, and two sons, Wolfgang Wijdeveld and Roland Matthijs Wijdeveld.

== See also ==
List of Dutch architects

== Publications about Wijdeveld ==
- Jean-Paul Baeten & Aaron Betsky: Design the impossible. The world of architect Hendrik Wijdeveld (1885–1987). Rotterdam, NAI Publishers, 2006. ISBN 9056624970
- H.Th. Wijdeveld, 50 years of creative work. Architecture and urbanism, ideal projects, theatre, sets, costumes, typography, Wendingen, decorative work, publications, books. Inl. by W.M. Dudok. Amsterdam, Stedelijk Museum Amsterdam, 1953
