= Tine Baanders =

Dutch illustrator, typographer, draughtsperson, bookbinder and teacher

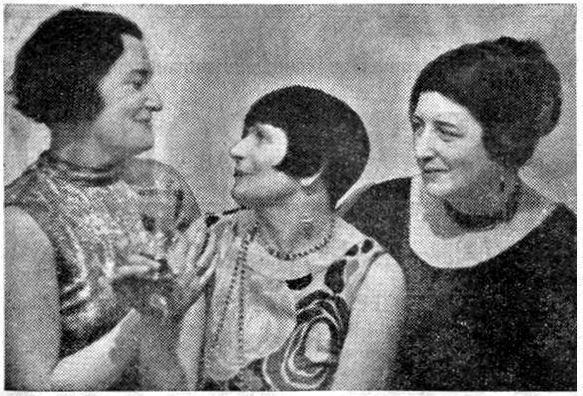
- Tine Baanders (left)
- Born: 4 August 1890; Amsterdam
- Died: 24 November 1971 (aged 81); Maarssen

Martina “Tine” Baanders (1890 – 1971) was a Dutch illustrator, graphic designer, typographer, lithographer, teacher and made items out of leather. She is known for ex-libris designs and protective book covers.

== Life and career ==
She studied at the Instituut voor Kunstnijverheidsonderwijs in Amsterdam. In 1919 she became a teacher in design and calligraphy at the book binding department of the Dagteeken- en Kunstambachtsschool voor Meisjes in Amsterdam. She was a frequent contributor to the art magazine Wendingen. She exhibited her work in Amsterdam (1913, 1917), Rotterdam (1918), Haarlem (1919) and Paris (1925). At the Exposition Internationale des Arts Décoratifs et Industriels Modernes (1925 world's fair) in Paris, she was awarded a Diplôme de Médaille de Bronze. Besides teaching in Amsterdam, she also taught calligraphy during the years 1949-1953 at the Academie voor Kunst en Industrie (AKI) in Enschede.
