= Samuel Jessurun de Mesquita =

Dutch graphic artist (1868–1944)

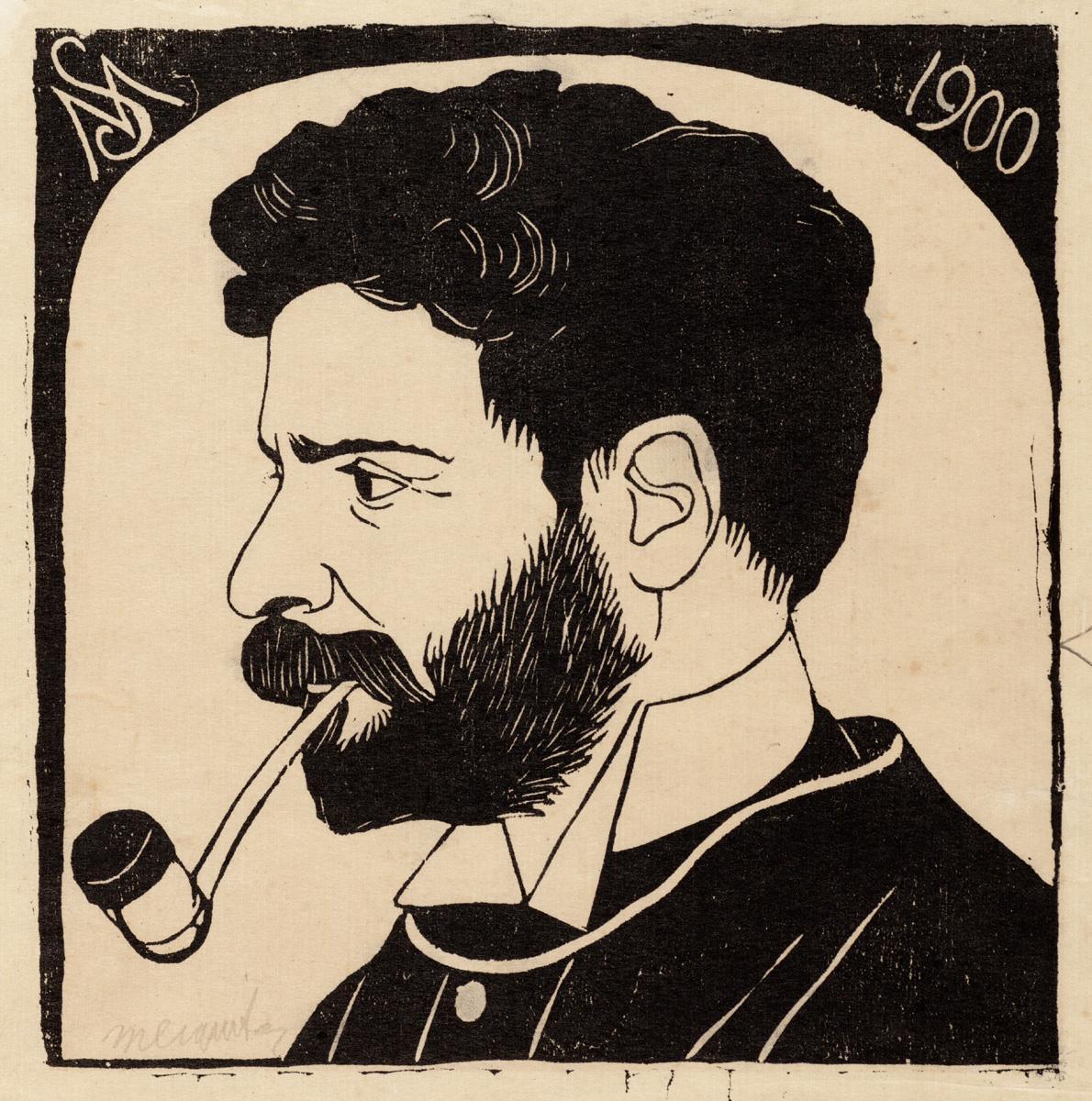
- Self-portrait, 1900
- Born: 6 June 1868; Amsterdam, Netherlands
- Died: c. 11 February 1944 (aged 75); Auschwitz-Birkenau, German-occupied Poland

Samuel Jessurun de Mesquita (6 June 1868 – c. 11 February 1944) was a Dutch graphic artist active in the years before the Second World War. His pupils included graphic artist M. C. Escher (1898–1972). A Sephardic Jew, in his old age he was sent to Auschwitz by the Nazis, where he was gassed along with his wife.

== Early life and education ==
Samuel Jessurun de Mesquita was born on 6 June 1868 into a Jewish family living in Amsterdam. Though a member of a tightly knit Sephardic community, a minority among Dutch Jews, de Mesquita, like most of his contemporaries, was not religiously observant. His father, a secondary school teacher of Hebrew and German, died when Sam or Sampie, as he was called, was five.

At the age of fourteen, the young de Mesquita applied to the Rijksakademie in pursuit of his artistic interests, only to be rejected. Deeply disappointed, he apprenticed himself to an acting city architect, for whom he worked for two years before entering a technical school with the intention of becoming an architect himself. He soon turned, however, to pedagogy and, in 1889, received a teacher's certificate, which would later enable him to support his family.

== Career, Work, and Influence ==
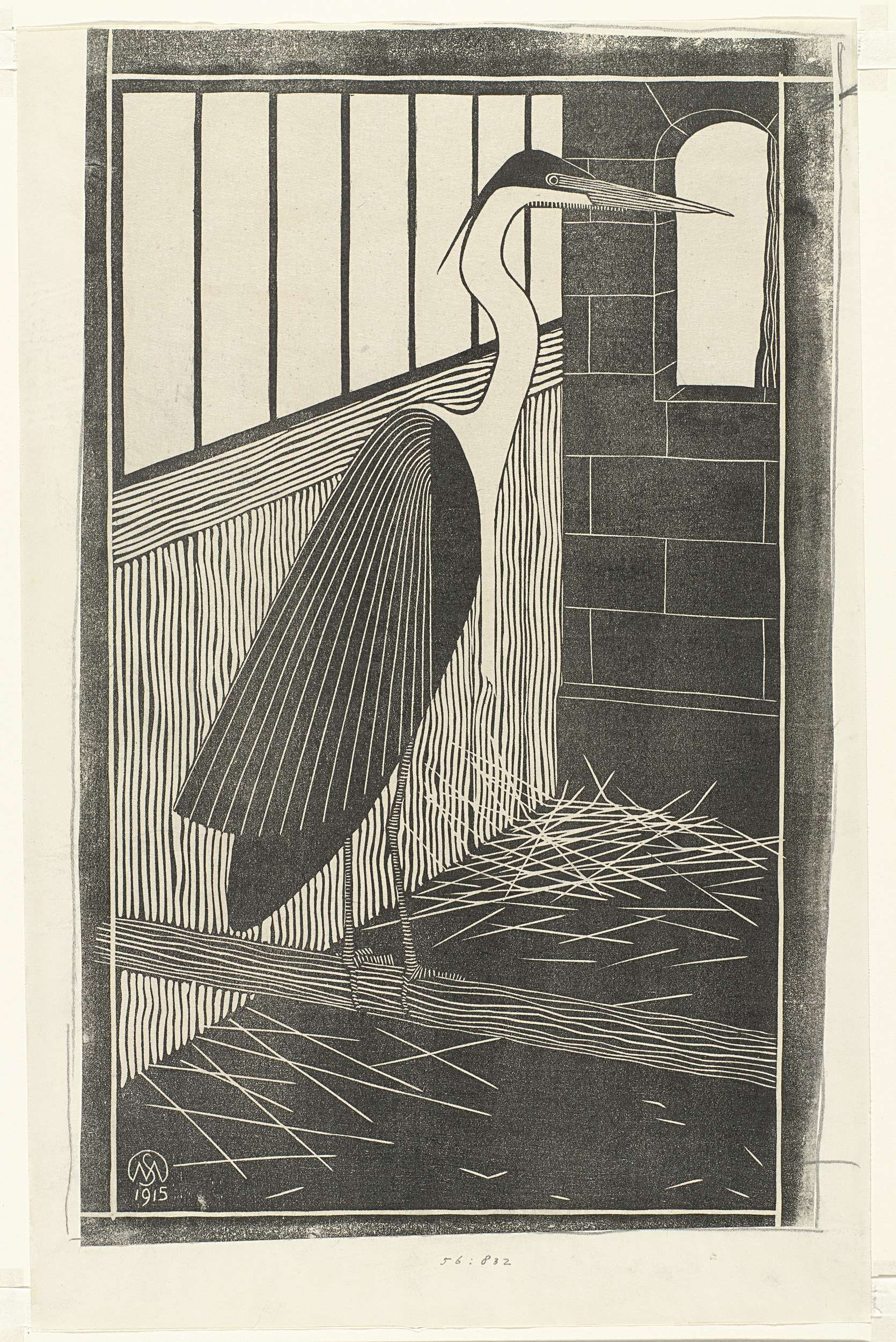
Heron in a cage (1915) by Samuel Jessurun de Mesquita

Over the next years, de Mesquita principally devoted himself to art, experimenting with various techniques and mediums. Though known primarily for his wood engravings, he also produced etchings, lithographs, watercolors and drawings; his applied art consisted mostly of material designs. There are birds, exotic animals, plants and flowers, and fantastical representations, both humorous and grim. Among de Mesquita's most beautiful works are his portraits, particularly his self-portraits.

de Mesquita's work was included in the 1939 exhibition and sale Onze Kunst van Heden (Our Art of Today) at the Rijksmuseum in Amsterdam.

With Nazi Germany's invasion of the Netherlands in May 1940, de Mesquita, already in poor health, was forced to lead a secluded life, limiting his work largely to sketches.

De Mesquita taught nature drawing and graphic arts at The School for Architecture and Decorative Arts, operating out of the Paviljoen Welgelegen in Haarlem. During his time there, M. C. Escher produced a number of wood block prints under various constraints prescribed by De Mesquita. The two developed a lifelong bond which transformed from professor and pupil in nature, to colleagues devoted to the same craft. In a 1946 catalog of a retrospective exhibition of de Mesquita's work, Escher described the artist's work:

His personality was simple, sincere and unaffected, and the woodcut which of all the graphic techniques forces the most restraint, was the medium he was most attached to.... One of the most important factors of his personality in general is that steady self-discipline, that active and alive maintenance of his criticism, that strange intuition that makes him cease his work at the moment the most powerful expression has been attained, so that any additional line would weaken it. Few artists are sensitive and strong enough to be able to tear themselves away from their work and to leave it as it is then... As he grew older and his health faled, the artist let his other work rest more and more, but indefatigably went on with those platful fantasies for which he finally, when he was virtually confied to his chair, used only his sketchbook and his fountain pen."

== Death ==
In the winter of 1944, on either 31 January or 1 February, the occupying German forces entered the home of the de Mesquita family in Watergraafsmeer, now part of Amsterdam, and apprehended him, his wife Elisabeth, and their only son Jaap. Transported to Auschwitz, Samuel Jessurun and Elisabeth were sent to the gas chambers within days of their arrival on 11 February; Jaap perished in the concentration camp at Theresienstadt on 20 March. Escher and some of Jaap's friends were successful in rescuing some of the works that had remained in the de Mesquita home.

== Covers for Wendingen ==
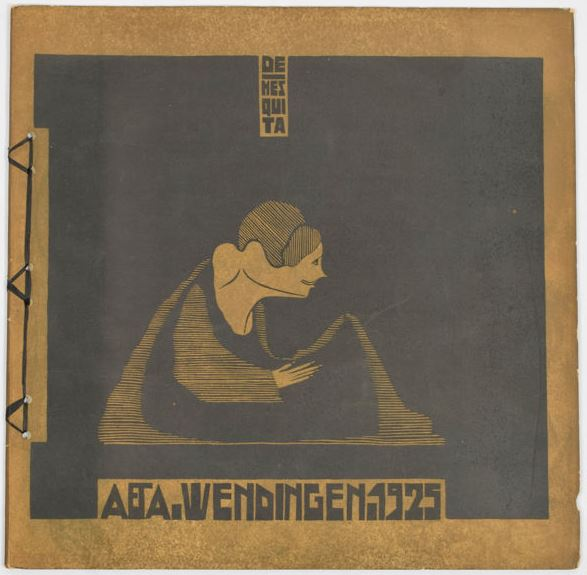
1925

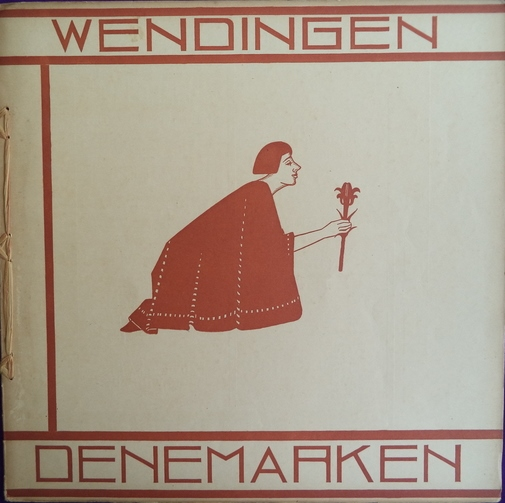
1927

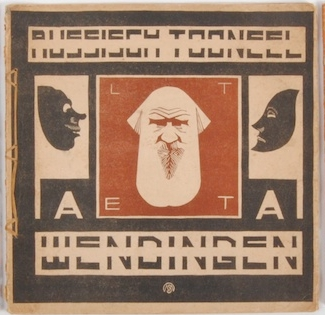
1929

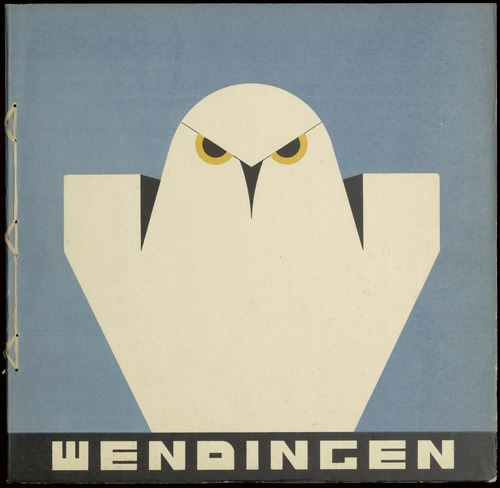
1931
