= Carel Adolph Lion Cachet =

Dutch designer, printmaker and ceramist

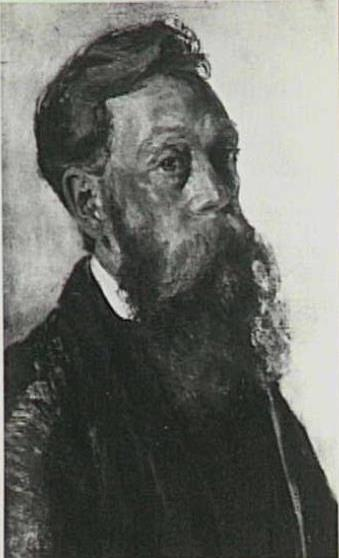
Self portrait, 1905-1910

Carel Adolph Lion Cachet (Amsterdam, 28 November 1864 – Vreeland, 20 May 1945) was a Dutch designer, printmaker and ceramist, known for his role in transforming of Dutch decorative arts in the early 20th century.

== Life and work ==
Born as Carel Adolph Cachet, in 1901 he added "Lion" to his name. From 1880 to 1885 he was educated as teacher for primary school in Amsterdam, and he became an art teacher at various schools in Amsterdam.

Gradually he developed into a decorative art artist. He used batik techniques to design textile, was wood engraver, designed wallpaper, carpets, decorative pottery, furniture, banknotes, posters, was bookbinding designer, and made complete designs for decorating salons in Dutch passenger ships, including for the Netherlands Steamship Company.

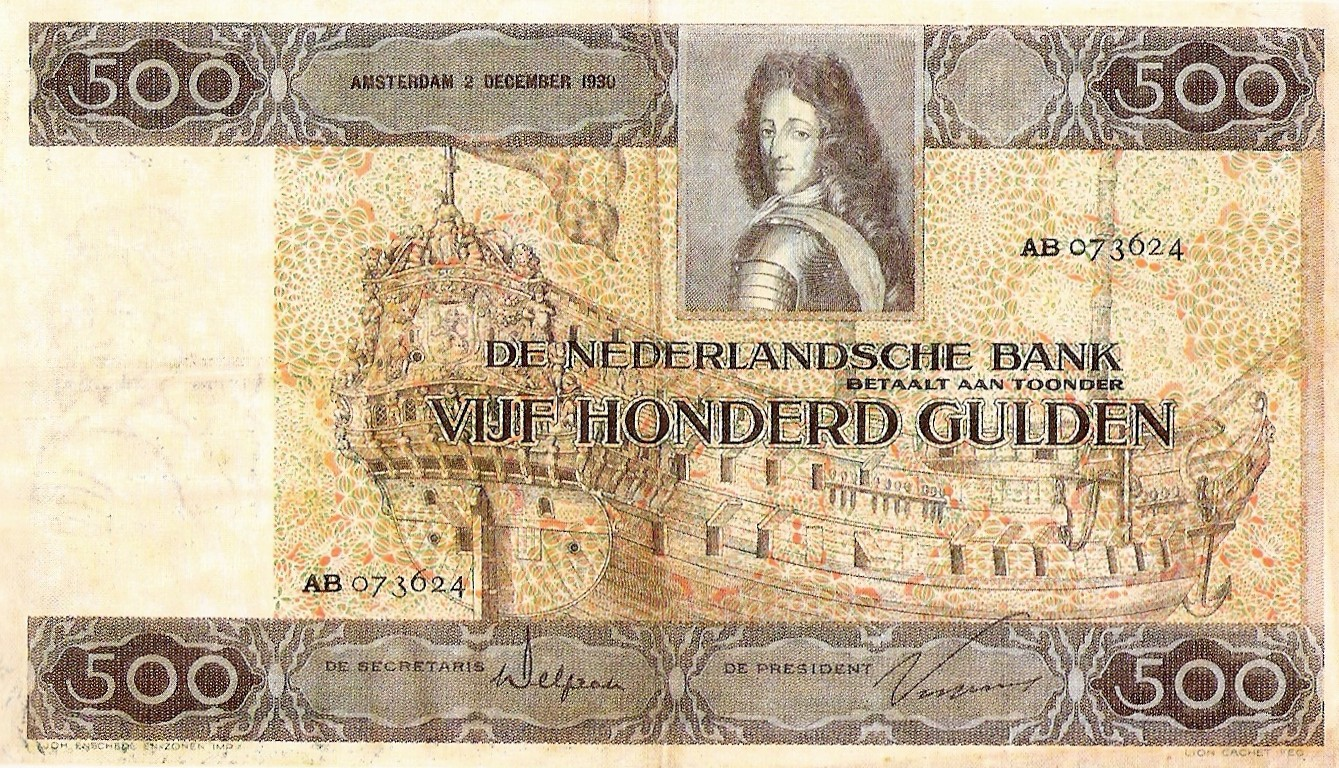
500 Gulden banknote, 1930

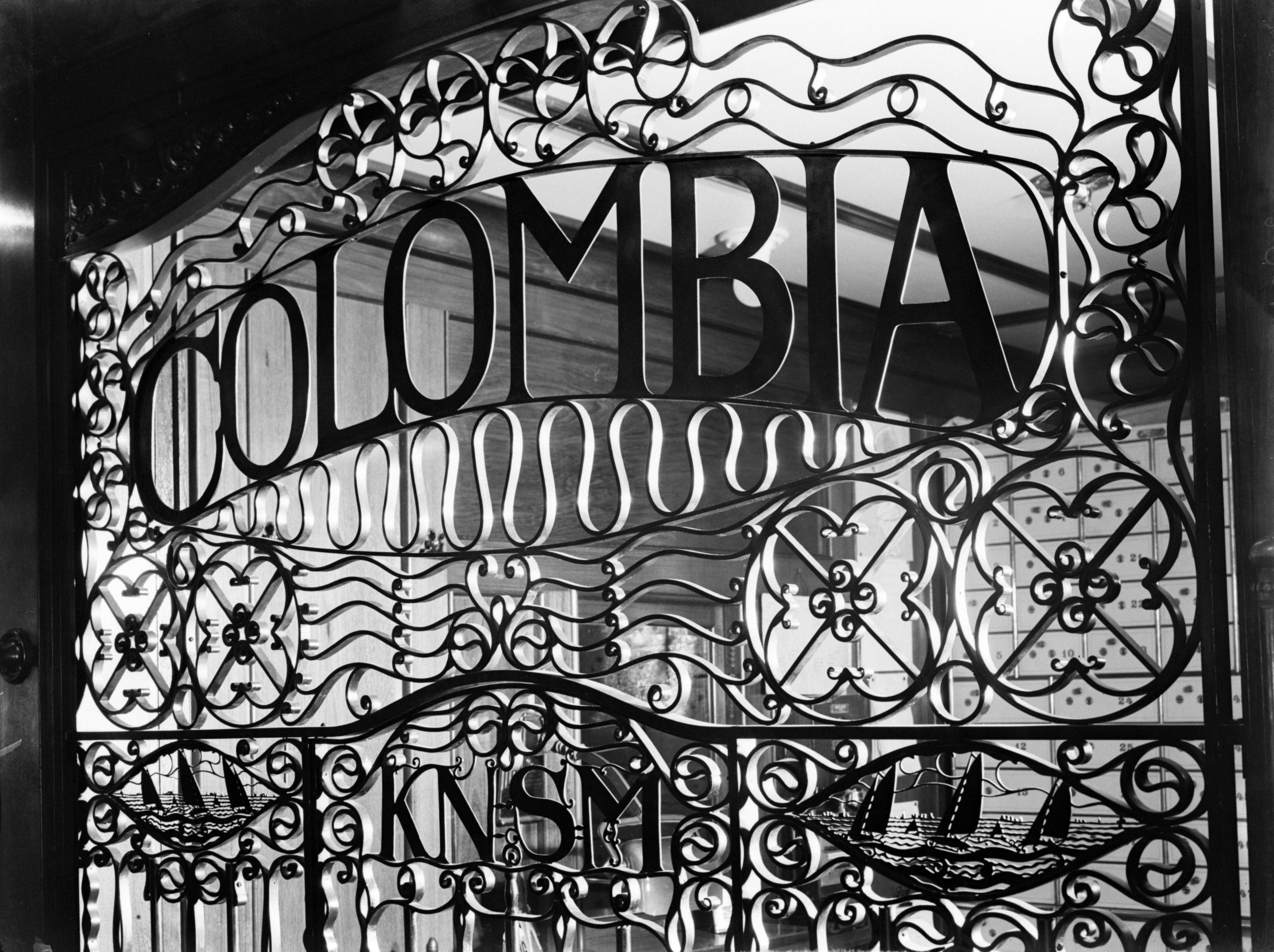
Ship interior
SS Colombia

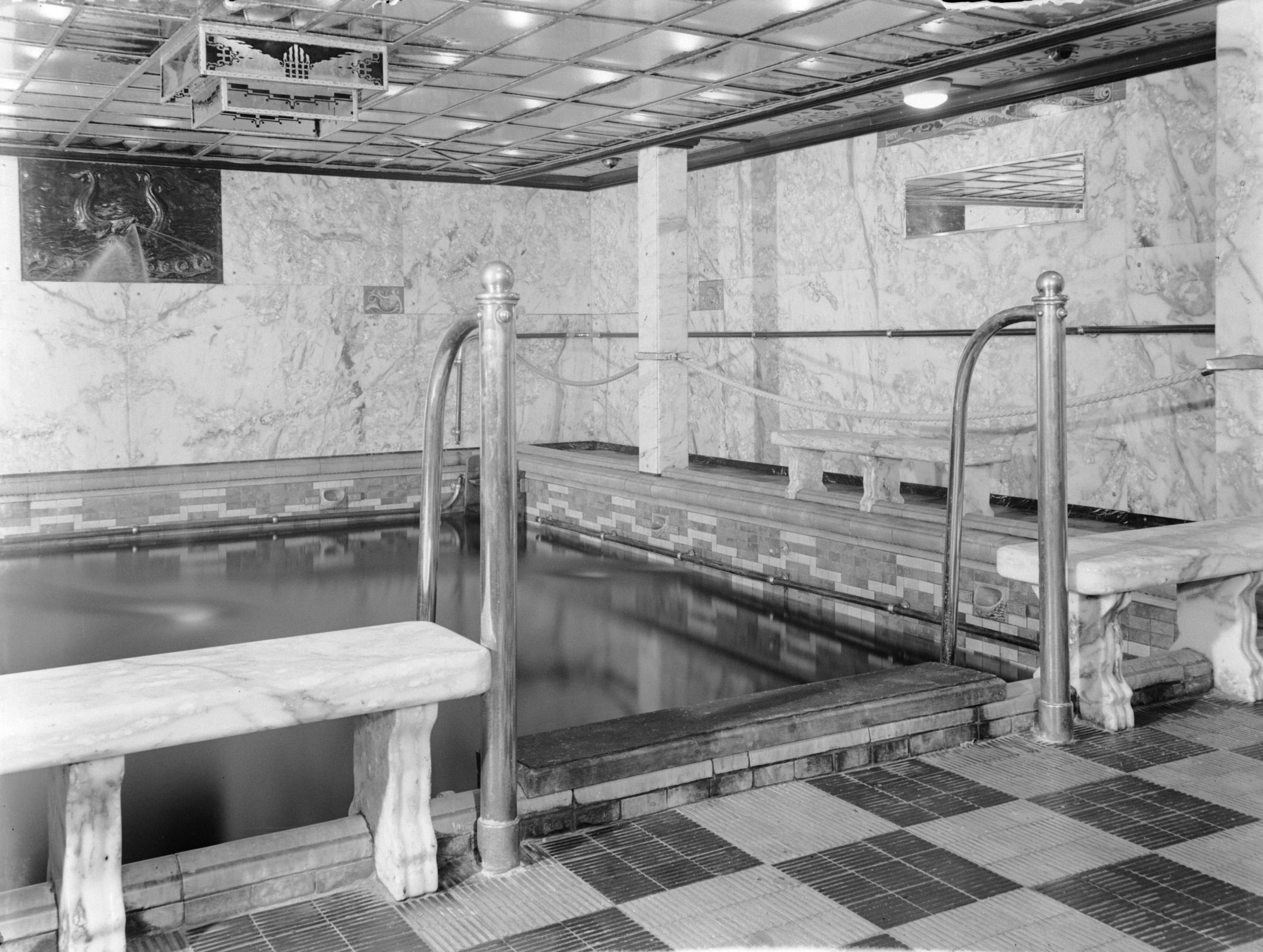
Swimming pool
SS Colombia

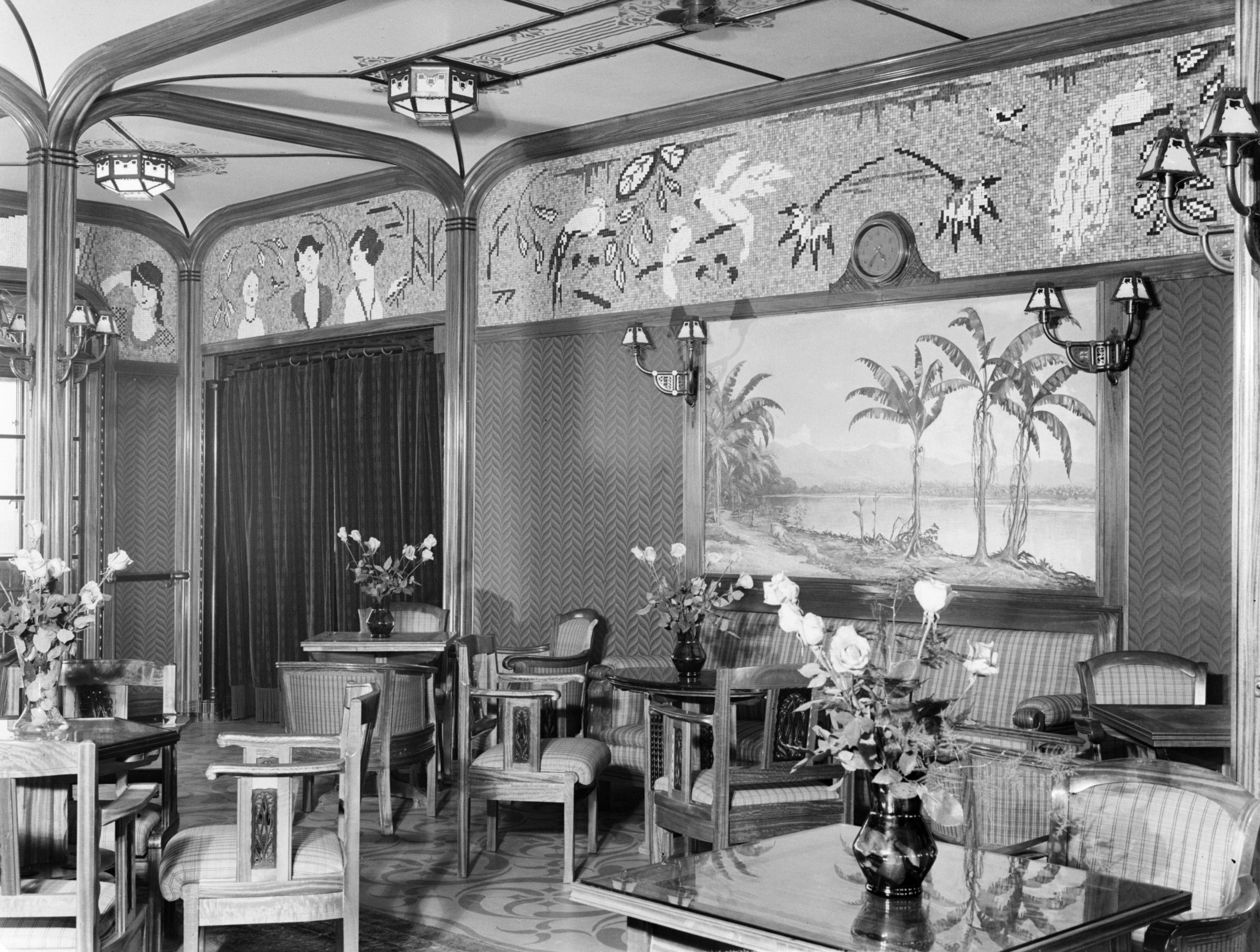
Ship interior
SS Colombia

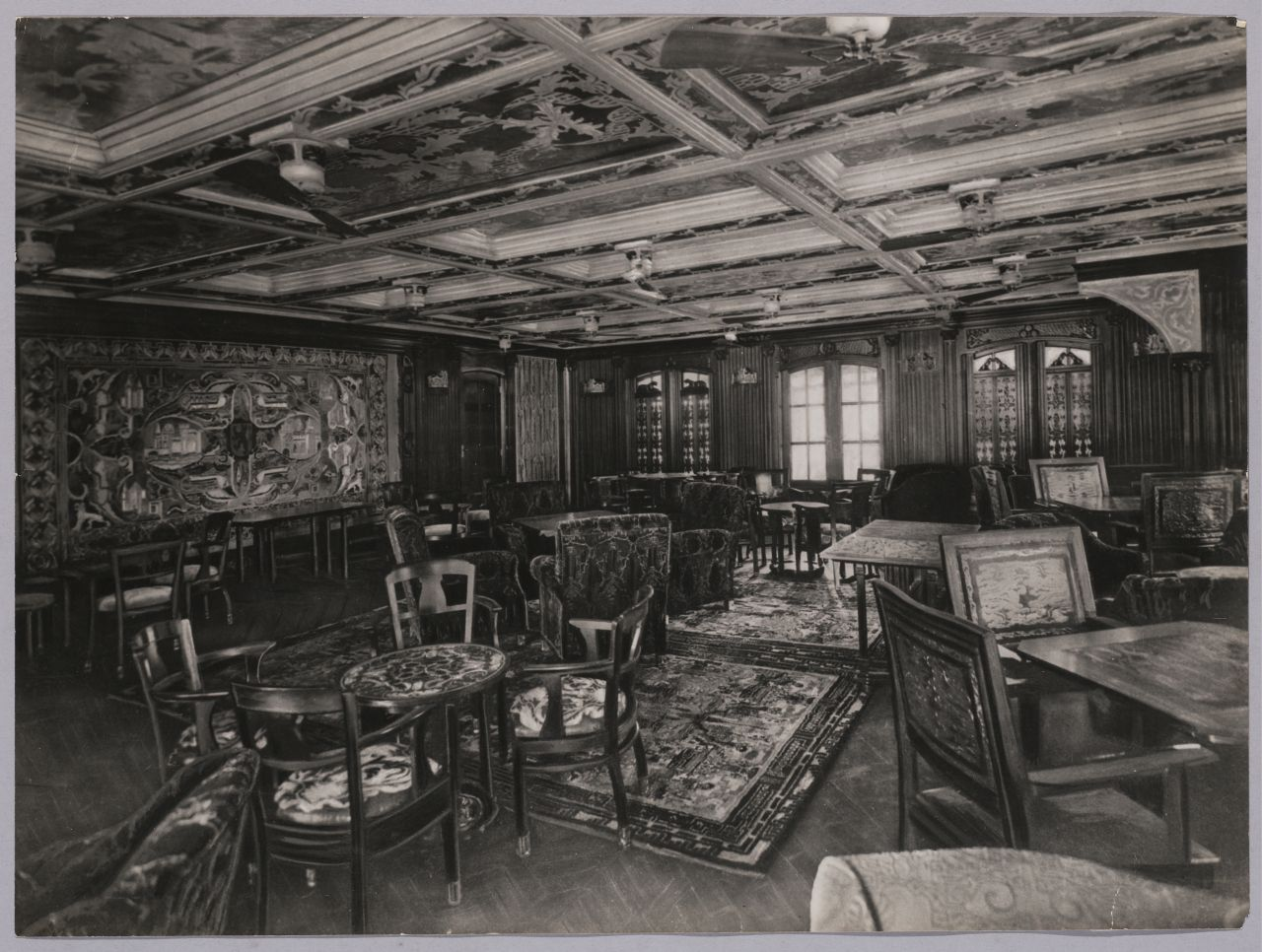
Interior SS Veendam

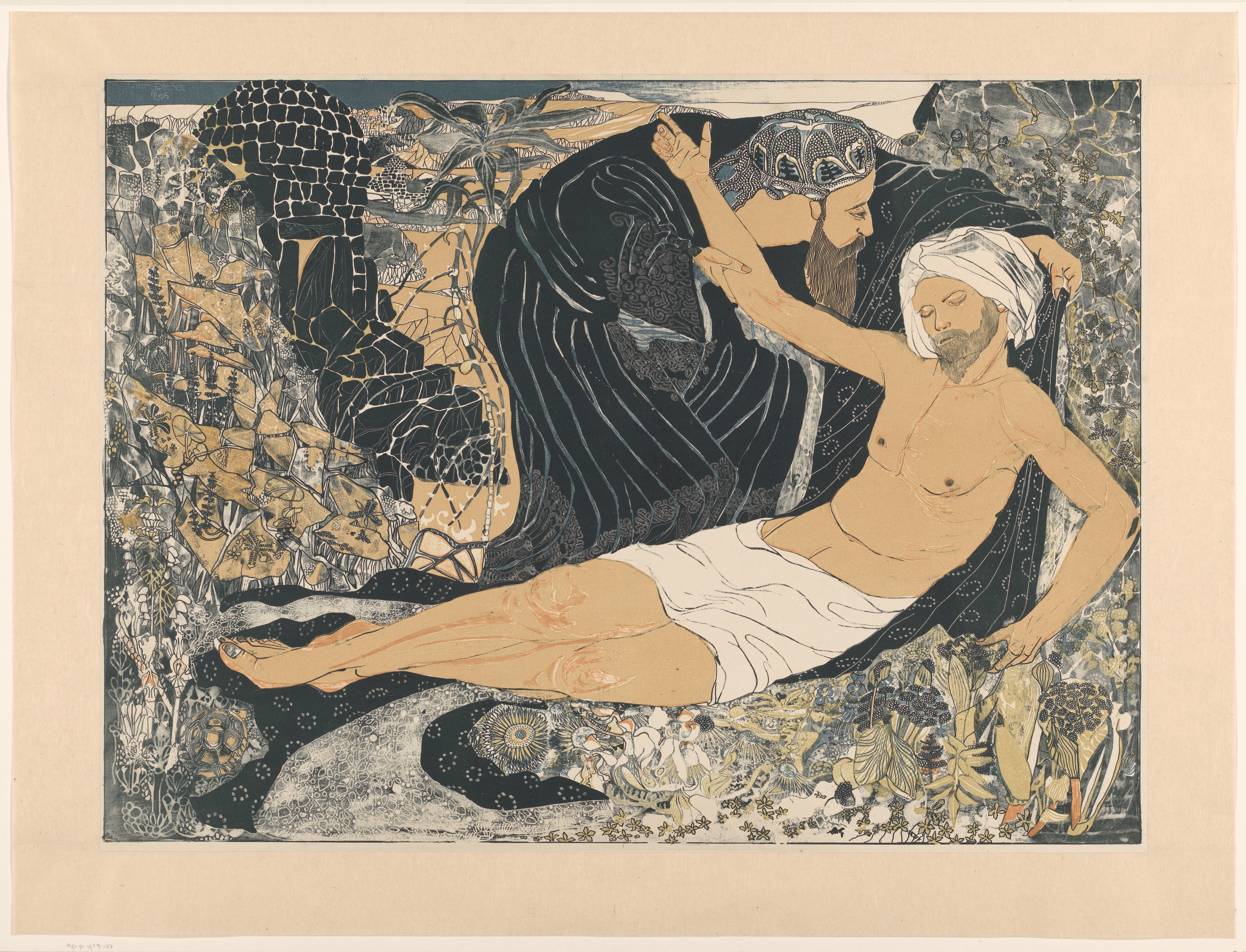
The Good Samaritan, 1896

== Selected publications ==
- Carel Adolph Lion Cachet, Antonette Does-de Haan. C.A. Lion Cachet, 1864-1945. Drents Museum, 1994
- Carel Adolph Lion Cachet, Brief van Carel Adolph Lion Cachet aan Henri Gilius Samson (1856-1921): UB: HSS-mag.: Hh 16.
- Carel Adolph Lion Cachet, Stoomvaart Maatschappij Nederland (Amsterdam). Stoomvaart Maatschappij "Nederland N.V," 1915.
