= 2022 World Monuments Watch =

The World Monuments Watch is a flagship advocacy program of the New York–based private non-profit organization World Monuments Fund (WMF) that calls international attention to cultural heritage around the world that is threatened by neglect, vandalism, conflict, or disaster.

== Selection process ==
Every two years, it publishes a select list known as the Watch List of Endangered Sites that are in urgent need of preservation funding and protection. The sites are nominated by governments, conservation professionals, site caretakers, non-government organizations (NGOs), concerned individuals, and others working in the field. An independent panel of international experts then select 100 candidates from these entries to be part of the Watch List, based on the significance of the sites, the urgency of the threat, and the viability of both advocacy and conservation solutions. For the succeeding two-year period until a new Watch List is published, these 100 sites can avail grants and funds from the WMF, as well as from other foundations, private donors, and corporations by capitalizing on the publicity and attention gained from the inclusion on the Watch List.

== 2022 Watch List ==
The 2022 Watch List call for nomination was announced in spring 2021 with the deadline on May 1, 2021. More than 200 nominees were submitted. Twenty five sites were selected to be included in the list, announced on March 1, 2022.

Site	Image	Location
Abydos		El Balyana, Egypt
Africatown		Mobile, Alabama, United States
Alcântara and Rocha do Conde d'Óbidos Maritime Stations (Almada Negreiros Murals)		Lisbon, Portugal
Asante Traditional Buildings		near Kumasi, Ashanti Region, Ghana
Benghazi Historic City Center		Benghazi, Libya
Cultural Landscape of the Bunong People		Mondulkiri Province, Cambodia
Fabric Synagogue of Timișoara		Timișoara, Romania
Fortified Manors of Yongtai		Yongtai County, Fujian, China
Garcia Pasture		Cameron County, Texas, United States
Heritage Buildings of Beirut		Beirut, Lebanon
Hitis (Water Fountains) of the Kathmandu Valley		Kathmandu Valley, Nepal
Hurst Castle		Milford on Sea, England, United Kingdom
Kinchela Aboriginal Boys Training Home		Kinchela, New South Wales, Australia
Koagannu Mosques and Cemetery		Addu City, Maldives
La Maison du Peuple, Ouagadougou		Ouagadougou, Burkina Faso
Lamanai		Orange Walk District, Belize
Monte Alegre State Park		Pará, Brazil
Mosque City of Bagerhat		Bagerhat District, Bangladesh
Nuri		Northern State, Sudan
Soqotra Archipelago		Socotra Governorate, Yemen
Sumba Island		East Nusa Tenggara, Indonesia
Teotihuacan		San Juan Teotihuacan, State of Mexico, Mexico
The Tomb of Mughal Emperor Jahangir		Lahore, Pakistan
Tiretta Bazaar		Kolkata, West Bengal, India
Yanacancha-Huaquis Cultural Landscape		Miraflores District, Yauyos, Peru
