= Jan Duiker =

Dutch architect (1890–1935)

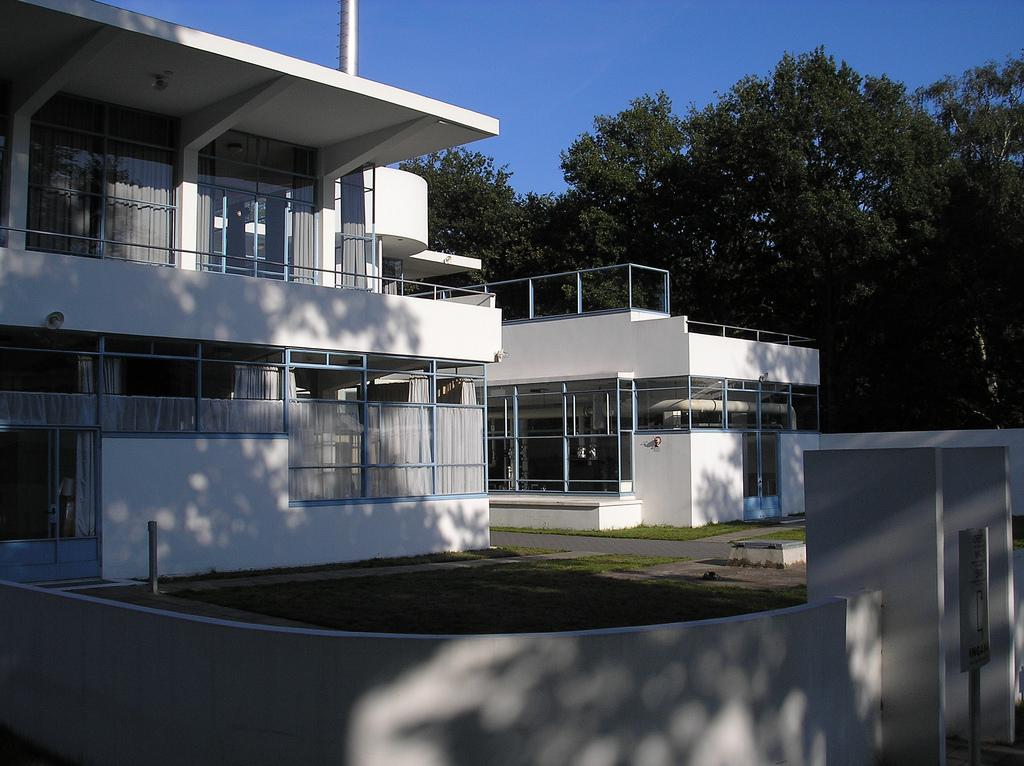

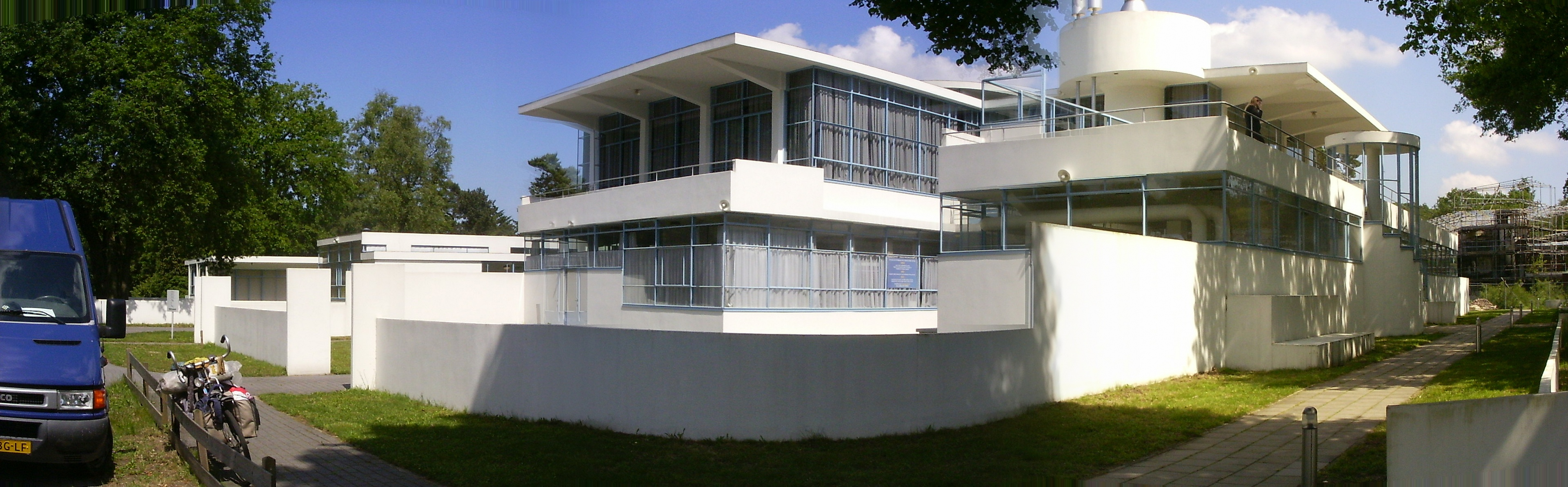
Zonnestraal Sanatorium by Jan Duiker (and Bernard Bijvoet) in Hilversum, 1926-1928

Jan Duiker (also Johannes Duiker) (The Hague, 1 March 1890 – Amsterdam, 23 February 1935) was a Dutch architect. Partnership with Bernard Bijvoet from 1917 until 1935. For the commission of the Zonnestraal project the architects were recommended by Hendrik Berlage. Bijvoet's first wife Jacoba Ezerman was closely related to the'grand man' of Zonnestraal, Jan van Zutphen. Bijvoet left the Netherlands in 1925, where after some time, he started to work in Paris with Pierre Chareau for projects such as Maison de Verre et al. Meanwhile he continued to collaborate with Duiker and returned in 1945. Jan Duiker is one of the most important representatives of the Modern movement,'Het Nieuwe Bouwen'. He is buried at Zorgvlied cemetery.

== Notable work ==
- Town houses in The Hague (1919-1922): J.v.Oldenbarneveldtlaan, Imhoffplein, Jacob Catslaan, Eikstraat, Ieplaan, Thomsonlaan, Thomsonplein etc.
- "Meer en Bosch", residential area with villas in The Hague-Kijkduin (1921-1923).
- Single-family house in Aalsmeer (1924-1925).
- "Zonnestraal", sanatorium in Hilversum (project studies since 1919, construction 1926-1928). Nomination for UNESCO World Heritage.
- "Nirwana", residential building in The Hague (1928-1930).
- "Openluchtschool", open air school in Amsterdam-South (1929-1930).
- "Derde Ambachtschool", third technical school in The Hague-Scheveningen (1930-1931).
- "Cineac", cinema in Amsterdam (1934).
- "Winter", department store in Amsterdam (1934-1935), demolished.
- "Gooiland", hotel and theatre in Hilversum (1934-1936), finished by Bernard Bijvoet in 1936.

== Literature ==
- Jan Molema, "Jan Duiker", works and projects, preface by Kenneth Frampton, Barcelona 1991. (English/Spanish)
- Jan Molema et al., ir. Jan Duiker, constructeur in stuc en staal, Stichting BOUW, Rotterdam 1982.
- Suzy Leemans and Jan Molema, Bernard Bijvoet, cher maître van de Nederlandse architectuur, Vantilt, Nijmegen 2014 (English ed. JAPSAM ed. 2025)
- Paul Meurs and Marie-Therese van Thoor (eds.), "Zonnestraal Sanatorium - The History and Restoration of a Modern Monument", 18 articles by Hubert-Jan Henket, Ton Idsinga, Wessel de Jonge, Jan Molema, Bruno Reichlin et al., Rotterdam 2010. (English Edition)
