= Hubert-Jan Henket =

Dutch architect (born 1940)

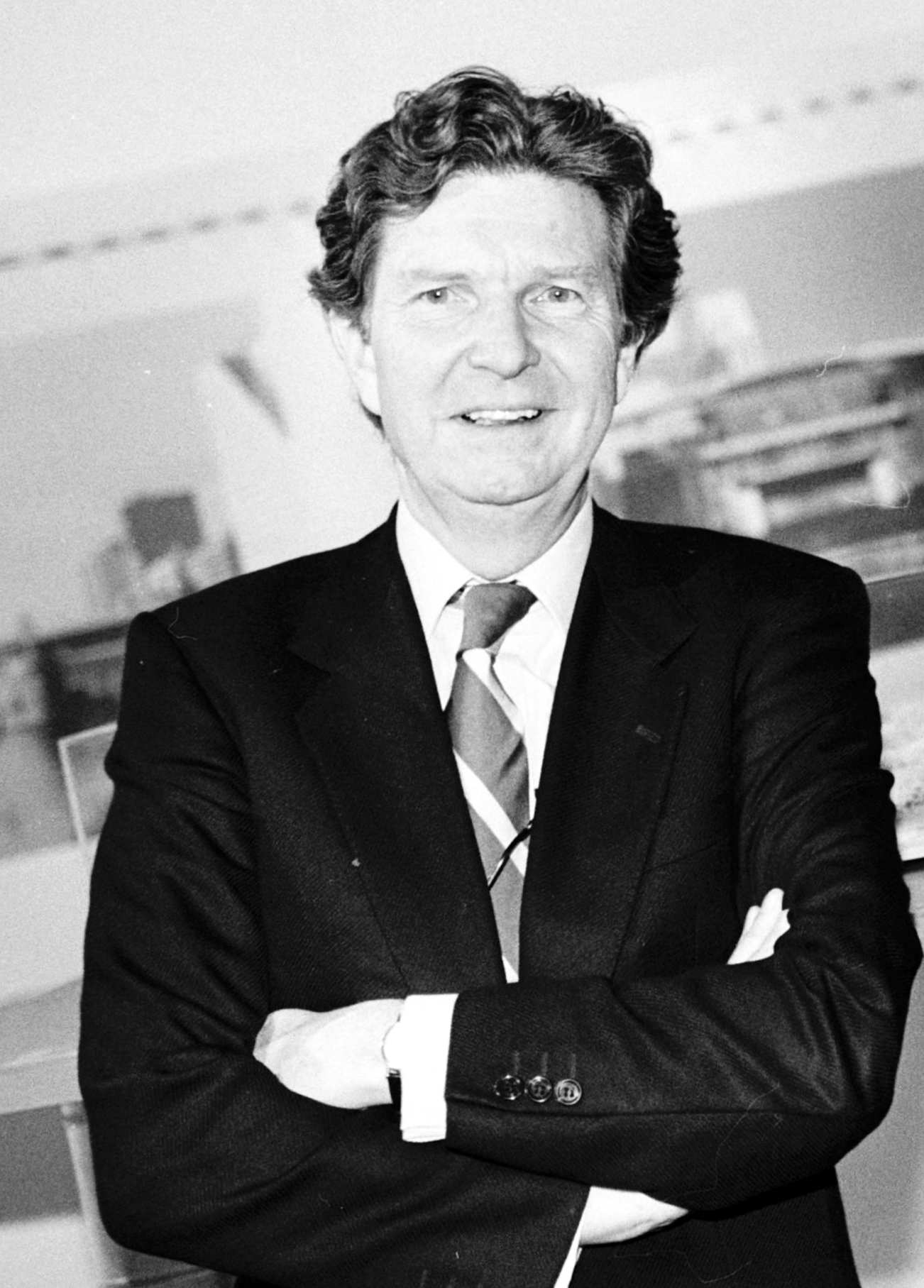
Hubert-Jan Henket in 1997

Hubert-Jan Henket (Dutch: [ˈɦybərt ˈjɑn ɦɛŋˈkɛt]; born 11 March 1940) is a Dutch architect. He is a specialist in the relations between old and new buildings, the redesign of buildings, renovation and restoration. He is the founder of DOCOMOMO international.

== Life ==
Henket was born on 11 March 1940 in Heerlen. He graduated in 1969 cum laude in architecture from the Technische Hogeschool Delft (Delft University of Technology) where he was taught by Jaap Bakema and Aldo van Eyck. In 1969–1970, he was given a grant by the Finnish government to study urbanism at the Otaniemi university of Helsinki, Teknillinen korkeakoulu. He worked with the Finnish architect Reima Pietilä. Between 1970 and 1974 he worked for Castle Park Dean Hook architects in London. Acting for this company, he was director of the Housing Renewal Unit in London from 1974 until 1976. In 1976, Henket started his own architectural practice in the Netherlands " Hubert-Jan Henket architecten". When he handed over the directorship of the office to Janneke Bierman in 2005, the name was changed to "Henket and partners architects" and in 2010 to "Bierman Henket architects". Since then, the practice has facilitated his architectural activities.

When he started working in London, Henket began teaching at The Bartlett School of Architecture of University College London. In 1976, he became "wetenschappelijk hoofdmedewerker" (scientific staff member) in renovation technique at the Technische Hogeschool Delft. From 1984 to 1998, he was professor in building technology at the Technische Universiteit Eindhoven (Eindhoven University of Technology), and from 1998 until in 2005, he held one of the chairs in architecture at Delft University of Technology.

In 1988, Henket and Wessel de Jonge founded Docomomo International, the working party for the documentation and conservation of buildings, neighborhoods and landscapes of the Modern Movement. The organization has 73 chapters worldwide. Henket is the honorary president of the organization. In 1999, the Dutch Broadcasting Corporation showed the documentary Hubert-Jan Henket, man van staal, hout en glas (Hubert-Jan Henket, man of steel, wood and glass) in the documentary series "Het Uur van de Wolf".

== Work ==
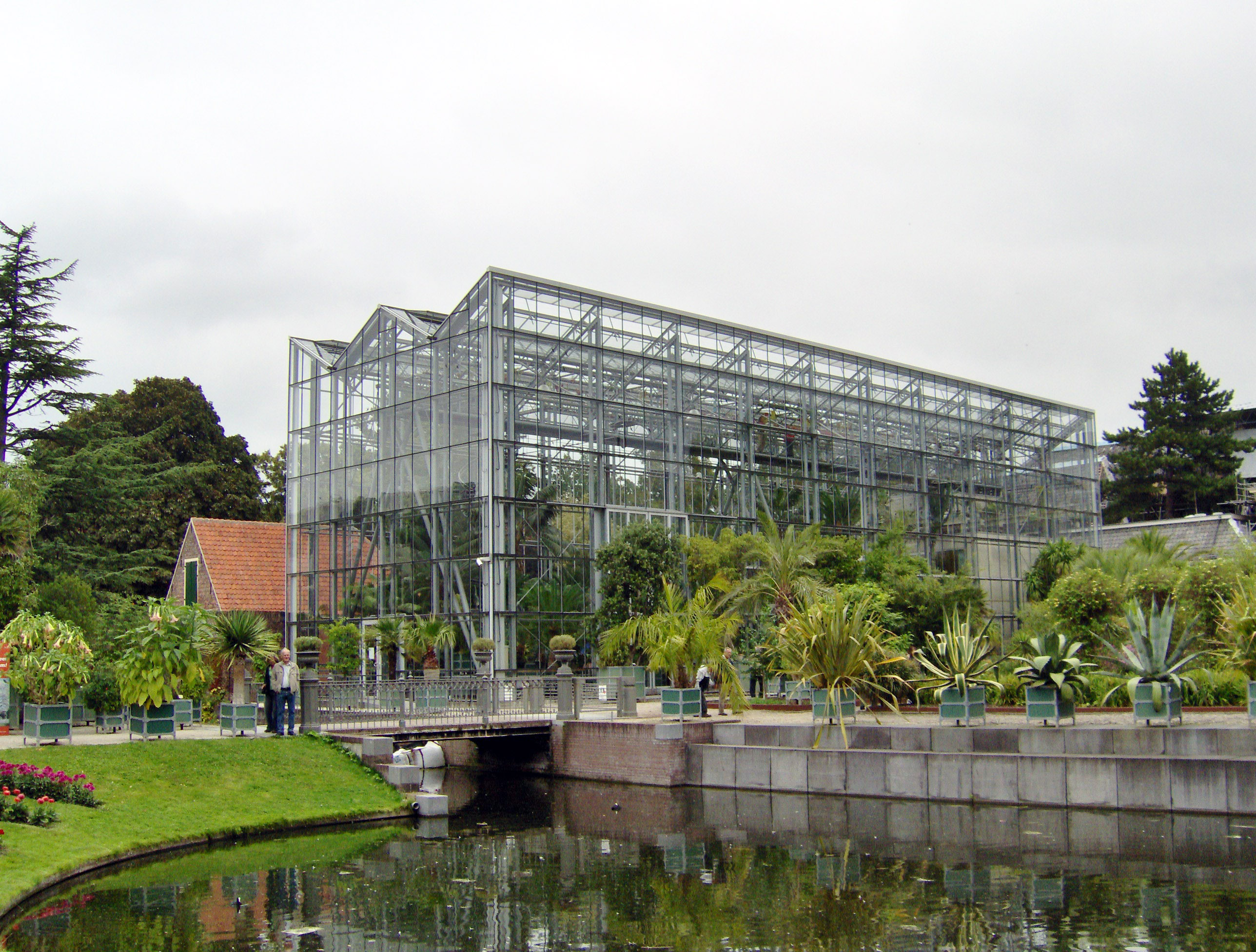
Winter Garden of the Hortus botanicus Leiden

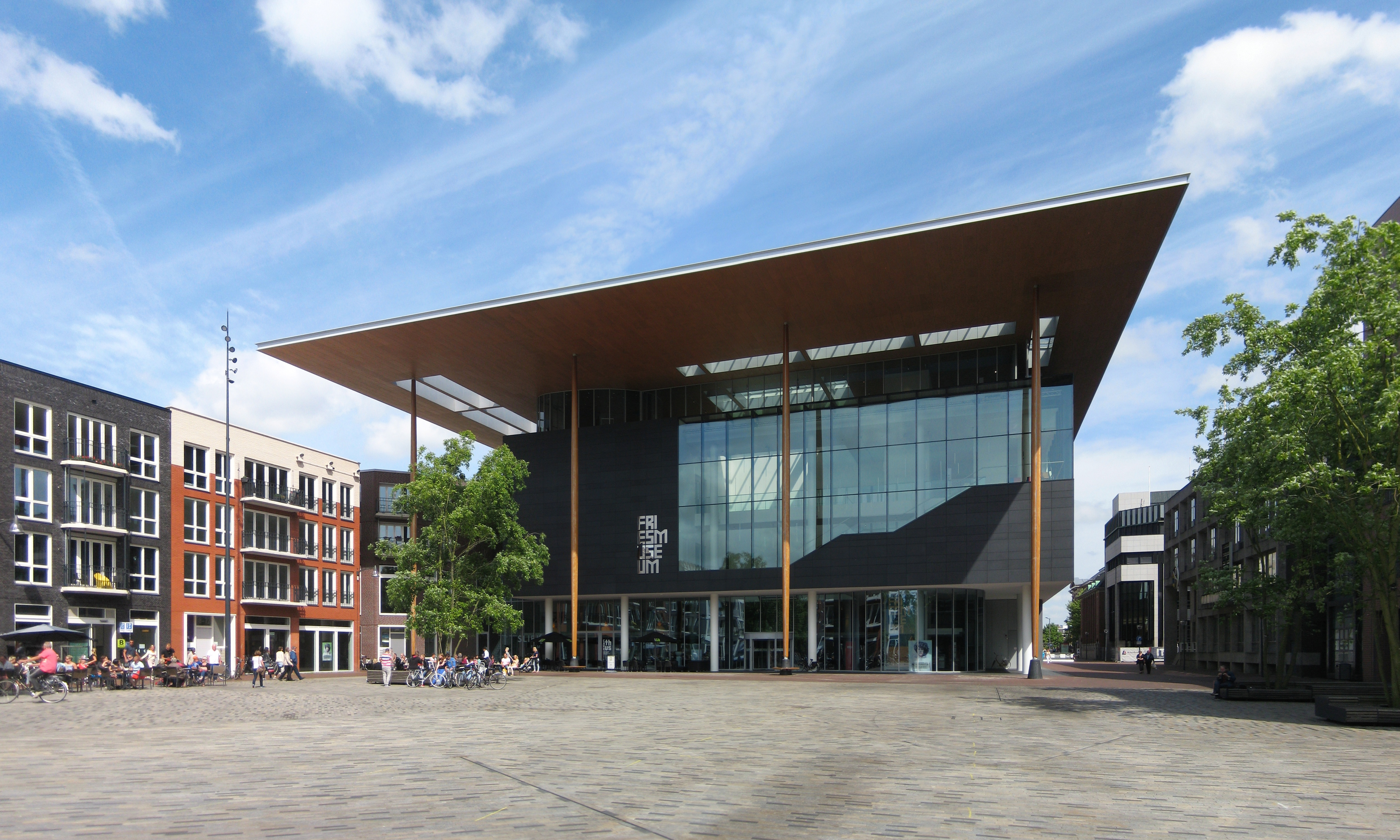
The Fries Museum in Leeuwarden

New buildings designed by Henket are amongst others the headquarters of the White Fathers Missionary in Dar es Salaam Tanzania, the law court buildings in Middelburg and Haarlem, the government building Ceramique in Maastricht, the wintergarden of the Hortus Botanicus in Leiden, the underground building for the faculties of theatre and dance of the ARTEZ academy in Arnhem, the Maastheatre in Rotterdam, a house near Graaff Reinet in the Great Karoo South Africa, a house near Batumi in Georgia, a house in Aerdenhout and the Dutch Embassy in Bangkok Thailand (together with Janneke Bierman).

Examples of building extensions and adaptive reuse designed by Henket are the Teylers Museum in Haarlem, the van Beuningen-de Vriese Pavilion of Museum Boymans van Beuningen in Rotterdam, het Brabants Museum and het Stedelijk Museum s'Hertogenbosch (together with Janneke Bierman), Museum de Fundatie in Zwolle, Museum het Catharijne Convent in Utrecht, the cultural centre de Verkade fabriek in s'Hertogenbosch and the royal palace Huis ten Bosch in the Hague.

Examples of restorations of 20th century buildings are Zonnestraal sanatorium (1928-1931) by Jan Duiker and Bernard Bijvoet in Hilversum (together with Wessel de Jonge) and the Academy of fine arts (1956) by Gerrit Rietveld in Arnhem. He was the supervising architect for the restoration of the Beurs van Berlage in Amsterdam, consultant for the restoration of the College Neerlandais (1931) by Willem Marinus Dudok in Paris and for the Centennial Hall (1911-1913) by Max Berg in Wrocław Poland.

He was invited and participated in the limited competitions for the Nederlands Architectuur Instituut (NAi) in Rotterdam (1988), het Rijksmuseum (2004), the Stedelijk Museum (2005) and the Hermitage(2005) all in Amsterdam.

From 1996 until 2008, he was the supervisor of architecture of Amsterdam Airport Schiphol, he is a member of the supervising teams of among others het Hart van Zuid in Hengelo, de Spoorzone in Tilburg, and the Afsluitdijk.

== Recognition ==
In 1999, Henket won the Prins Bernhard Cultuurfonds) Prize for his oeuvre. In 2003, he was appointed a Knight in the Orde van de Nederlandse Leeuw (Order of the Dutch Lion). In 2004, he and Wessel de Jonge won" the BNA Kubus" of the Dutch Federation of Architects because of their contribution to the re-vitalization of architectioral heritage. Henket also won the "Victor de Steurs prijs", the "Scheudersprijs" for subterranean building and the "Bouwprijs" 2005. In 2007, the Fries Museum in Leeuwarden and the "Glaspaleis" in Heerlen honoured him with an exhibition of his work. In 2013, together with Wessel de Jonge he received the World Monuments Fund Knoll Prize for Modernism. In 2015, he was made an Honorary Fellow of the RIAI.

== Publications ==
- Bouwen is dienstverlenen: op zoek naar geschikte technologie; ontwerpen is balanceren, H.A.J. Henket (1986); inaugural speech TU Eindhoven
- Bouwtechnisch onderzoek 'Jongere bouwkunst'; Deel 1: Methode restauratiekeuze, H.A.J. Henket, W. de Jonge, joint publication of TU Delft and TU Eindhoven (1987); commissioned by Rijksdienst voor de Monumentenzorg
- Bouwtechnisch onderzoek 'Jongere bouwkunst'; Deel 2: Demonstratie Dresselhuys paviljoen, gezamenlijke uitgave van de TU Delft en de TU Eindhoven (1987), commissioned by Rijksdienst voor de Monumentenzorg
- Conference proceedings: first international conference, September 12–15, 1990, H.A.J. Henket; Wessel de Jonge, joint publication of Technische Universiteit Eindhoven and Rijksdienst voor Archeologie, Cultuurlandschap en Monumenten (1991), ISBN 9038600615
- Takamasa Kuniyasu: return to the self, H.A.J. Henket, Paul Panhuysen, Lucas van Beeck, Het Apollohuis (1992); ISBN 9071638162
- Back from Utopia: the challenge of the Modern Movement, H.A.J. Henket, Hilde Heynen; 010 Publishers (2002); ISBN 9064504830
- Het Nieuwe Bouwen en restaureren: het bepalen van de gevolgen van restauratiemogelijkheden: onderzoek, H.A.J. Henket, W. de Jonge, joint publication of Rijksdienst voor de Monumentenzorg en SDU (1990); ISBN 9012065402
- "Waar Nieuw en Oud Raken, een pleidooi voor houdbare moderniteit in architectuur", Hubert-Jan Henket, Uitgeverij Lexturis.nl (2013) ISBN 978-94-6226000-9
