= Wessel de Jonge =

Dutch architect, architectural historian and university teacher

- Born: 1957 (age 68–69)
- Occupations: architect, architectural historian, professor
- Awards: World Monuments Fund, Knoll Modernism Prize 2010
- Practice: WDJArchitecten
- Buildings: Van Nelle Factory; Dutch pavilion Zonnestraal (estate)

Wessel de Jonge (born 1957) is a Dutch architect, architectural historian and professor of heritage & design at the Department of Architectural Engineering and Technology of the TU Delft. He is specialized in the restoration and re-use of 20th-century buildings.

== Live and work ==
Wessel de Jonge is the son of architect Leo de Jonge (1919-2009) and Nelly Burggraaff. He studied at the Faculty of Architecture and the Built Environment of the Delft University of Technology, where he graduated in 1985.

In 1988 in cooperation with Hubert-Jan Henket he founded Docomomo International, the working party for the documentation and conservation of buildings, neighborhoods and landscapes of the Modern Movement. The organization grew over the years towards 73 chapters worldwide.

Renovation works

- Zonnestraal (estate), former Sanatorium Zonnestraal of 1928–31 with Bierman Henket Architects
- Dutch pavilion, the Gerrit Rietveld's Biennale Pavilion in Venice of 1953-1954
- Van Nelle Factory in Rotterdam (1928–31)
- Former Technical Schools in Groningen (1923)
- St.Jobs warehouse (1914)
- HUF building (1953) in Rotterdam
- Social Security Building GAK (1959)
- National Aerospace Laboratories NLR in Amsterdam from the 1950s
- Revitalisation of 1938 Olympic Stadium in Helsinki

== Publications (selection) ==
- Paul Meurs and Marie-Therese van Thoor (eds.), "Zonnestraal Sanatorium - The History and Restoration of a Modern Monument", 18 articles by Hubert-Jan Henket, Ton Idsinga, Wessel de Jonge, Jan Molema, Bruno Reichlin et al., Rotterdam 2010.
- Marieke Kuipers, Wessel de Jonge. Designing from Heritage: Strategies for Conservation and Conversion. TU Delft, 2017.
