= 2018 World Monuments Watch =

The World Monuments Watch is a flagship advocacy program of the New York-based private non-profit organization World Monuments Fund (WMF) that calls international attention to cultural heritage around the world that is threatened by neglect, vandalism, conflict, or disaster.

== Selection process ==
Every two years, it publishes a select list known as the Watch List of Endangered Sites that are in urgent need of preservation funding and protection. The sites are nominated by governments, conservation professionals, site caretakers, non-government organizations (NGOs), concerned individuals, and others working in the field. An independent panel of international experts then select 100 candidates from these entries to be part of the Watch List, based on the significance of the sites, the urgency of the threat, and the viability of both advocacy and conservation solutions. For the succeeding two-year period until a new Watch List is published, these 100 sites can avail grants and funds from the WMF, as well as from other foundations, private donors, and corporations by capitalizing on the publicity and attention gained from the inclusion on the Watch List.

== 2018 Watch List ==
The 2018 World Monuments Watch List of Endangered Sites was announced on October 16, 2017, by WMF President Joshua David. The 2018 Watch List highlights the threats to cultural heritage sites posed by human conflict, natural disaster, climate change, and urbanization.

Site^{[A]}	Image	Location^{[B]}
Disaster Sites of the Caribbean, the Gulf, and Mexico		
Government House		St. John's, Antigua and Barbuda
Sirius Building		Millers Point, Sydney, Australia
Ramal Talca-Constitución		Talca Province, Chile
Grand Theater, Prince Kung's Mansion		Beijing, China
Eliyahu Hanavi Synagogue		Alexandria, Egypt
Takiyyat Ibrahim al-Gulshani		Cairo, Egypt
Potager du Roi		Versailles, France
Post-Independence Architecture of Delhi		Delhi, India
Al-Hadba' Minaret		Mosul, Iraq
Lifta		Jerusalem, Israel
Amatrice		Amatrice, Italy
Kagawa Prefectural Gymnasium		Takamatsu, Kagawa Prefecture, Japan
Jewish Quarter of Essaouira		Essaouira, Morocco
Sukur Cultural Landscape		Madagali Local Government Area, Nigeria
Historic Karachi		Karachi, Pakistan
Cerro de Oro		Cañete Valley, Peru
Tebaida Leonesa		El Bierzo, León, Spain
Souk of Aleppo		Aleppo, Syria
Chao Phraya River		Bangkok, Thailand
Blackpool Piers		Blackpool, United Kingdom
Buffalo Central Terminal		Buffalo, New York, United States
Alabama Civil Rights Sites		Alabama, United States
Old City of Ta’izz		Ta'izz, Yemen
Matobo Hills Cultural Landscape		Matobo, Matabeleland South, Zimbabwe

== Notes ==
A. Names and spellings used for the sites were based on the official 2018 Watch List as published.
B. The references to the sites' locations and periods of construction were based on the official 2018 Watch List as published.
