= Zonnestraal (estate) =

Former sanatorium in Hilversum, the Netherlands

Coordinates: 52°12′02″N 5°09′14″E

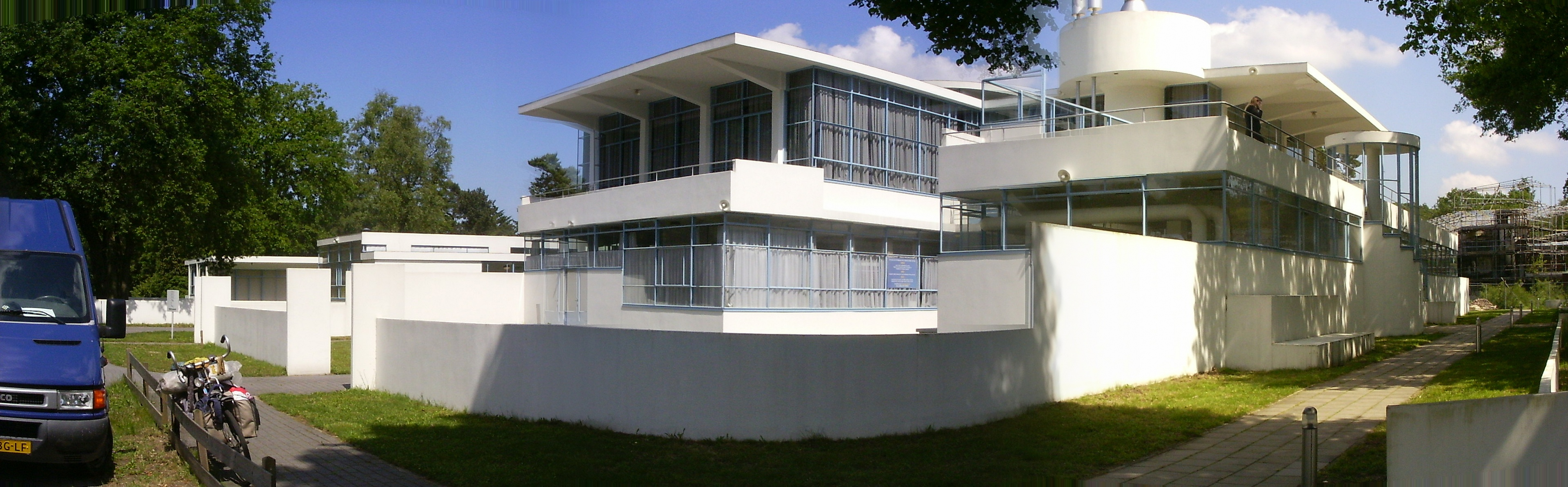
- Interactive map of the Zonnestraal area

General information
- Architectural style: Modern (Nieuwe Bouwen)
- Location: Hilversum, Netherlands, Loosdrechtse Bos 5-21
- Construction started: 1925
- Completed: 1931

Design and construction
- Architects: Jan Duiker, Bernard Bijvoet

The estate Zonnestraal is a former sanatorium in Hilversum, the Netherlands. The building was designed by architects Jan Duiker Bernard Bijvoet and Jan Gerko Wiebenga, and is an example of the Nieuwe Bouwen. In 1995, the estate was submitted to UNESCO's list of World Heritage Sites, but it was ultimately not listed.

Hubert-Jan Henket (Bierman Henket Architecten) and Wessel de Jonge Architecten were awarded the 2010 World Monuments Fund/ Knoll Modernism Prize for their restoration of the Zonnestraal Sanatorium.

Deitrich Neumann, from the Department of History of Art and Architecture, Brown University, Providence, one of the members of the jury, stated "this careful restoration does full justice to the subtleties of the original building, its particular handling of light, and the seeming weightlessness of its composition. In this project, practical conservation and thorough scholarship reinforced each other in finding the best approach to the preservation of one of modern architecture's most important buildings."

== Architecture ==
Zonnestraal was built as a tuberculosis sanatorium in the 1920s and 1930s. The building features the classic design of the sanatorium, which focuses on as much open space and fresh air as possible. However, it still embodies the definition of the modern architecture by the immense amount of repetition, bold geometric shapes and the avoidance of superfluous decoration. The building is mostly made of transparent materials to allow as much light as possible to enter the patients' rooms. With this transparency, the building runs a large risk of overheating. However, the architects understood these risks and incorporated a cooling system in the building; something that was not common at this point in time. The surfaces that are not transparent are very sterile and smooth in appearance making very hygienic surroundings. The buildings are arranged in a loose "pin-wheel" design that created separation between patients' rooms, giving each of them the adequate amount of sunlight needed for therapy. The distribution of space in this manner created the ability for every patient to have a sunbathing balcony that was unobstructed by any other patient's room or building. The design of this architecture can be referred to as Heliotherapeutic Architecture (Light therapy) and was actually a short lived style in its purpose for therapy because of the discovery of the cure for tuberculosis. However, this style focuses on the engineering required to satisfy the patient's needs. In fact, the architects preferred to refer to themselves as building engineers. After abandonment in the 1980s the building was submitted to UNESCO's list of World Heritage Sites. However, with this submittal, the building's structural deterioration could not be solved by demolition and rebuilding. Instead new techniques of concrete repair had to be used.

== Influence ==
The presence of tuberculosis and the sanatorium played a large role in modern architecture. Though it was not the first building to feature a nearly all glass architecture, after the sanatorium period, the style of all glass buildings stayed a constant in modern architecture. It has been said that the famous Paimio Sanatorium in Finland by Alvar Aalto was greatly influenced by Zonnestraal; it is known that Aalto had visited Zonnestraal in 1928 just prior to the design of Paimio, and its organization of space is based on the same heliotropic arrangement of white concrete volumes, with a central building and off-shooting wings, but Zonnestraal is completely symmetrical in layout, whilst Paimio is organic, sat in a rolling terrain amidst a dense forest. With the construction of sanatoriums worldwide, the public began to see the importance of increases hygiene in their homes. The principle established in Zonnestraal, however, was repeated throughout the world. Also, it did not take long for architects to start designing homes following the spacious sanatoriums. These buildings include Sir Arthur Bliss' house built in Surrey or the famous Lovell House designed by Richard Neutra.
