= Maristella Casciato =

Maristella Casciato is an architectural historian serving as Senior Curator and Head of Architecture Special Collections at the Getty Research Institute in Los Angeles, California, USA, from 2016 to the present. Her research focuses on the history of the twentieth-century European architecture and the theory of the conservation of our recent past. She has published books translated in several languages and many peer-reviewed papers.

== Career ==
- Full professor at the University of Bologna School of Architecture (2002–2012).
- Associate director of research at the Canadian Centre for Architecture in Montreal (2012–2015).
- Visiting faculty in several architecture schools in the United States.
- Curated major exhibitions, e.g. "Bauhaus Beginnings" (2019) at the Getty Research Institute, "Casablanca Chandigarh. Reports on Modernization" (2013) at the Canadian Centre for Architecture in Montreal, and "Gio Ponti. Amare l’architettura" at the MAXXI Museum in Rome (2019).
- Chair of Docomomo International from 2002 to 2009.
- Scientific committee member of Nature, Art & Habitat since 2019.

== Books ==
- The Amsterdam School (1996). 010 Publishers
- Casablanca Chandigarh: A Report on Modernization (2014), Tom Avermaete, Maristella Casciato, Mirko Zardini, Canadian Centre for Architecture.
- Rethinking Global Modernism: Architectural Historiography and the Postcolonial (2021), edited by Vikramaditya Prakash, Maristella Casciato, Daniel E. Coslett Routledge.
- The Metropolis in Latin America, 1830-1930: Cityscapes, Photographs, Debates (2021), edited by Idurre Alonso, Maristella Casciato Getty Research Institute, Los Angeles.
- Le Corbusier Album Punjab, 1951 (2024).

== Awards ==
- 1992 Fulbright Fellowship
- 2004 Research grant at the INHA in Paris
- 2010 Mellon Senior Fellowship at the Canadian Centre for Architecture in Montreal
- 2023 Fellow, Society of Architectural Historians
