= Israelite High School (Timișoara) =

Jewish school in Romania

Israelite High School תיכון יהודי Liceul Israelit
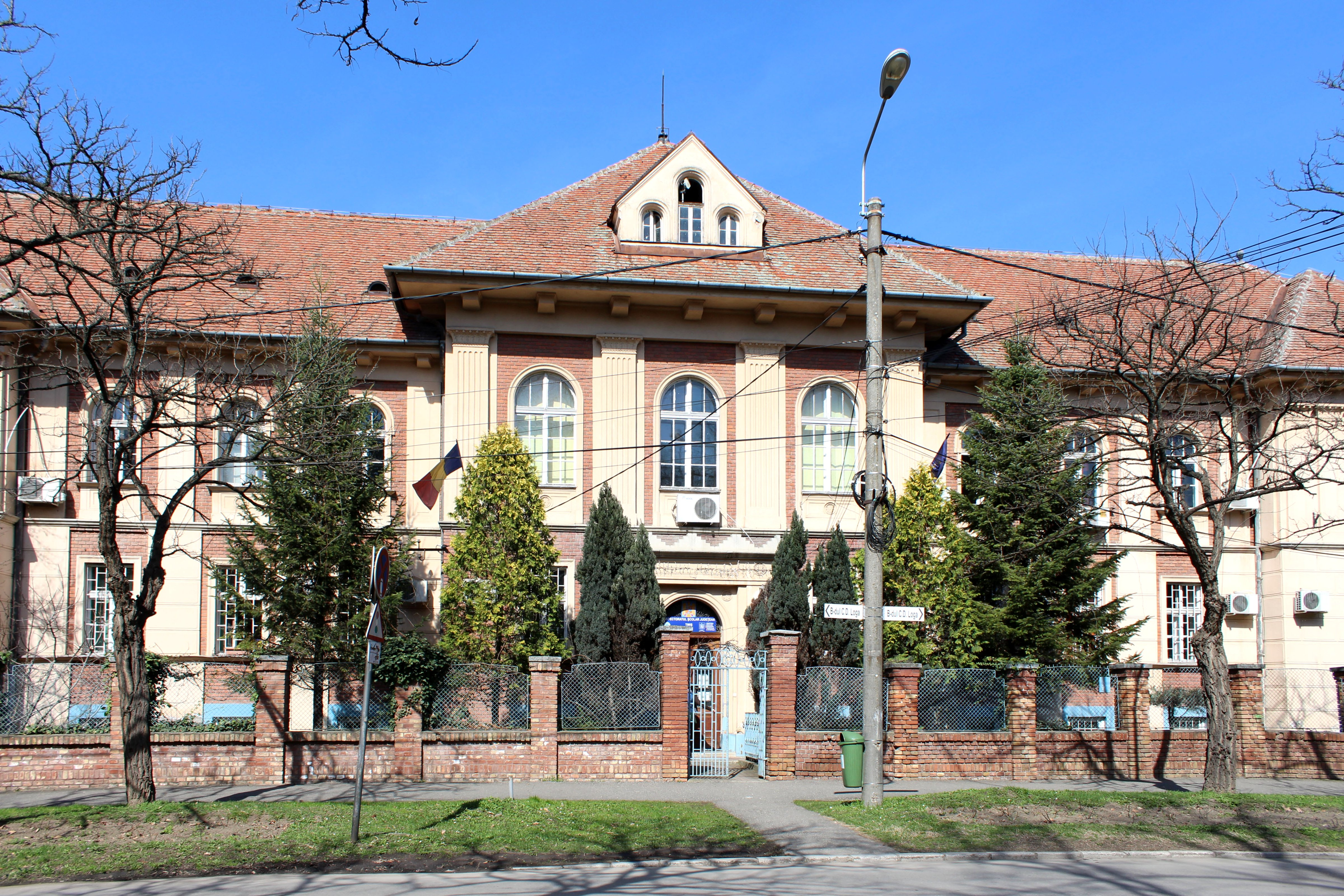
- The former boarding school of the Israelite High School

Location
- 2 Mihai Eminescu Boulevard; Timișoara, Timiș County; Romania
- Coordinates: 45°45′4″N 21°13′40″E

Information
- Denomination: Judaism
- Established: 4 October 1919
- Closed: 3 August 1948
- Gender: Mixed
- Language: Romanian and Hebrew

The Israelite High School was a school of the Jewish community of Timișoara, Romania. The high school operated between 1919 and 1948, with a number of about 700 students. It had four middle school classes for girls, eight theoretical high school classes for boys and eight commercial high school classes for boys. After 1948, the Sports High School and the High School of Fine Arts operated in its premises.

In 2003, the high school buildings were returned to Caritatea Foundation, which in 2014 sold them as land. The current owner wants an urban development that involves the demolition of buildings, which has caused much controversy, both regarding the preservation of the historical heritage of Timișoara, and about what is to be built in place.

== History ==
=== Beginnings of Jewish education ===
The first mention of Jewish education in Timișoara comes from the tombstone of Azriel Assad (d. 1636), rabbi and surgeon, in Timișoara's Sephardic cemetery. Children were taught to read, write and count in cheder in Talmud.

With the development of the city and as a result of the gradual liberalization of the political regime in the Austro-Hungarian Empire, the Jewish community in Timișoara also evolved, reaching almost 7,000 people during World War I (about 10% of the population). Although large, the community did not even have its own primary school. In the 18th and 19th centuries until 1867, education was based on the German language. In the middle of the 19th century, in addition to the traditional religious schools, there were intermittently several Jewish primary schools with German language in Timișoara. Since 1867, the Law of Nationalities (Law XLIV) has considered Jews to be Hungarian citizens of Mosaic faith, and the Education Law (Law XXXVIII) provided for compulsory education, but with Hungarian as the official language of instruction, which led to their rapid assimilation. The desire to avoid complete assimilation and some anti-Semitic manifestations led to the need to establish their own secular schools, but in which the Hebrew language, Judaism and the tradition of the Jewish holidays were taught. But the Jewish society was divided, there were three currents, which had different positions: the Neolog faction (modernist – which recognized the decisions of the Congress of Jewish Communities in Hungary and Transylvania, held in Pest in 1868–1869), the Orthodox one (traditionalist – which rejected these decisions) and the status quo ante one, which ruled in favor of maintaining the pre-congress situation. The teaching of specific subjects, especially religion, differed, so that the schools of each community could only be confessional, which deprived them of the support that state schools received. However, in 1917, on the initiative of teacher Marmorek and with the support of the Hatikva Society, the first Jewish kindergarten was established, and in the following year, the first Israelite primary school (the one in the Iosefin district), under the direction of Leopold Fleischer.

=== Establishment of Israelite high schools ===
At the end of World War I, the Jews of Banat and Transylvania organized themselves into the National Union of Jews of Banat and Transylvania, a body aimed at recognizing Jews as a national minority. This, based on the Declaration of Alba Iulia, created the premise of training in one's own language, in this case Hebrew. At the request addressed to the Resort of Cults and Instruction within the Governing Council by the president of the community, Adolf Vértes, and on the basis of an oral authorization (written approval – authorization no. 23527/1919 – will come only on 2 January 1920), on 4 October 1919, the Israelite Confessional High School began its activity, with 650 students, 401 boys and 249 girls (in mixed classes, co-education system). Of these, 70 were non-Jews. As the mother tongue of all the students was Hungarian, it was designated as the language of instruction, and there were also Hebrew classes. The director of the high school was Victor Déznai. Not yet having its own premises, the courses were held in various places: Lloyd Palace, the headquarters of the Jewish community in Cetate, the Politehnica building on Carol Telbisz Street and other schools. From the beginning there were discussions, the rabbis demanded separate religious classes for the three communities, a requirement that was rejected, but a single program was adopted.

However, confessional schools did not have the right to advertise (diplomas issued by them were not recognized). This right was reserved for state schools; as a result, efforts were made to make the high school state-owned. Since Banat now belonged to Romania, in order to become a state high school, it had to comply with Romanian legislation in the field of education. The requirements were: giving up co-education (separate classes for boys and girls), the state language (Romanian) as the language of instruction (there were classes for other languages: Hebrew, Hungarian, German and French, studied as foreign languages), teachers to be Romanian citizens, the Romanian language to be taught by state teachers, to respect the state curriculum and the regulations in force, to teach according to the approved textbooks, to ensure the salaries and pensions of non-state teachers and to have their own premises.

The most difficult task was the language of instruction. The students did not know enough Romanian or Hebrew to study the various subjects. The Romanian language was considered useful for the future in Romania, and the Hebrew language for contacts abroad, and the Hungarian language was maintained as a transitional language. It was decided that from the school year 1926/1927 the Romanian language and literature, the history and geography of Romania should be taught in Romanian; the language, literature and history of the Jews, as well as religion to be taught in Hebrew; Hungarian language and literature in this language, and other objects in Romanian or Hebrew. The operation of the high school is confirmed by the authorizations no. 51, 52 and 53/1928 issued by the Ministry of National Education.

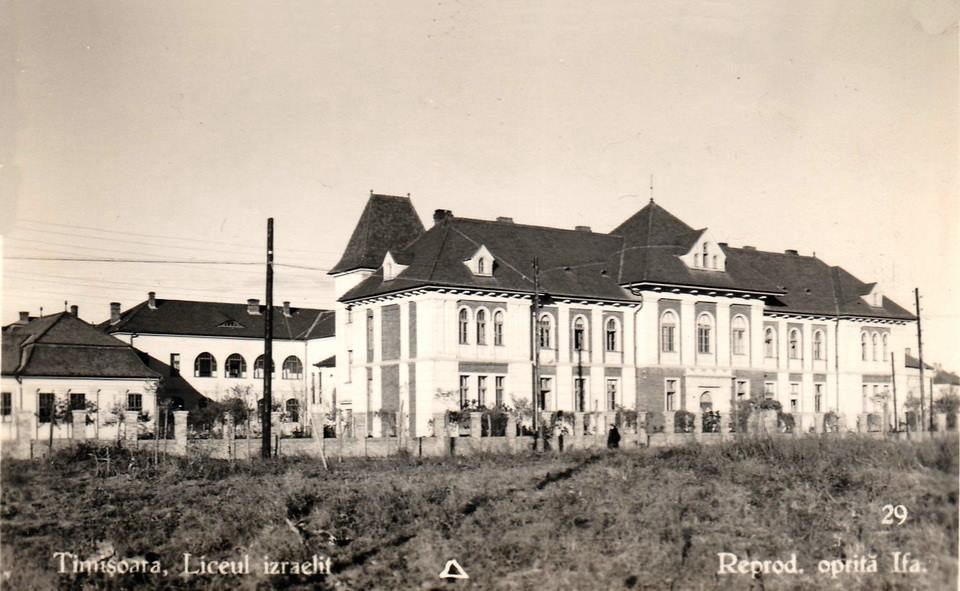
The boarding school building in 1930. The high school building partially appears in the back.

Another major problem was securing its own premises. For this purpose, steps were taken at the town hall to purchase a plot of land of about 8,000 m^{2}, a block currently located between Constantin Diaconovici Loga Boulevard, 20 December 1989 Street, Mihai Eminescu Boulevard and Patriarch Miron Cristea Street. There, on the north side, towards Mihai Eminescu Boulevard, the high school building was built, financed from offertories and donations of the Jewish community. The architects were Jaques Klein and Gideon Neubauer. Initially, in the form put into operation in 1923, the building had a single level and had 16 classrooms, one for gymnastics, one for drawing, a physics and chemistry laboratory, a 1,600-volume library, a chancellery and a principal's office. In 1928 the building was raised. On the ground floor there was a girls' gymnasium and a boys' theoretical high school, and on the first floor there was a boys' commercial high school. Also in 1928, on the south side, towards Constantin Diaconovici Loga Boulevard, László Székely built the boarding school building. The building is made in an eclectic style, with elements of Secession and classicism. The boarding school was planned to accommodate 60 students.

=== Israelite High School during World War II ===
In 1936, the Ministry of Cults and Public Instruction banned religious education for Jewish students in state school buildings. On 29 August 1940, the Gigurtu Cabinet limited the access of Jewish students to high schools and universities to 6%. The decree-law of 11 October 1940 excluded Jews from all state schools, but left open the possibility of establishing their own primary and secondary schools, with exclusively Jewish teachers and students. Under these conditions, the Israelite High School in Timișoara continued its activity during the Antonescu regime, receiving students excluded from other schools. But in the autumn of 1940, the high school building was requisitioned. In 1941, the German military hospital was installed upstairs. In 1942, the entire high school was evacuated, the building becoming the headquarters of the Timișoara Police Headquarters. The courses of the boys' high school continued in the premises of the Israelite Primary School in Fabric (1 Ion Luca Caragiale Street) and in the premises of the Fabric Synagogue, of the commercial high school in the yard of the Fabric Synagogue, and of the girls' gymnasium in the community premises (5 Gheorghe Lazăr Street) or in different private homes. Some of the students, born in 1925, were sent to work detachments as early as April 1943. However, they did not drop out of school, but continued to attend classes in the hours after work. The school, in turn, facilitated this by the fact that the lessons were scheduled after 2 p.m.

On 24–26 December 1939, the Israelite High School in Timișoara hosted the 16th and last Conference of the National Jewish Union in Transylvania (Hungarian: Erdélyi Zsidó Nemzeti Szövetség, abbreviated ZsNSz).

=== After 23 August 1944 ===
After the coup d'état of 23 August 1944, the high school regained its headquarters and the right to advertise. At the 1945 Politehnica entrance exam, out of the first 20 admitted, 19 were among the graduates of the Israelite High School.

The high school ceased its activity in 1948 as a result of the education reform, through which the private and confessional schools were abolished, its patrimony being transferred to state ownership. Until 1948, the high school functioned with four classes of girls' gymnasium, eight classes of boys' theoretical high school and eight classes of boys' commercial high school. After 1948, the Sports High School and the High School of Fine Arts operated in its premises.

=== Retrocession and subsequent evolutions ===
In November 2003, based on Law no. 501/2002 on the restitution of real estate belonging to religious denominations in Romania, the high school buildings were returned to the Caritatea Foundation, which manages the cultural and spiritual heritage of Jews in Romania. The High School of Fine Arts was allowed to function here until 2008 on lease. Due to a significant increase in rent, in 2011 the city hall decided to relocate the high school. Faced with strong opposition from teachers and students' parents, the city hall refused to pay for high school's utilities to force its relocation. The High School of Fine Arts was eventually relocated in 2013.

In 2010, the Caritatea Foundation announced its intention to sell the property. All potential buyers were only interested in the land and not in the buildings they sought to demolish. Because it is located in a historic area designated for conservation, in 2014 the municipality was asked by Caritatea to remove this classification of buildings. The same year, Caritatea sold the buildings and adjacent plots to a Cluj-Napoca-based private company for five million euros. The site was intended for demolition for the purpose of widening traffic lanes and building a mixed-use development with a 47-meter-high sightseeing tower. After debates and civic protests, the investor agreed that the high school and boarding school should not be demolished, but included in the new real estate complex. The idea of building a sightseeing tower was also abandoned, as it would have exceeded the height regime of the buildings in the area. Plans included a museum of the Jewish community in Timișoara, as well as multifunctional spaces for cultural and tourist activities, commercial spaces, an art gallery, a museum of contemporary art and a 450-space parking lot. Even if the project was approved by the local council in November 2019, the zonal urban plan has expired, and the investment has not materialized. Thus, in November 2023, the Romanian Government granted a financing of 6.8 million euros to the Metropolis of Banat for the purchase of the building for its transformation into an educational center.

The former boarding school hosted the County School Inspectorate until July 2019, when it was temporarily moved to the former building of the Banatul Water Basin Administration until the completion of the new headquarters at the former Petru Botiș Agricultural Technological High School in Aradului.

== Notable teachers ==
- Ádám Anavi (1909–2009), writer, poet, playwright and translator
- Max Eisikovits (1908–1983), composer and musicologist
- Leopold Fleischer (1886–1955), philologist
- Ernest Neumann (1917–2004), rabbi
- Ferenc Radó (1921–1990), mathematician

== Notable alumni ==
- Constantin Anatol (1921–2019), actor and director
- Charles Bruck (1911–1995), conductor and teacher
- Ezra Fleischer (1928–2006), poet and philologist
- Peter Freund (1936–2018), physicist and professor
- Ioan Holender (b. 1935), operatic baritone and director of Vienna State Opera (1992–2010)
- Sámuel Izsák (1915–2007), physician and professor
- Abraham Klein (b. 1934), referee
- Toma George Maiorescu (1928–2019), writer, essayist, teacher, politician and poet
- Bernhard Rothenstein (1924–2009), engineer, physicist and professor
- István Szőnyi (1894–1960), painter
- Myriam Yardeni (1932–2015), historian and professor
