= La Maison du Peuple, Ouagadougou =

Coordinates: 12.3722°N 1.5236°W

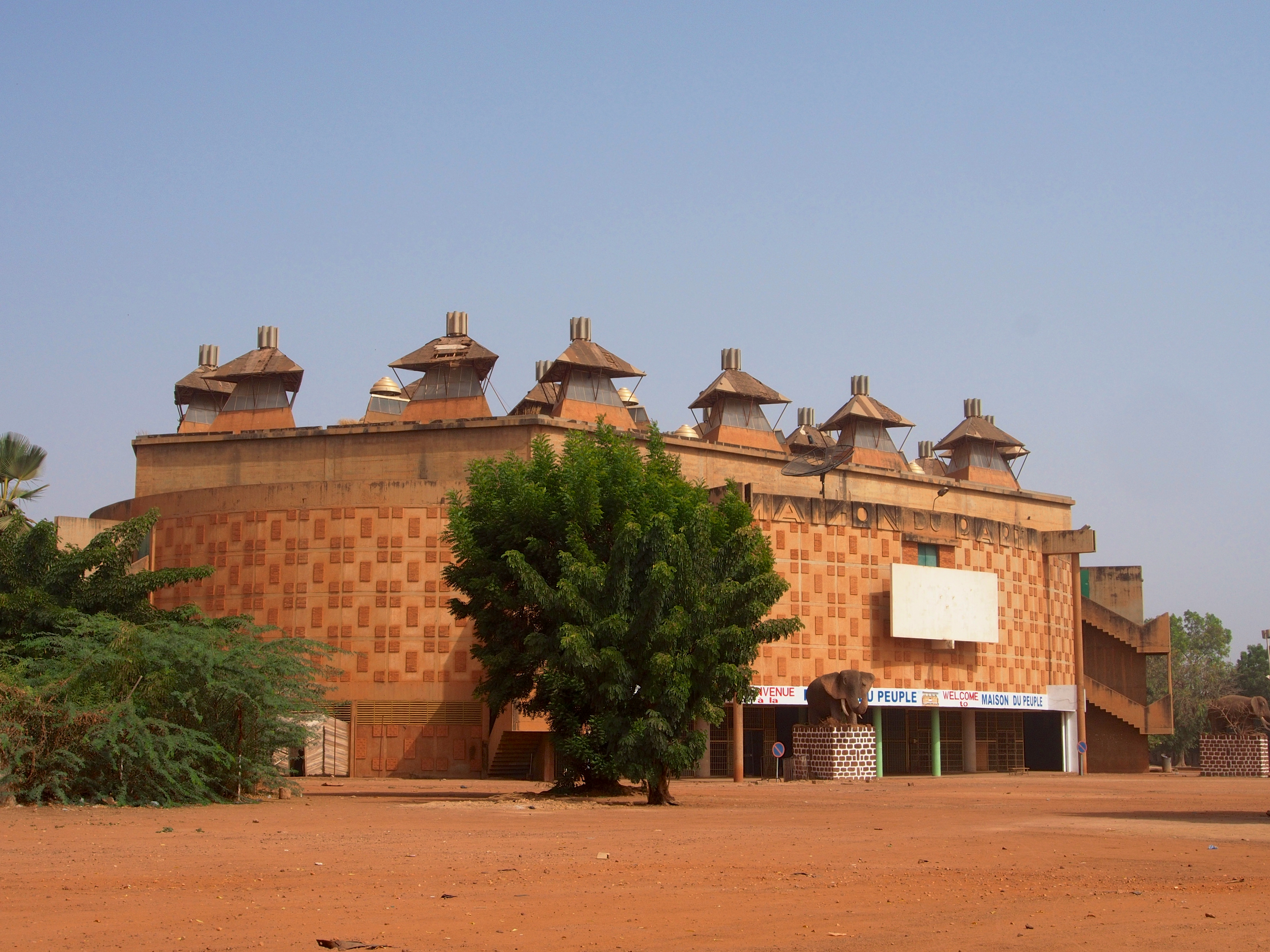
La maison du peuple, 2012

La Maison du Peuple, Ouagadougou is a building in Ouagadougou, Burkina Faso. The building is 2,500-seat theatre that opened in 1965 and is still used for concerts and events. It is considered an important example of modernist architecture. The World Monuments Fund named the building as one of the most threatened buildings of 2022.
