= Fabric Orthodox Synagogue =

- Sinagoga Ortodoxă din Fabric
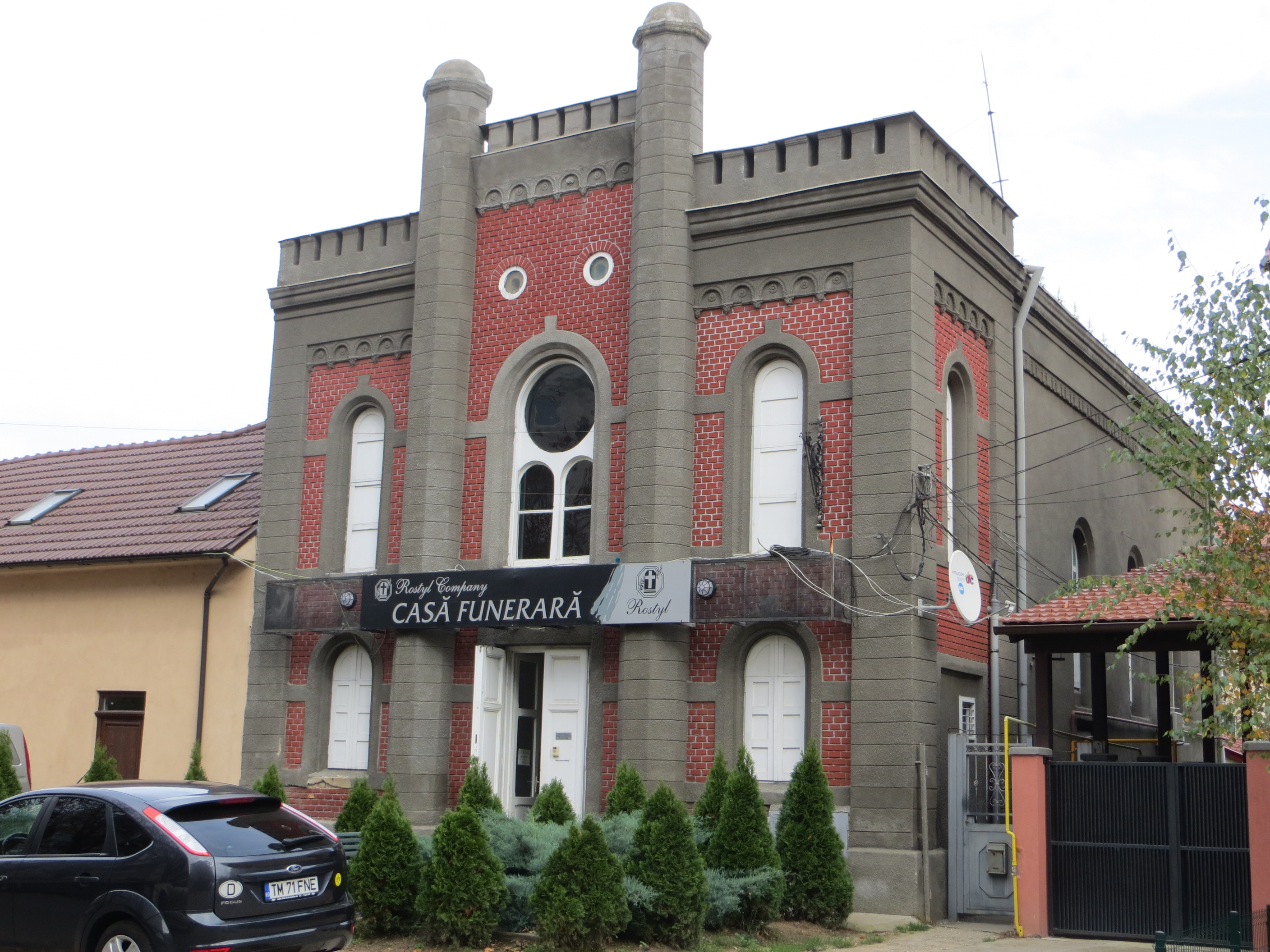
- The synagogue, currently a funeral home

Religion
- Affiliation: Orthodox Judaism
- Ecclesiastical or organizational status: Synagogue (until WWII); Funeral home (present)
- Status: Inactive (as a synagogue)

Location
- Location: 16 Ion Creangă Street, Timișoara
- Interactive map of Fabric Orthodox Synagogue
- Coordinates: 45°45′36″N 21°15′15″E

Architecture
- Type: Synagogue architecture
- Style: Eclecticism; Moorish Revival
- Groundbreaking: 1885
- Completed: 1889

Monument istoric
- Official name: Sinagoga din Fabric
- Type: Architectural
- Part of: Fabric (II) urban ensemble
- Reference no.: TM-II-m-B-06128

The Fabric Orthodox Synagogue (Romanian: Sinagoga Ortodoxă din Fabric) is a former Orthodox Jewish synagogue, located at 16 Ion Creangă Street, in the Fabric district of Timișoara, Romania. It was built between 1885 and 1889 for the Autonomous Orthodox Jewish Community. The synagogue is referred to as the "Orthodox Synagogue" to distinguish it from the New Synagogue also located in Fabric.

The building was included on the List of Historical Monuments in Timiș County, with the classification code TM-II-m-B-06128.

== History ==
In the Fabric district, there was a "German" (Ashkenazi) and a "Spanish" (Sephardic) prayer house as early as 1814.

The period during which the building served as a synagogue is associated with Chief Rabbi Herman Szofer and Francisc Friedmann, who was the president of the Orthodox community. In the years following World War II, the majority of Orthodox Jews emigrated, and today the building is used as a funeral home operated by the company Rostyl.

== Architecture ==
The synagogue was built in an eclectic style with Moorish elements, such as battlements on the cornice and pillars with rounded heads. In the courtyard there was a mikveh and a ritual slaughterhouse.
