= Fabric New Synagogue =

Former Neolog synagogue in Timişoara, Romania

Fabric Synagogue
- Sinagoga din Fabric
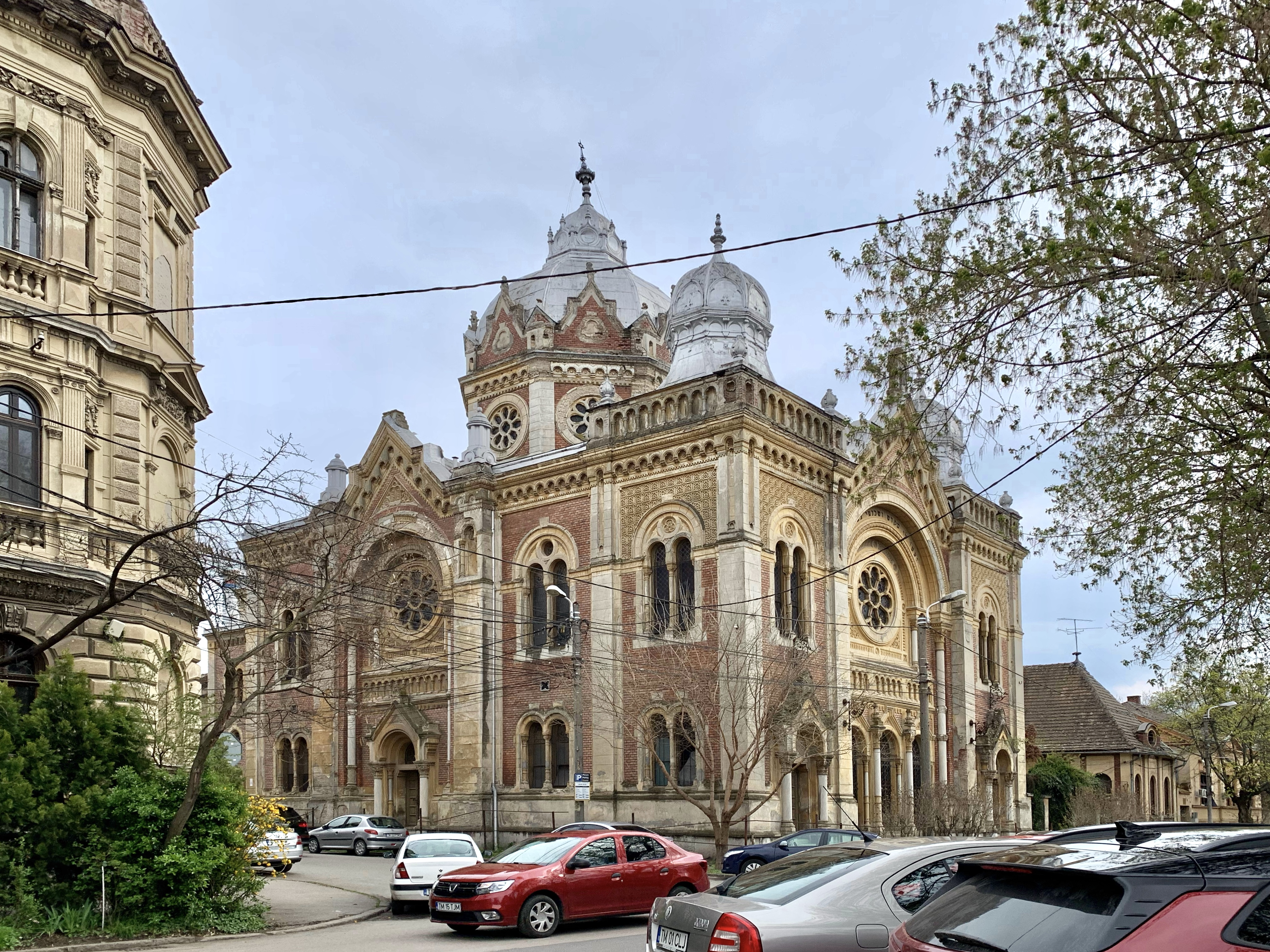
- The former synagogue façade in 2023

Religion
- Affiliation: Neolog Judaism (former)
- Rite: Nusach Ashkenaz
- Ecclesiastical or organizational status: Synagogue (1899–1985); Profane use (during WWII); Cultural center (under development)
- Status: Inactive (as a synagogue); Repurposed

Location
- Location: 2 Ion Luca Caragiale Street, Timișoara
- Interactive map of Fabric Synagogue
- Administration: Timișoara City Hall
- Coordinates: 45°45′22″N 21°14′43″E

Architecture
- Architect: Lipót Baumhorn
- Type: Synagogue architecture
- Style: Eclecticism; Gothic Revival; Moorish Revival; Renaissance Revival
- General contractor: Josef Kremer
- Established: c. 1840 (as a congregation)
- Groundbreaking: 1897
- Completed: 1899
- Construction cost: kr. 162,000

Specifications
- Capacity: 700
- Dome: 3
- Materials: Brick

Monument istoric
- Official name: Sinagogă
- Type: Architectural
- Part of: Fabric (II) urban ensemble
- Reference no.: TM-II-m-B-06126

The Fabric Synagogue (Romanian: Sinagoga din Fabric), also called the New Synagogue, is a former Neolog Jewish congregation and synagogue, located at 2 Ion Luca Caragiale Street, in the Fabric district of Timișoara, Romania. Designed by Lipót Baumhorn in an eclectic mixture of Moorish Revival, Gothic Revival and Renaissance Revival stylistic elements, the synagogue was completed in 1899.

The synagogue is included on the National Register of Historic Monuments in Romania, and, in 2022, was placed on the World Monuments Fund list of buildings deemed at particularly high risk. The New Synagogue replaced the old synagogue on Timocului Street. Not used as a synagogue since 1985, the building fell into disrepair and as of August 2024, the building was undergoing restoration by the Timișoara City Hall for use as a cultural center.

== History ==
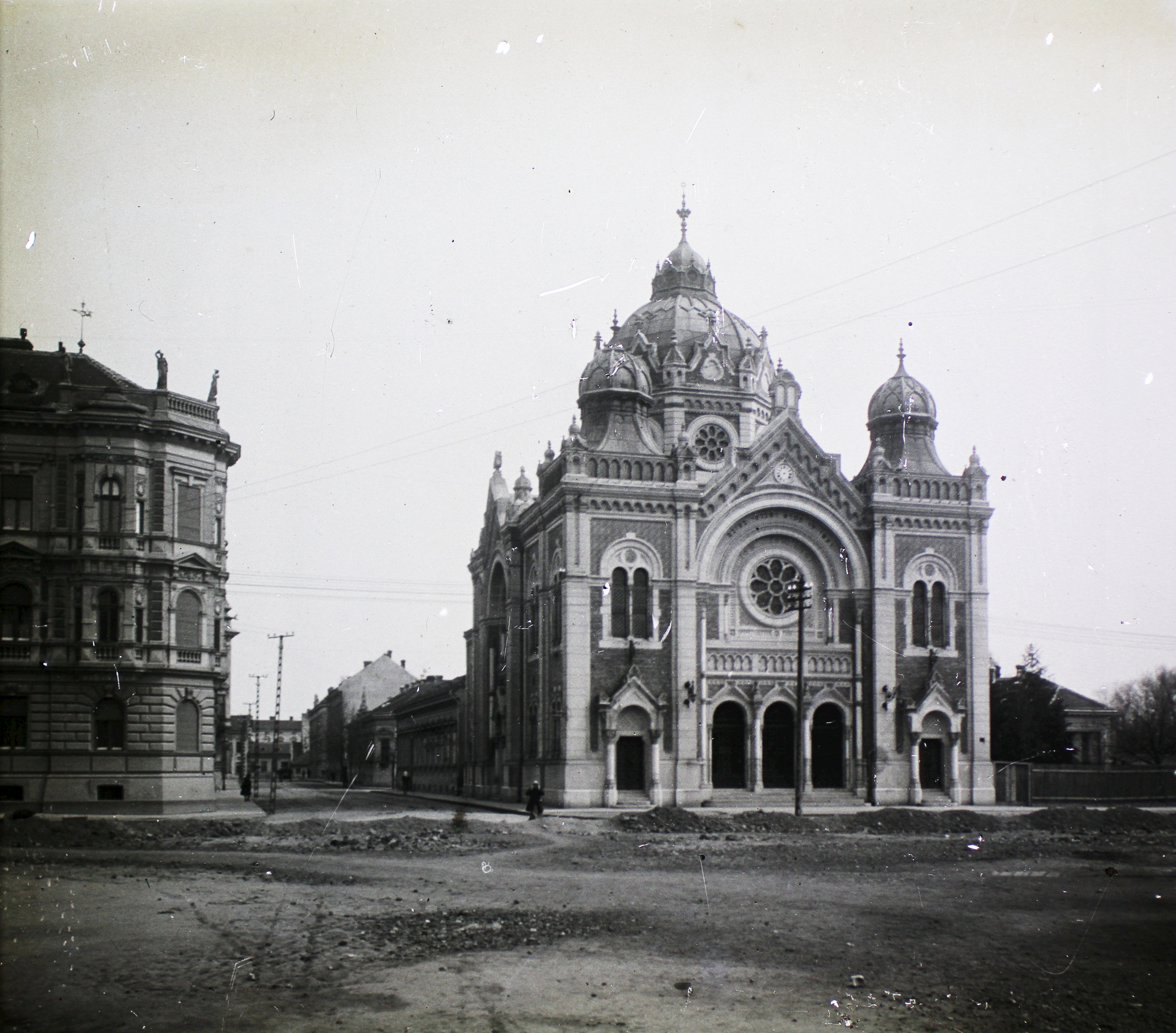
Fabric Synagogue in 1905

The year of the foundation of the first synagogue on this site is disputed. Some opinions date it to 1838, others to 1841. The temple was first opened for a Jewish community that, after 1870, joined the so-called status quo ante trend of Hungarian and Transylvanian Judaism. A dozen years later, this community became Neolog. It was located on Kunz Embankment, on the banks of the Bega Canal, next to the Archduke's House, built after 1868, and the Josef Kunz Palace (1892), which were "the symbolic monumental gateway to the Fabric district".

The Fabric Synagogue was built according to a project by the Hungarian architect Lipót Baumhorn, who designed, among other things, the Neolog synagogues in Brașov and Szeged. The new building was designed according to the tradition of the great contemporary Neolog synagogues of the Austro-Hungarian Empire, it is similar in shape to the synagogues in Rijeka, Szolnok and Zrenjanin, built according to the plans of the same architect. Delighted by the plan, the Jews of Fabric formed a temple construction committee, chaired by David Blau, a spirit maker. Sándor Kohn, the sales representative and lawyer of the brick company Kunz and Partners, and Miksa Steiner, the owner of a lye factory, also played a major role. It is interesting that part of the financing of the construction was covered by a lottery organized by the City Hall. The work was entrusted to the Timișoara entrepreneur Josef Kremer. The synagogue was inaugurated on 3 September 1899, with a sermon by Rabbi Jakab Singer, in the presence of the head of the community, Bernát Deutsch, and the mayor of Timișoara, Carol Telbisz. The organ was built by the famous Timișoara craftsman Carl Leopold Wegenstein.

During the war years, after the confiscation of the school premises, the courses of the Israelite High School continued, for a time, inside the synagogue. The synagogue fell into decay at the end of the communist period, closing in 1985 as most of the Jews left in the city after World War II emigrated to Israel. It was closed for 24 years, during which time it was vandalized several times and several valuables, such as sculptures or pieces of furniture, were stolen. In 2009, because it had no money for renovation and the synagogue was in an advanced state of decay, the Jewish Community of Timișoara ceded the synagogue for a period of 35 years to the Timișoara National Theatre, which wanted to turn it into a performance hall. The theatre company had seven years to complete the project, but due to lack of funds, it had to give up. In 2018, the synagogue was taken over by the Timișoara City Hall (for a period of 40 years), which promised to transform it into an unconventional cultural space. Since nothing has changed, the synagogue returned to the Jewish Community of Timișoara in 2020. It was taken over again by Timișoara City Hall in 2023 for maintenance, rehabilitation and restoration in order to transform it into a tourist and cultural objective.

== Architecture ==
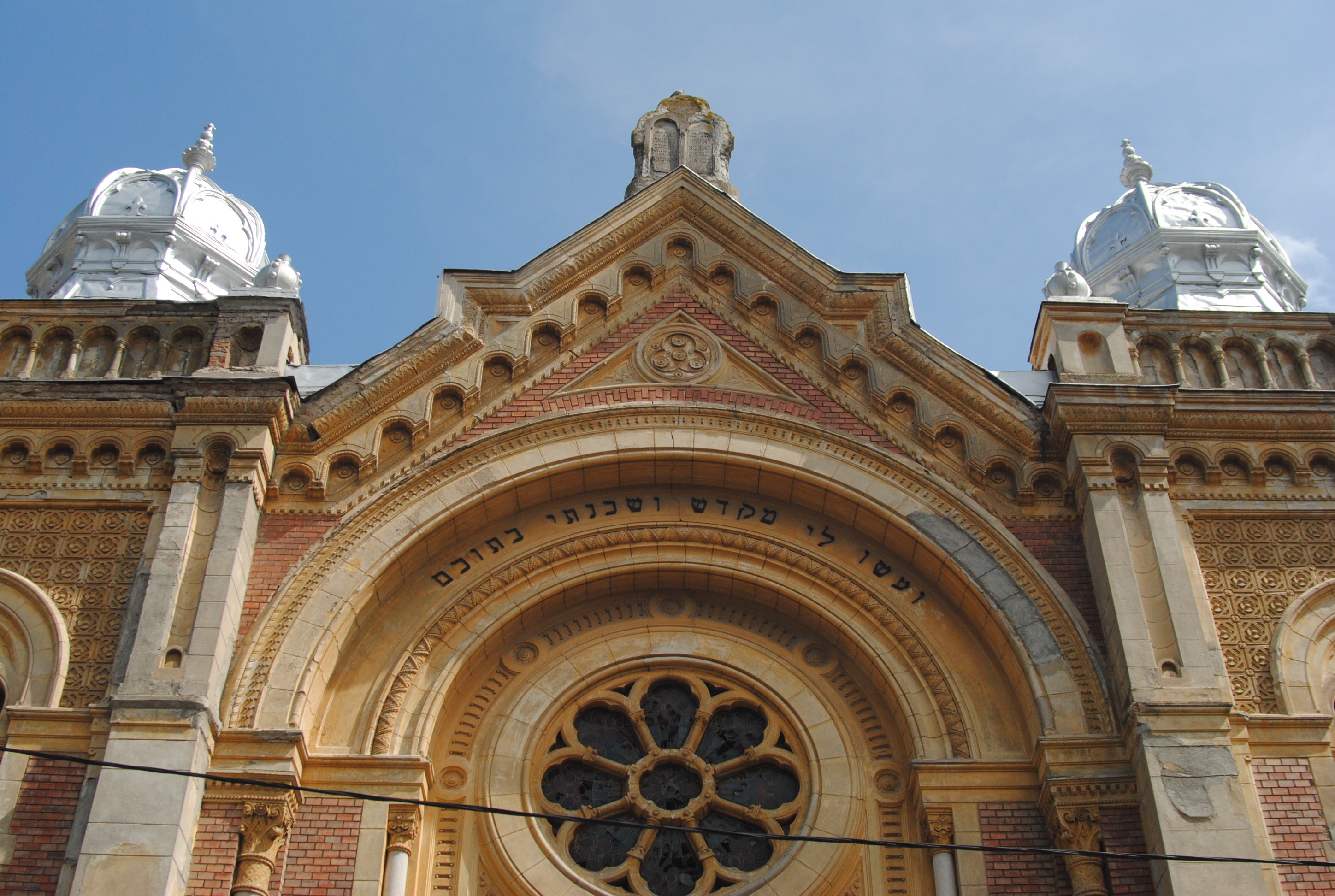
Facade detail with geometric ornament made of polychrome exposed brick

Fabric Synagogue is one of the most beautiful buildings in Timișoara, notable for its very rich decorative ensemble. Its plan is square, with a central dome that connects to the outer walls through semicircular arches. The central dome rests on an octagonal tambour, made of plastered and painted wood. The building also stands out through its small domes and towers, and on the polychrome facades the plaster alternates with the apparent red-yellow brick (Klinkersteine).

The Fabric Synagogue features neo-Moorish elements combined with Gothic and neo-Renaissance elements. The height of the building is marked by the adjoining columns, and the upper part is provided with decorative railings. The building has two entrances, one for women and one for men. The one for women is on the street, and from it one can get upstairs. An organ is also present at the first level, being built by the famous artisan Leopold Wegenstein. The men have the entrance through a vestibule (pulish), and from here they reach the room reserved for them (heichal), where there are several wooden benches.

== See also ==
- History of the Jews in Romania
- List of synagogues in Romania
