= Docomomo International =

Organization to protect and preserve modern buildings

- Founded: 1988 by Dutch architects Hubert-Jan Henket and Wessel de Jonge in Eindhoven
- Location(s): Global Delft, hosted by TU Delft, Faculty of Architecture and the Built Environment (since 2022)
- Services: Protection and conservation of Modern Architecture
- Chair: Uta Pottgiesser
- Website: www.docomomo.com

Docomomo International (sometimes written as DoCoMoMo or simply Docomomo) is a non-profit organization dedicated to documentation and conservation of buildings, sites and neighborhoods of the Modern Movement.

Mrinalini Rajagopalan, author of "Preservation and Modernity: Competing Perspectives, Contested Histories and the Question of Authenticity," described it as "the key body for the preservation of modernist architecture".

== History ==
Its foundation was inspired by the work of ICOMOS, the International Council on Monuments and Sites, established in 1965. The work of Icomos was concerned with the protection and conservation of historical buildings and sites, whereas Docomomo was founded to take up the challenge of the protection and conservation of Modern Architecture and Urbanism.

Docomomo International was founded in Eindhoven in 1988 by Dutch architects Hubert-Jan Henket and Wessel de Jonge. Henket chaired Docomomo International with de Jonge as secretary until September 2000 when the International Secretariat relocated to Paris, where it was hosted by the Cité de l’Architecture et du Patrimoine, in the Palais de Chaillot. The chair was Maristella Casciato, architect and architectural historian; with Émilie d'Orgeix, architectural historian, as secretary and Anne-Laure Guillet as director.

In 2010, the International Secretariat was relocated to Barcelona, hosted by the Fundació Mies van der Rohe. Ana Tostoes, architect and architect historian, chaired Docomomo International with Ivan Blasi, architect, as secretary. In 2014 the secretariat was transferred to the Instituto Superior Técnico at Lisbon, Portugal. Professor Tostoes remained as chair, with Zara Ferreira as secretary.

As of January 1, 2022, Docomomo International is hosted by TU Delft, Faculty of Architecture and the Built Environment. Currently, Docomomo International has chapters in over 80 countries.

== Conferences and seminars ==
Docomomo holds biennial international conferences where the people related to conservation issues gather and exchange information and studies pertaining to their scholarly research. The list of conferences held until now is as follows:

Session	Year	Date	Host city
1	1990	September 12–14	(Netherlands) Eindhoven
2	1992	September 16–19	(Germany) Bauhaus Dessau
3	1994	September 16–19	(Spain) Barcelona
4	1996	September 18–20	(Slovakia) Bratislava and Sliac
5	1998	September 16–18	(Sweden) Stockholm
6	2000	September 20–22	(Brazil) Brasília
7	2002	September 16–21	(France) Paris
8	2004	September 26 – October 2	(United States) New York City
9	2006	September 26–29	(Turkey) Istanbul and Ankara
10	2008	September 13–20	(Netherlands) Rotterdam
11	2010	August 24–27	Mexico City
12	2012	August 7–10	(Finland) Espoo
13	2014	September 24–27	(South Korea) Seoul
14	2016	September 6–9	(Portugal) Lisbon
15	2018	August 28–31	(Slovenia) Ljubljana
16	2020	September 10–14	(Japan) Tokyo
17	2022	September 6–9	(Spain) Valencia
18	2024	December 10–14	(Chile) Santiago
19	2026	March 17-22	(United States) Los Angeles

The International Scientific Committee on Technology (ISC/T) organizes seminars covering the following themes: restoration of reinforced concrete structures, curtain-wall facades, windows and glass, wood and the modern movement, colours in modern architecture and stone in modern buildings.

Seminars and conferences are often held in key modernist buildings, as for instance at Alvar Aalto’s Vyborg Library (2003 ISC/T seminar), Brinkman and Leendert van der Vlugt's Van Nelle factory in Rotterdam (2008 Conference), and Gordon Bunshaft's Lever House in New York (closing party at 2004 Conference).

== Publications ==
The docomomo Journal is an international periodical that, since 1990, regularly summarizes recent research on the sites and buildings of Modern Movement. It is a bi-annual publication featuring articles by noted architecture practitioners and scholars, addressing all facets of Modern Movement architecture, from history and design concepts to conservation, technology or education.

ISSUE	TITLE	YEAR
1	Newsletter 1	August 1989
2	Newsletter 2	January 1990
3	Newsletter 3	June 1990
4	Newsletter 4	March 1991
5	Newsletter 5	June 1991
6	Newsletter 6	November 1991
7	Newsletter 7	June 1992
8	Newsletter 8	January 1993
9	Technology	July 1993
10		November 1993
11	North America	June 1994
12	Metal	November 1994
13	Latin America	June 1995
14	The Image of Modernity	November 1995
15	Curtain Wall Refurbishment	July 1996
16	Urbanism, Gardens & Landscape	March 1997
17	Exposed Concrete	September 1997
18		February 1998
19	Nordic Countries	July 1998
20	Windows to the Future Anniversary Issue – 10 Years Docomomo	January 1999
21		June 1999
22	Modern Houses	May 2000
23	The Modern City Facing the Future	August 2000
24		February 2001
25		July 2001
26	Engineering the Future	December 2001
27	The History of Docomomo	June 2002
28	Modern Heritage in Africa	March 2003
29	Modernism in Asia Pacific	September 2003
30	2003 A Year of Docomomo Activities	March 2004
31	Modernism in the US after World War II	September 2004
32	New Frames	March 2005
33	The Modern Movement in the Caribbean Islands	September 2005
34	France-Brazil Round Trip	March 2006
35	Modern Architecture in the Middle East	September 2006
36	Other Modernisms: A Selection from the Docomomo Registers	March 2007
37	Places of Modernism	September 2007
38	Canada Modern	March 2008
39	Postwar Mass Housing	September 2008
40	Tel Aviv 100 Years	March 2009
41	Nine Favorite Architects	September 2009
42	Art and Architecture	Summer 2010
43	Brasilia 1960–2010	2010/2
44	Modern and Sustainable	2011/1
45	Bridges and Infrastructure	2011/2
46	Designing Modern Life	2012/1
47	Global Design	2012/2
48	Modern Africa, Tropical Architecture	2013/1
49	For an Architect's Training	2013/2
50	High Density	2014/1
51	Modern Housing. Patrimonio Vivo	2014/2
52	Reuse, Renovation and Restoration	2015/1
53	LC 50 Years After	2015/2
54	Housing Reloaded	2016/1
55	Modern Lisbon	2016/2
56	The Heritage of Mies	2017/1
56	The Heritage of Mies – SECOND EDITION	2019/1
57	Modern Southeast Asia	2017/2
58	Louis I. Kahn. The Permanence	2018/1
59	An Eastern Europe Vision	2018/2
60	Architectures of the Sun	2019/1
61	Education and Reuse	2019/2
62	Cure and Care	2020/1
63	Tropical Architecture in the Modern Diaspora	2020/2
64	Modern Houses	2021/1
65	Housing for All	2021/2
66	Modern Plastic Heritage	2022/1
67	Multiple Modernities in Ukraine	2022/2

== Work at national level ==
Many countries have national Docomomo working parties, as either part of academic establishments or architecture federations. They may define gazetteers of important structures to be protected, such as DoCoMoMo Key Scottish Monuments and DoCoMoMo Architectural Masterpieces of Finnish Modernism, or support local campaigners.

Preservation work by Docomomo together with others was recognised by the New Jersey Department of Environmental Protection after a 2009 charrette to protect the former Bell Labs Holmdel Complex.

== See also ==
- World Crafts Council – International non-governmental organization
- World Design Organization – International association
