= World Monuments Fund =

U.S. non-profit organization

- Founded: 1965; 61 years ago
- Founder: James A. Gray (1909–1994)
- Type: Arts and Culture
- Tax ID no.: 13-2571900
- Purpose: Architectural conservation, historic preservation, archaeology, cultural heritage management
- Location(s): Rockefeller Center; New York, New York
- Region served: Global
- Method: Fieldwork, advocacy, grantmaking, education, training
- Key people: Bénédicte de Montlaur, Chief Executive Officer
- Revenue: $16.3 million (2010)
- Website: www.wmf.org
- Formerly called: International Fund for Monuments (1965–1984)
- WMF has affiliates in Cambodia, Peru, France, Spain, Portugal, and the United Kingdom

World Monuments Fund (WMF) is a private, international, non-profit organization dedicated to the preservation of historic architecture and cultural heritage sites around the world through fieldwork, advocacy, grantmaking, education, and training.

Founded in 1965, WMF is headquartered in New York, and has offices and affiliates around the world, including Cambodia, France, Peru, Portugal, Spain, and the United Kingdom. In addition to hands-on management, the affiliates identify, develop, and manage projects, negotiate local partnerships, and attract local support to complement funds provided by donors.

== History ==
=== International Fund for Monuments (1965–1984) ===
The International Fund for Monuments (IFM) was an organization created by Colonel James A. Gray (1909–1994) after his retirement from the U.S. Army in 1960. Gray had conceived of a visionary project to arrest the settlement of the Leaning Tower of Pisa by freezing the soil underneath, and he formed the organization in 1965 as a vehicle for the implementation of this idea. Even though this project did not materialize, an opportunity arose for the young organization to participate in the conservation of the rock-hewn churches of Lalibela in Ethiopia. In 1966 Gray secured the support of philanthropist Lila Acheson Wallace (1889–1984), who offered $150,000 to the International Fund for Monuments and UNESCO (the United Nations Educational, Scientific and Cultural Organization) for this project. The project continued until the Communist overthrow of Haile Selassie I and the subsequent expulsion of foreigners from Ethiopia. After Ethiopia, Gray's interests shifted to Easter Island (Rapa Nui) off the coast of Chile. Gray formed the "Easter Island Committee", with Norwegian ethnographer and adventurer Thor Heyerdahl (1914–2002) as its honorary chairman. Gray arranged to have one of the monolithic human figures known as moai exhibited in the United States. With the help of anthropologist William Mulloy (1917–1978), Gray selected an 8-foot-tall (2.4 m), five-ton head, which was exhibited in front of the Seagram Building in New York and in the Pan American Union Building in Washington, D.C.

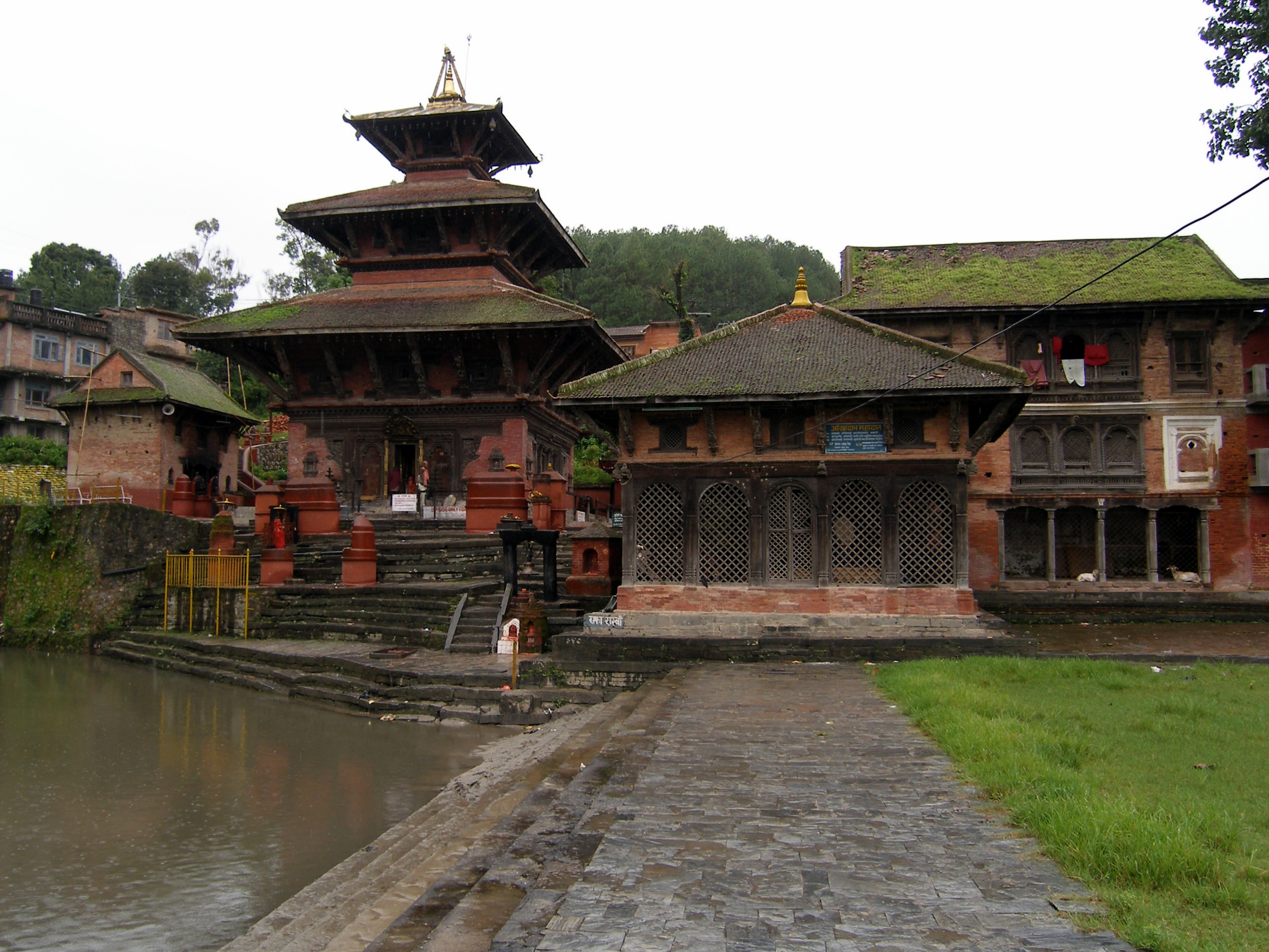
The Mahadev Temple in Gokarna, Nepal, a conservation project of the International Fund for Monuments

An important chapter for the organization started with its involvement in the broad international effort led by UNESCO for the protection of the city of Venice, Italy from catastrophic flooding. After the extremely high tide of 4 November 1966, the city, including the historic Piazza San Marco, was inundated for more than 24 hours. The International Fund for Monuments set up a "Venice Committee", with Professor John McAndrew (1904–1978) of Wellesley College as chairman and Gray as executive secretary. On the part of the committee, appeals were made to the American public, and local chapters set up in American cities. This early initiative led to the formation of the independent organization Save Venice in 1971. These efforts helped establish a reputation for IFM. In Spain, the organization formed a Committee for Spain under the leadership of American diplomat and U.S. Ambassador to Spain in 1965–1967 Angier Biddle Duke (1915–1995).

At the invitation of UNESCO in the 1970s, IFM became involved in architectural conservation in Nepal, where the organization adopted the Mahadev temple complex in Gokarna, in Nepal's Kathmandu Valley. The 14th-century temple building was surveyed, rotten timbers were replaced, and the foundations were strengthened. Sculpted wooden architectural elements were painstakingly cleaned of layers of a motor oil coating that had been applied annually for protection.

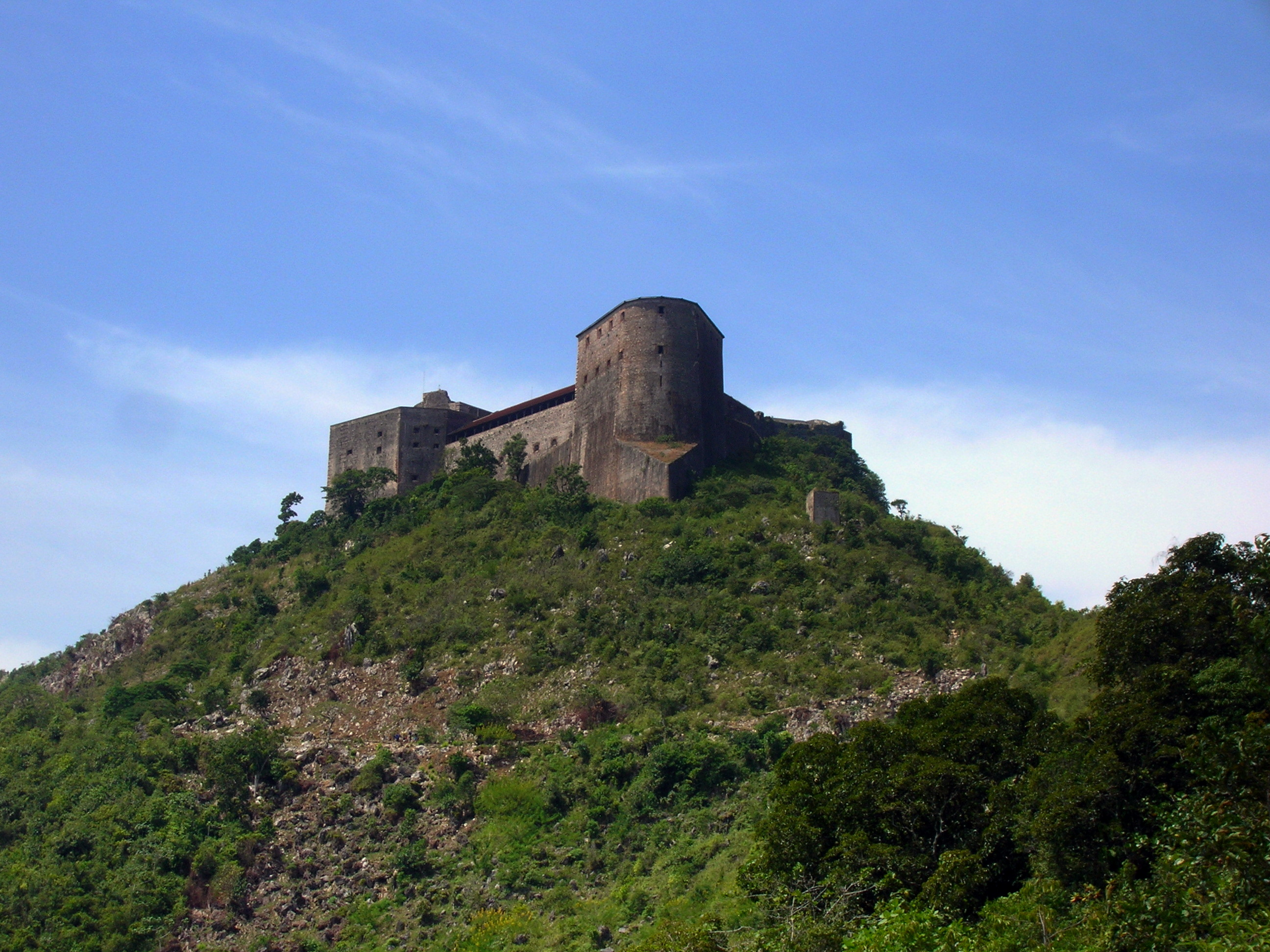
Aerial view of the Citadelle Laferrière, in northern Haiti, a conservation project of the World Monuments Fund (1985–1987)

Also at the request of UNESCO, IFM launched a project for the preservation of the Citadelle Laferrière, a large mountaintop fortress near Milot, Haiti. The site was the keystone of a defensive system constructed in the early period of Haitian independence to protect the young state from French attempts to reclaim it as a colony. Local artisans reconstructed wooden and tile roofs over the grand gallery and batteries using traditional carpentry methods, and consolidated the stone galleries of the fortress. IFM also sponsored a traveling exhibition and a film about the history of the Citadelle, which was used for educational purposes in the United States.

== Programs ==
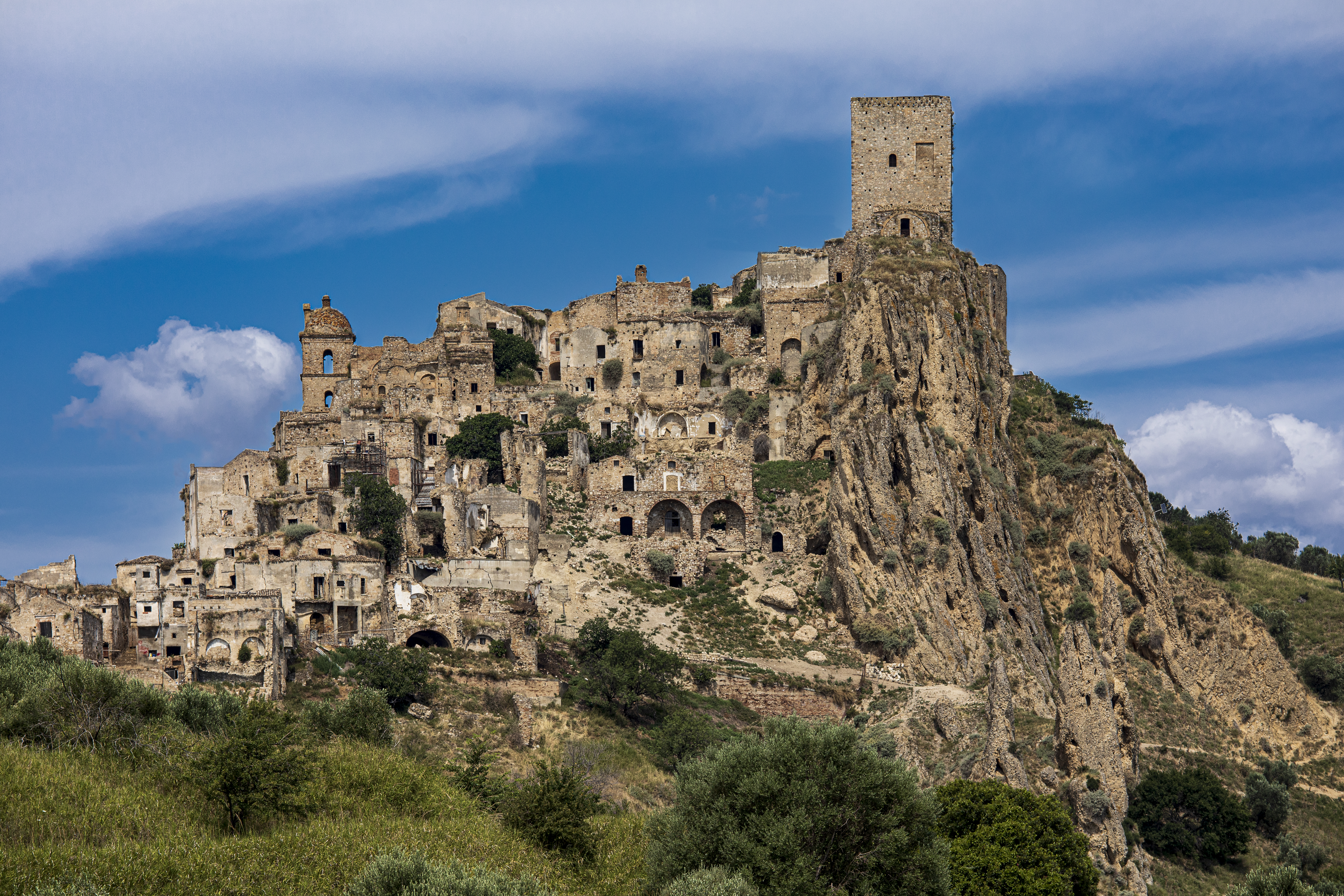
The ghost town of Craco, Italy, a conservation project of the World Monuments Fund (2010)

Through donations and matching funds, WMF has worked with local community and government partners worldwide to safeguard and conserve places of historic value for future generations. To date, WMF has worked at more than 500 sites in 91 countries, including many UNESCO World Heritage Sites. WMF has worked at internationally famous tourist attractions, as well as lesser-known sites.

Among highly prominent projects, starting in 1990, are many temples at Angkor, Cambodia, including Preah Khan and Phnom Bakheng; the Château de Chantilly in Chantilly, France; the ghost town of Craco, Italy; many structures in Rome, including the Temple of Hercules, Santa Maria Antiqua, and the House of Augustus; several sites on Easter Island; various sites at ancient Luxor in Egypt; Lalibela in Ethiopia; San Ignacio Miní in Argentina; the ancient Maya city of Naranjo, Guatemala; the Segovia Aqueduct in Segovia, Spain; as well as 25 projects in Venice, Italy, over 20 years. WMF has also participated in projects in the United States, including Ellis Island, Taos Pueblo, Mesa Verde National Park, the Mount Lebanon Shaker Society, and many sites in New Orleans and the Gulf Coast.

=== World Monuments Watch ===
Every two years WMF publishes the World Monuments Watch (formerly the World Monuments Watch List of 100 Most Endangered Sites). Since the first list was compiled in 1996, this program has drawn international attention to cultural heritage sites around the world, connecting local heritage preservation to global awareness and action. It was initially conceived as a "red list" of endangered sites threatened by challenges such as neglect, vandalism, armed conflict, commercial development, natural disasters, and climate change. The Watch has since evolved as a tool to catalyze local and international action for the preservation of sites and connect site stewards to technical and financial support. A detailed list of each event is available in the corresponding year: 1996, 1998, 2000, 2002, 2004, 2006, 2008, 2010, 2012, 2014, 2016, 2018, 2020, 2022 and 2025.

During the biennial open call for nominations, sites are nominated by international and local preservation groups and professionals, local authorities, community activists, and more. Sites of all types, including secular and religious architecture, archaeological sites, landscapes and townscapes, and dating from all time periods, from ancient to contemporary, are eligible. Following a rigorous review process by WMF staff as well as external volunteer practitioners, an independent panel of international heritage experts reviews a shortlist and selects the sites that make up the final list.

=== Special initiatives ===
WMF also operates a number of special initiatives that transcend individual projects at specific sites and address broader themes in heritage preservation.

This video details WMF's site management plan for Babylon, a blueprint for working on the site today as well as planning for the future.

==== Iraq's cultural heritage ====
Following the Iraq War, WMF created the Iraq Cultural Heritage Conservation Initiative to address the many threats to Iraq's cultural heritage resulting from the occupation and from a long period of political isolation and conflict. At the ancient city of Babylon, WMF has launched a program with the support of the United States Department of State to develop a comprehensive site management plan, help local officials prepare a nomination for World Heritage listing, and establish site boundaries for the long-term protection of the ancient city.

==== Modernism at Risk ====
In 2006, with the support of the Knoll furniture company, WMF launched "Modernism at Risk", an advocacy and conservation program for Modernist architecture. Through this initiative, the biennial World Monuments Fund / Knoll Modernism Prize was established in 2008. The inaugural prize was awarded to Brenne Gesellschaft von Architekten for the restoration of the former ADGB Trade Union School in Germany, which was inscribed as part of the Bauhaus World Heritage Site in July 2017.

===== Recipients of the World Monuments Fund / Knoll Modernism Prize =====
- 2008: Brenne Gesellschaft von Architekten mbH for the restoration of the former ADGB Trade Union School in Bernau bei Berlin, Germany.
- 2010: Bierman Henket Architecten and Wessel de Jonge Architecten for the restoration of the Zonnestraal Sanatorium in Hilversum, the Netherlands.
- 2012: Architectural Consortium for Hizuchi Elementary School for the restoration of Hizuchi Elementary School in Hizuchi, Yawatahama, Ehime, Japan.
- 2014: Finnish Committee for the Restoration of Viipuri Library with the Central City Alvar Aalto Library for the restoration of the Viipuri Library in Vyborg, Russia.
- 2016 Molenaar & Co. architecten, Hebly Theunissen architecten, and Michael van Gessel landscapes for the rehabilitation of the Justus van Effencomplex in Rotterdam, the Netherlands.
- 2018 Agence Christiane Schmuckle-Mollard for the restoration of the Karl Marx School, Villejuif, France.
- 2026 Architectus Conrad Gargett for the restoration of the Africa Hall, Addis Ababa, Ethiopia.

==== Recipients of the Hadrian Award ====
Each year, the World Monuments Fund's Hadrian Gala honours "Champions of Conservation" for their passionate commitment and extraordinary contributions to preserving and protecting the world's shared cultural heritage.

- 1988: Carlo De Benedetti
- 1989: Paul Mellon
- 1990: His Royal Highness The Prince of Wales
- 1991: Brooke Astor
- 1992: Marella and Gianni Agnelli
- 1993: Dominique de Menil
- 1994: David Rockefeller
- 1995: Jacob Rothschild, 4th Baron Rothschild
- 1996: His Highness The Aga Khan IV
- 1997: Phyllis Lambert
- 1998: Richard Hampton Jenrette
- 1999: The Sainsbury Brothers – Tim Sainsbury, John Sainsbury, Simon Sainsbury
- 2000: Harvey Golub
- 2001: James Wolfensohn
- 2002: Hélène and Michel David-Weill
- 2003: Eugene V. Thaw
- 2004: Carlos Slim
- 2005: John Julius Cooper, 2nd Viscount Norwich
- 2006: His Highness Gajsingh, The Maharaja of Jodhpur
- 2007: Rahmi Koç, Semahat Arsel, Suna Kiraç, and the Koç family
- 2008: Houghton, Doreen, and Graeme Freeman and the Freeman Foundation
- 2009: David Rockefeller, Jr. (Video)
- 2010: Ratan Naval Tata and the Tata family (Video)
- 2011: Ronald and Jo Carole Lauder
- 2012: Kenneth Chenault
- 2013: Roberto Hernández Ramírez
- 2014: Ellsworth Kelly and Mica Ertegün
- 2015: Her Majesty Queen Sofía
- 2016: Tomas Maier and the Stavros Niarchos Foundation
- 2017: Deborah Lehr and Frank Stella
- 2018: Prince Amyn Aga Khan and Dr. Eusebio Leal Spengler
- 2019: Thomas Kaplan

== Partners ==
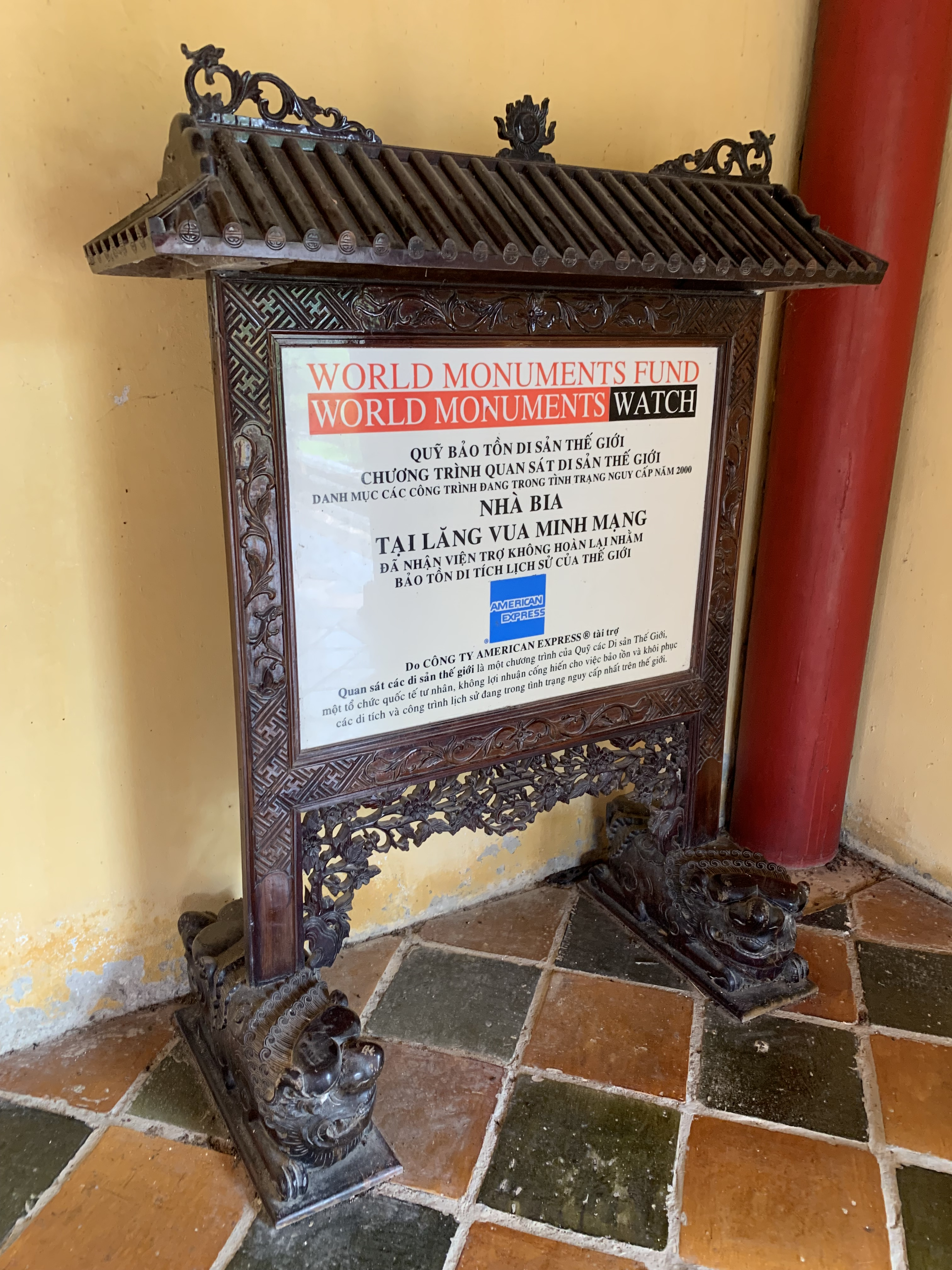
A sign noting WMF and American Express at the Tomb of Emperor Minh Mạng in Huế, Vietnam

Some of WMF's long-term partners have included American Express, Knoll, the Robert W. Wilson Challenge to Conserve Our Heritage, the Samuel H. Kress Foundation, and Tiffany & Co. The Samuel H. Kress Foundation's relationship with the organization dates almost to the inception of the International Fund for Monuments.

In 2009, WMF agreed to share approximately 2,000 images of architecture, sites, and monuments from around the world to be made available by Artstor.

WMF has partnered with Williamsburg High School for Architecture and Design, the only high school in the United States with a four-year comprehensive historic preservation curriculum.

In May 2022, WMF announced a collaboration of digital work for the 2024 reopening of the Metropolitan Museum of Art's African, ancient American, and Oceanic art galleries. The digital project "aims to bolster the understanding of several historic sites in sub-Saharan Africa", in particular sites that have been minimally explored by Western museums.

== Strategic Affiliation with Global Heritage Fund ==
In 2023, World Monuments Fund and Global Heritage Fund announced a Strategic Affiliation. The affiliation aims to create a more resilient, inclusive, and sustainable future for cultural heritage protection worldwide. WMF added GHF's two active projects, Dali Village in Guizhou, China, and Ciudad Perdida in Colombia, to the WMF project portfolio.
