= Adolf Rading =

German architect

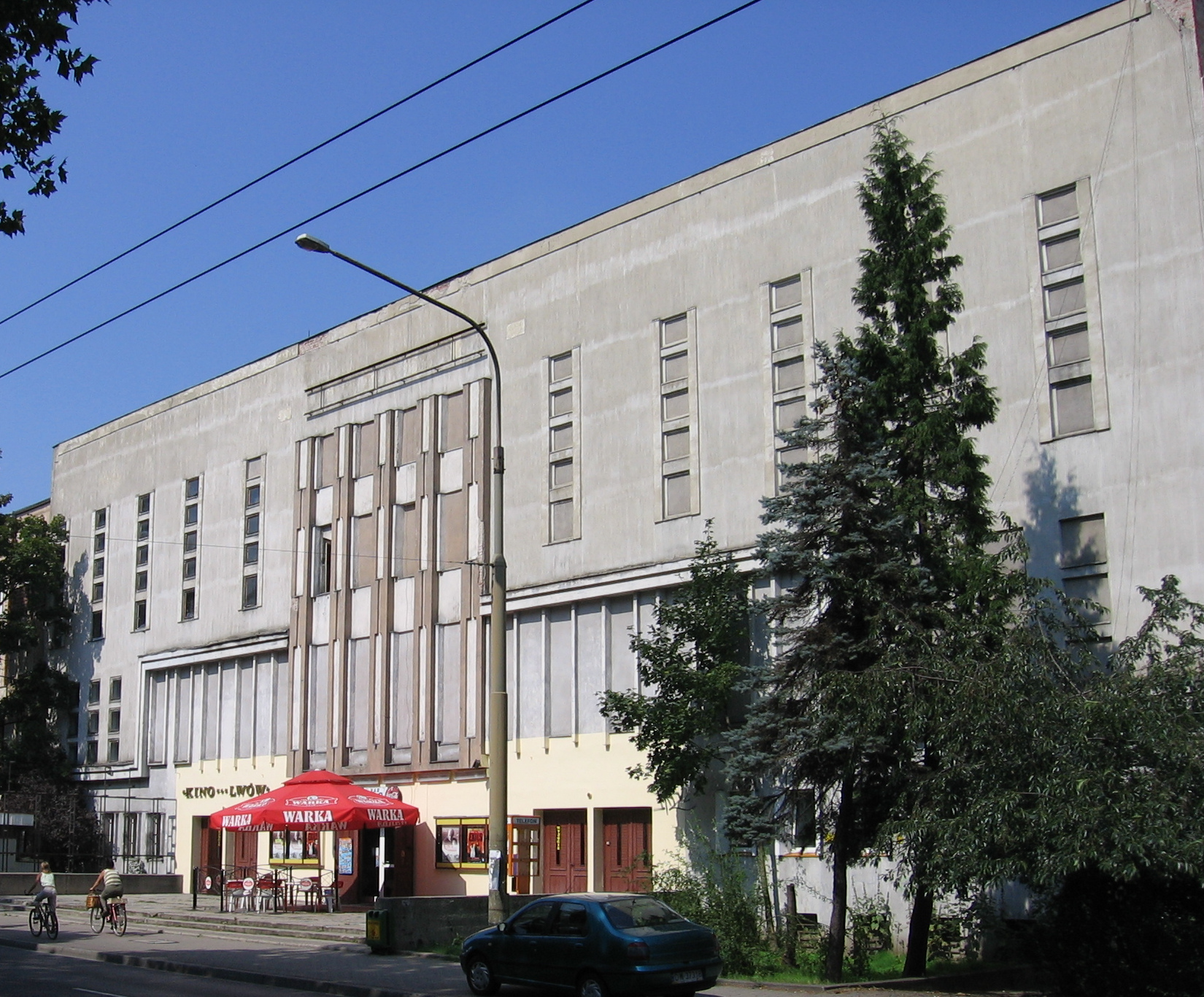
- Adolf Rading's Odd Fellows Lodge in Wrocław, Poland
- Born: February 2, 1888; Berlin, Kingdom of Prussia, German Empire
- Died: April 4, 1957 (aged 69); London, England
- Occupation: architect of the Neues Bauen period

Adolf Peter Rading (2 February 1888, in Berlin – 4 April 1957, in London) was a German architect of the Neues Bauen period, also active in Palestine and Great Britain.

== Career ==
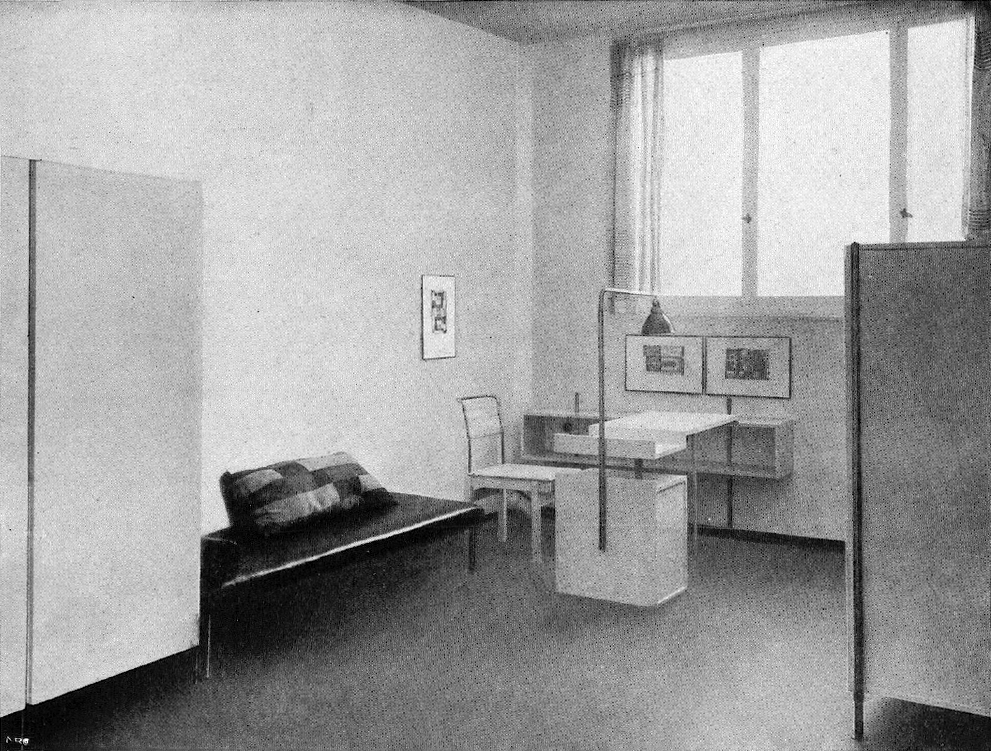
Four-storey rental house, WUWA (interior)

After finishing architecture school in Berlin, Rading briefly worked in the office of Peter Behrens in 1919. That same year he moved to Breslau, becoming a professor at the State Academy for Arts and Crafts. In 1926 Rading established a partnership with Hans Scharoun, became a member of The Ring (the architectural collective), and in 1927 contributed a single-family house to the Weissenhof Estate exhibition.

After the Nazis came to power in 1933, Rading, whose wife came from a Jewish family, emigrated to France and then to Palestine, in today's Israel. From 1943 through 1950 Rading served as the city architect of Haifa; in 1950 he established himself in Great Britain.
