= Großsiedlung Siemensstadt =

Coordinates: 52°32′18″N 13°16′48″E

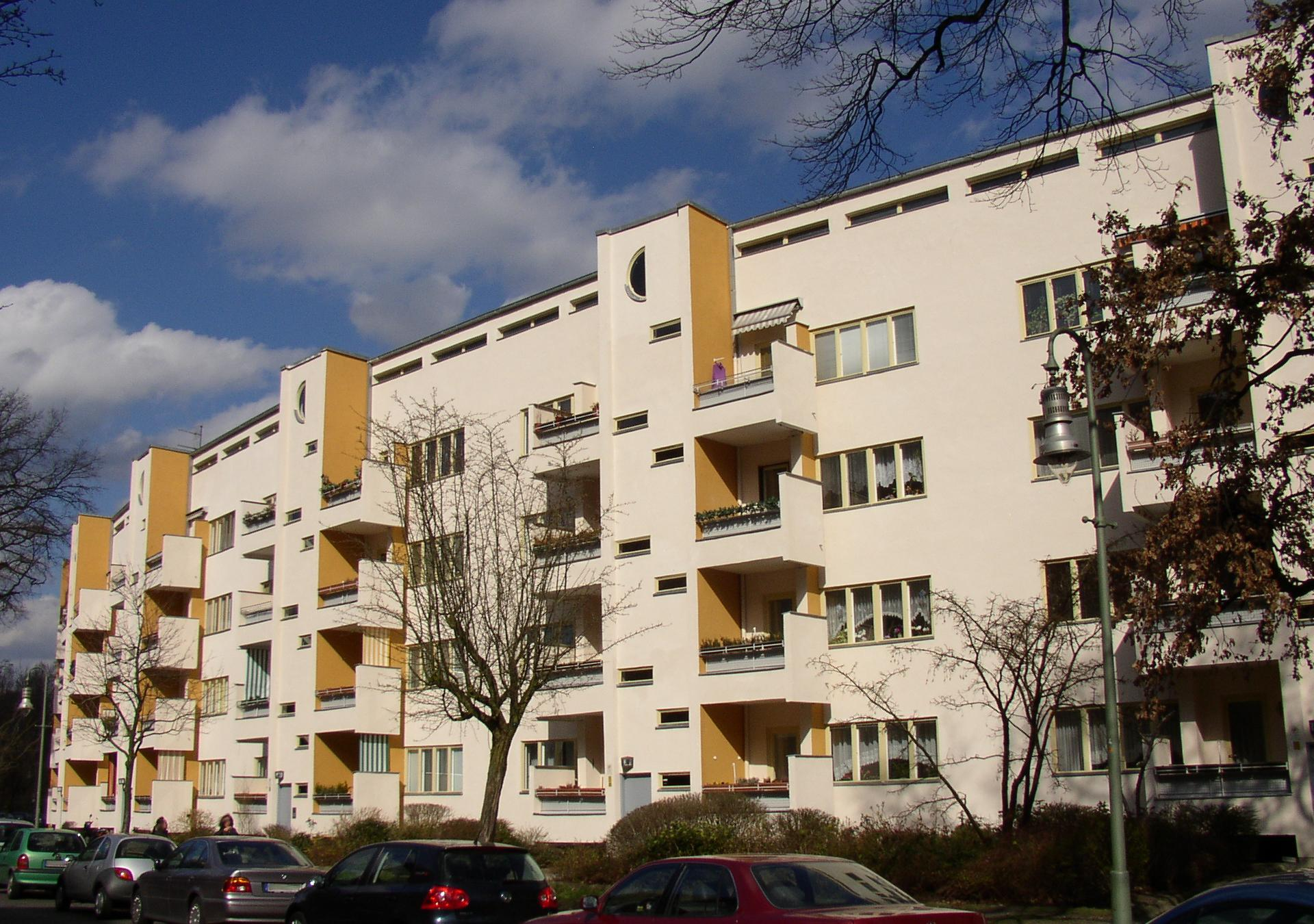
Maeckeritzstrasse Building, Hans Scharoun

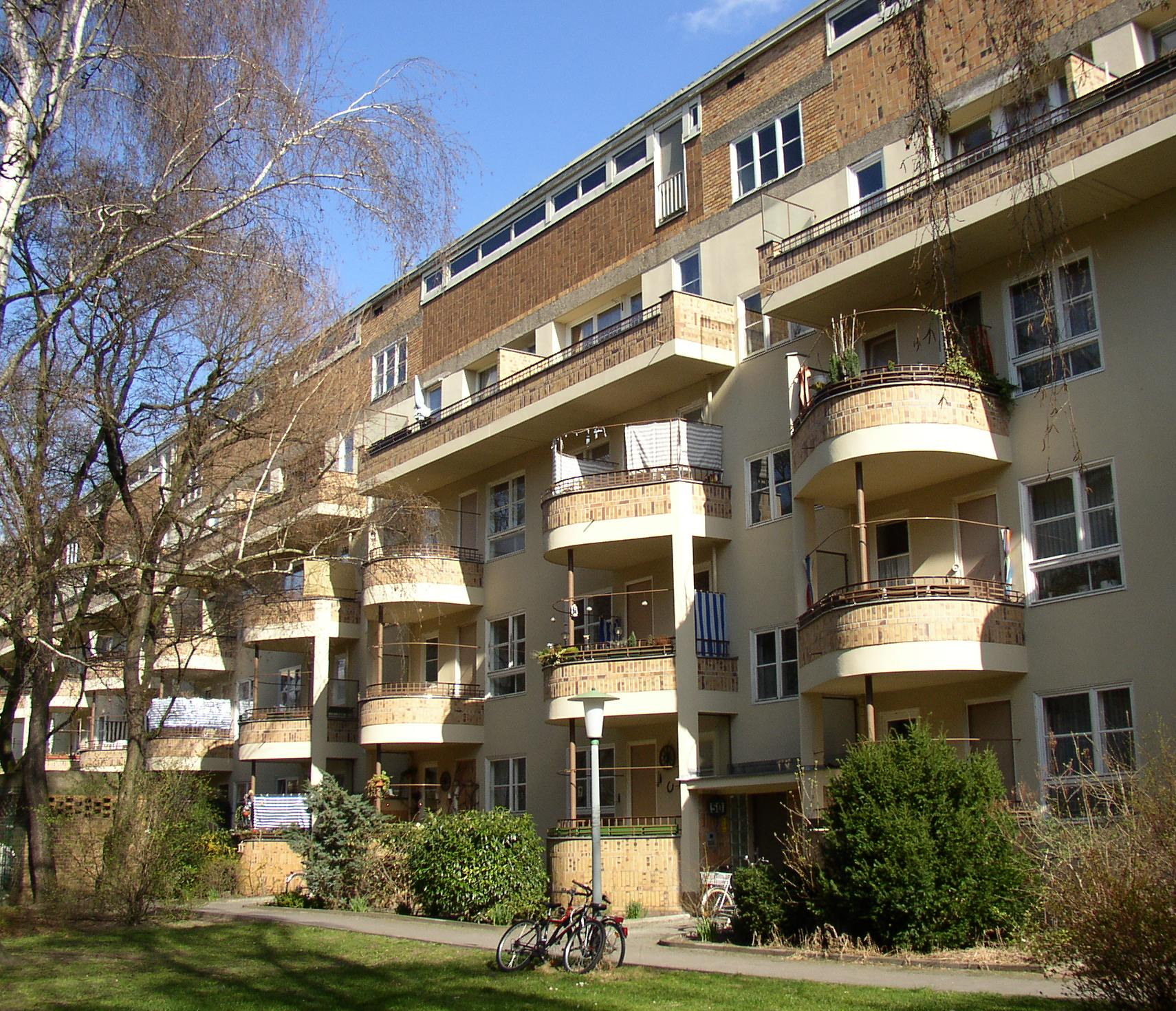
In der Goebelstraße by Hugo Häring

The Siemensstadt Settlement (German: Großsiedlung Siemensstadt; also known as Ring Settlement or Ringsiedlung) is a nonprofit residential community in the Charlottenburg-Wilmersdorf district of Berlin. It is one of the six Modernist Housing Estates in Berlin recognized in July 2008 by UNESCO as a World Heritage Site because of their outstanding modernist architecture and contribution to the progressive housing reform movement during the Weimar Republic.

== Geography ==
Despite its name, the larger part of the estate is situated within the locality (Ortsteil) of Charlottenburg-Nord; only the smaller westernmost part belongs to Siemensstadt in the district of Spandau.

== History ==
It was built between 1929 and 1931, under the overall master plan of German architect Hans Scharoun. Six prominent Weimar-era architects took part: Hans Scharoun, Fred Forbát, Otto Bartning, Walter Gropius, Paul Rudolph Henning, and Hugo Häring. The nickname Ringsiedlung came from the association of some of these architects with Der Ring collective.

The open spaces were designed by the German modernist landscape architect Leberecht Migge.

Unlike the other significant public housing projects of the time, which were produced under government cooperative Gehag sponsorship, the Siemensstadt was constructed by a private housing cooperative as worker housing for Siemens' nearby electrical factory, which employed 60,000 workers.

The shape of the settlement marked a turning point in urban thinking, the point at which Berlin's city planner Martin Wagner abandoned a low-rise, garden city-style project with individual gardens, in favor of much denser multi-story apartment blocks.

== Special offers ==
Distributed within the whole settlement are information columns that give short, concise information on the architects and his buildings (currently in German language only).

== Gallery ==
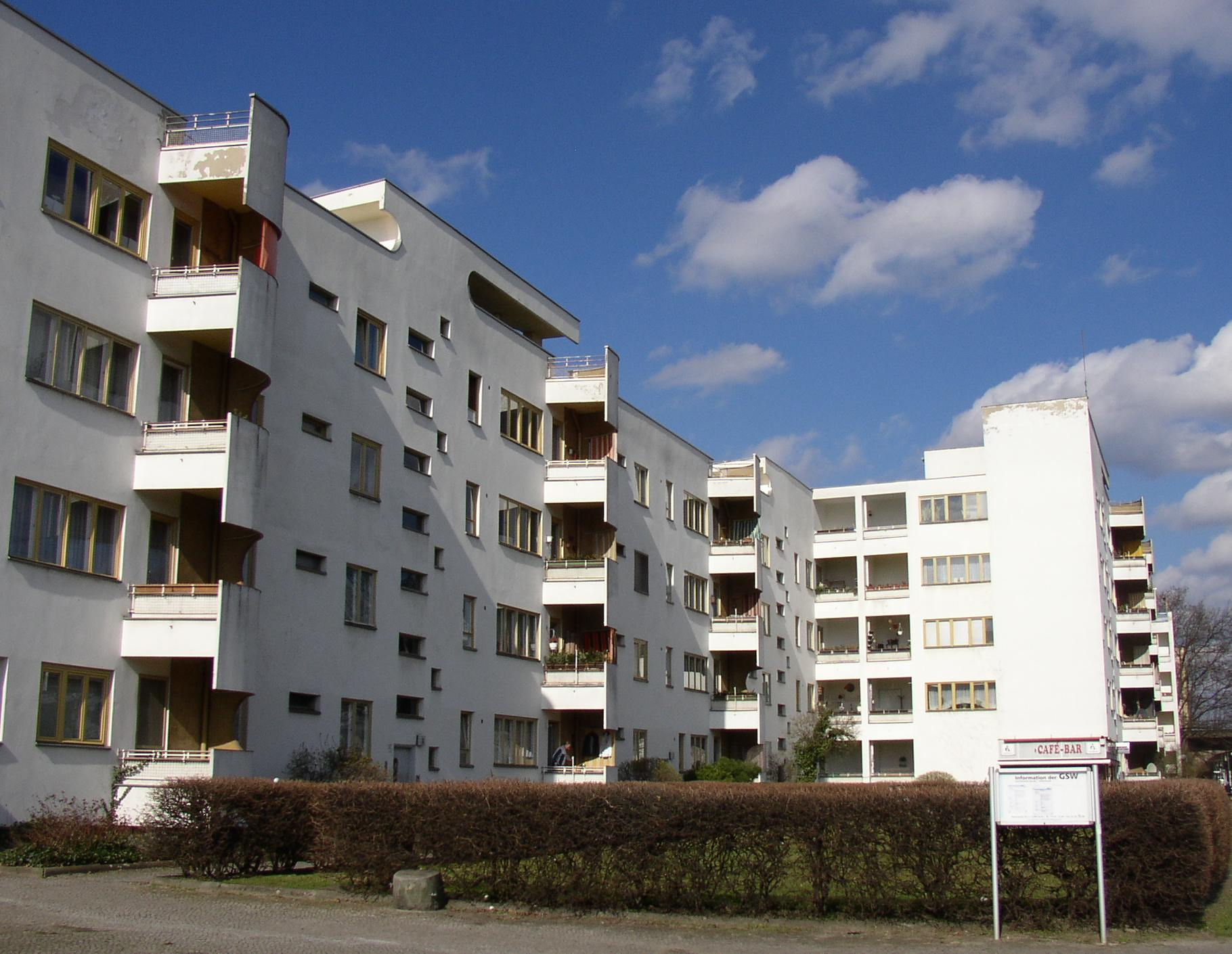
"Panzerkreuzer (armoured ship)" by Hans Scharoun

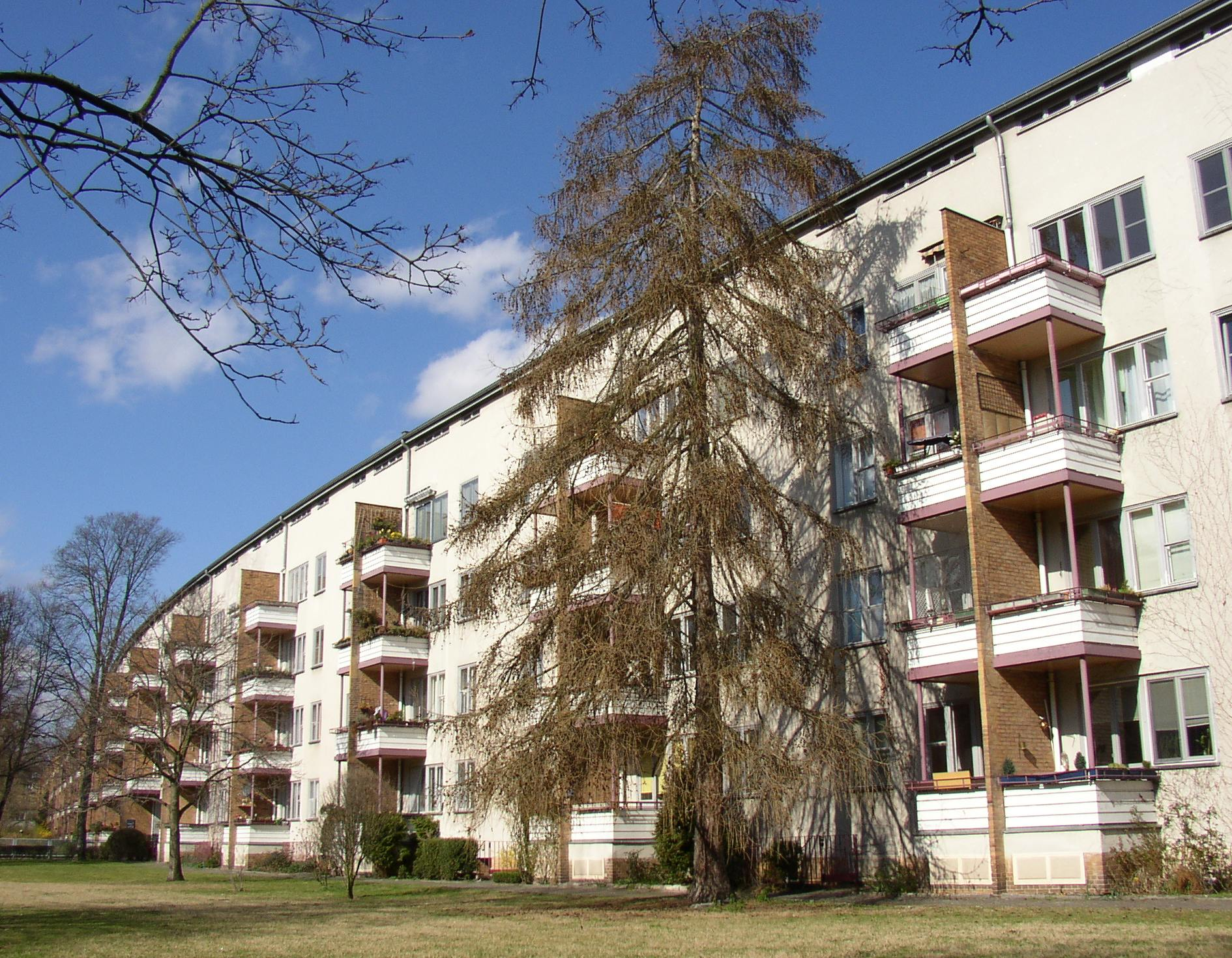
„Langer Jammer (Long Misery)“
by Otto Bartning

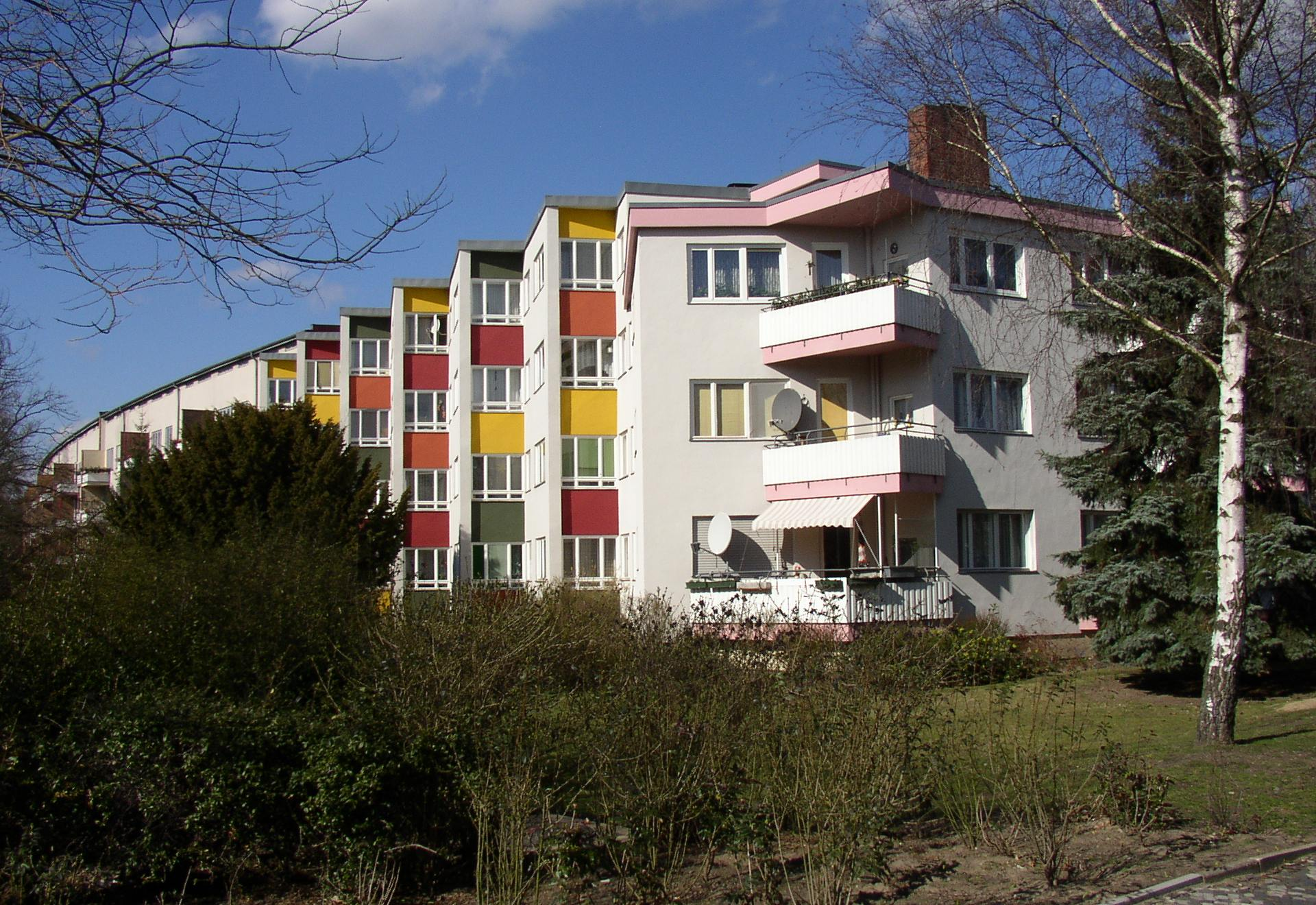
Postwar eastern termination (1956)
by Hans Scharoun

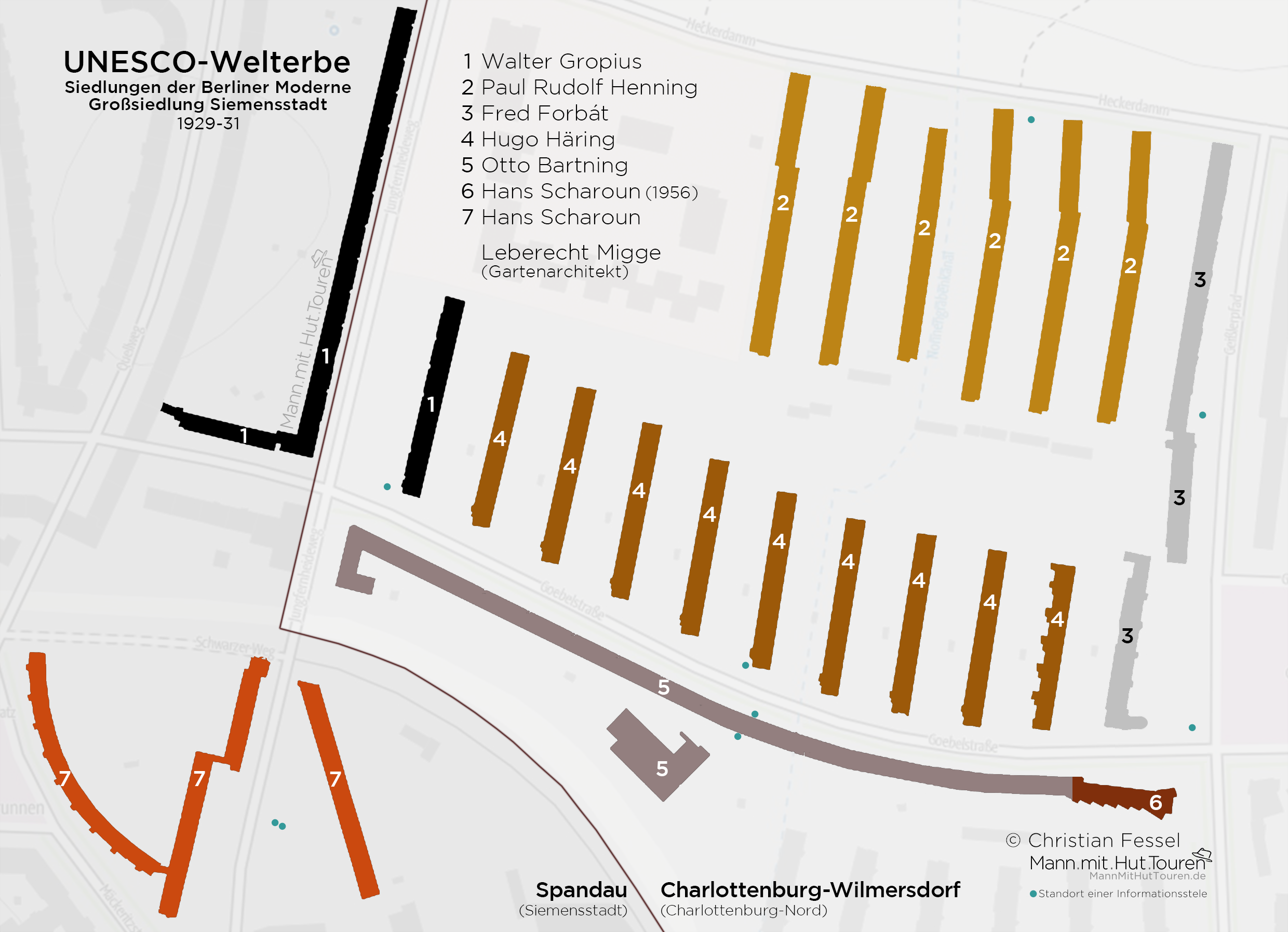
Site of the UNESCO World Heritage site

== See also ==
- Siemensstadt
- Gropiusstadt
