= WuWA =

1929 architecture exhibition

Coordinates: 51°06′18″N 17°05′06″E

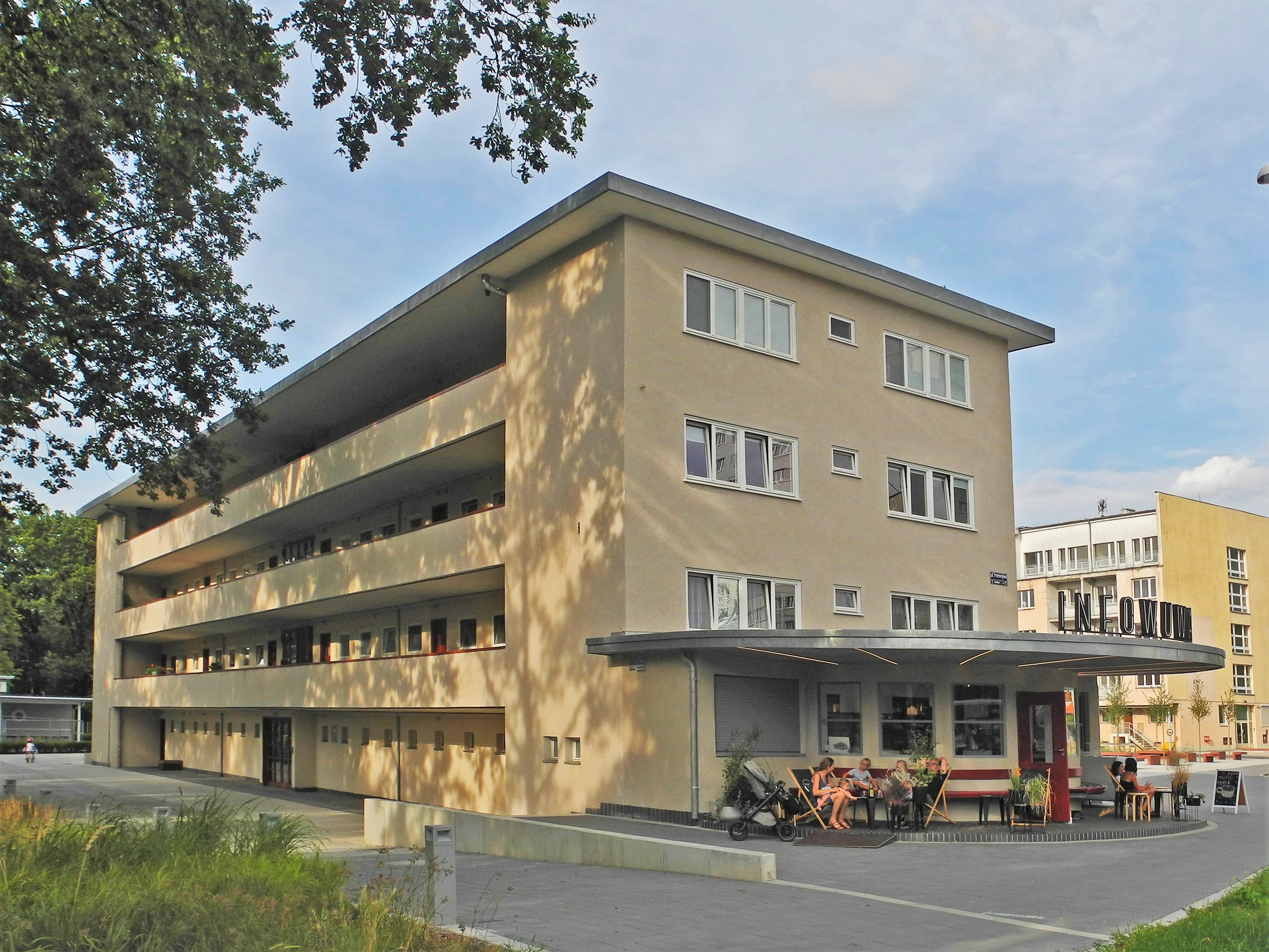
House close to the pergola (2 Tramwajowa Street). As of 2018, it has been refurbished as an info centre and café called INFOWUWA, and is a vibrant meeting place for local Wrocławians.

WuWA map (in Polish)

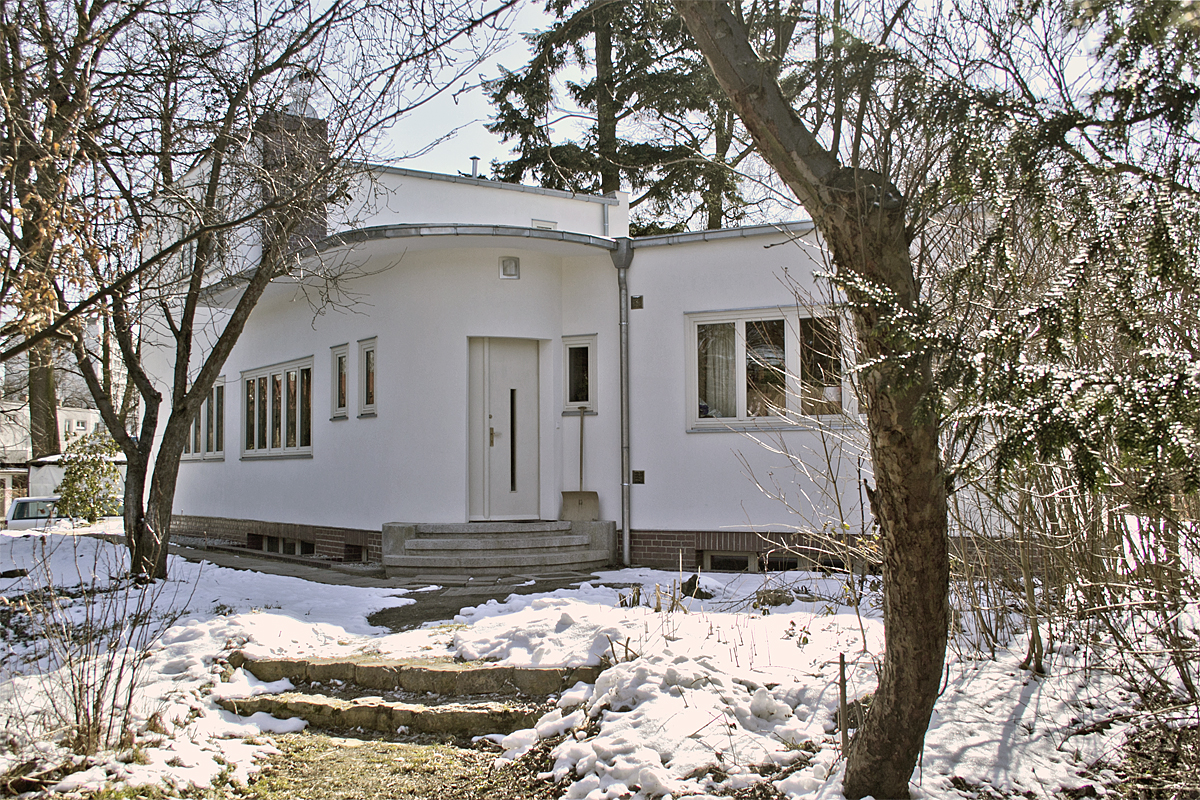
One of the WuWA buildings, Zielonego Dębu street

WuWA (German: Wohnungs- und Werkraumausstellung, lit. 'Workplace and House Exhibition') was a building exhibition held in Breslau, Weimar Republic (today Wrocław, Poland) in 1929.

Organized by the Silesian committee of the Deutsche Werkbund, close to the Scheitniger Park (currently Tramwajowa, Dembowskiego, Mikołaja Kopernika and Zielonego Dębu streets). Several local architects, mainly members of Werkbund, participated in the exhibition. 32 different types of buildings were presented to serve as "standards." The main focus was on simple, but not trivial architectonical form and functionality. All 32 buildings were built within a three-month period. Recreational areas were a part of this project, together with a wooden kindergarten which was supposed to show new architectural trends.

One of the most interesting buildings of the complex is Hans Scharoun's house for singles and young couples, which now serves as a hotel. The entire area received the European Heritage Label from the European Commission.

== Architects ==
- Theodor Effenberger
- Moritz Hadda
- Paul Häusler
- Paul Heim and Albert Kempter
- Emil Lange
- Heinrich Lauterbach
- Ludwig Moshamer
- Adolf Rading
- Hans Scharoun
- Gustav Wolf

== Locations ==
| House | Address | Opis | Project | Photo |
|---|---|---|---|---|
| #1 | 2 Tramwajowa Street | A gallery rental house with a waiting room for those waiting for a streetcar. | House: Paul Heim i Albert Kempter Garden: Erich Vergin | |
| #2 | 18 Wróblewskiego Street | A one-storey building with a flat roof and a skylight illuminating the interior, with a wooden structure designed for a kindergarten for 60 children. | House: Paul Heim i Albert Kempter Garden: Erich Vergin | |
| #3-6 | 2a Tramwajowa Street | Multi-family, eight-family rental house. | House: Gustav Wolf Interior: Ulrich Stein, Albert Müller, Rudolf Mestel Garden: Erich Vergin | |
| #7 | 2b Tramwajowa Street | Four-storey rental house. | House: Heinrich Lauterbach Interior: Adolf Rading, Josef Vinecký, Li Vinecký-Thon | |
| #8 | Tramwajowa Street | Garages, the building has not been completed. | Adolf Rading | |
| #9-22 | 4–30 Tramwajowa Street | A complex of thirteen terraced single-family houses (No. 10-22) and a four-family rented corner house (No. 9). | House: Emil Lange (nr 9), Ludwig Moshamer (nr 10–12), Heinrich Lauterbach (nr 13–15), Moritz Hadda (nr 16–17), Paul Häusler (nr 18–20), Theo Effenberger (nr 21–22) Interior: Emil Lange, Paul Heim, Eugen Weigt, Hilda Krebs (nr 9), H.E. Fritsche, Pohl Oels (nr 10 –12), Heinrich tischler (nr 16–17), Paul Häusler (nr 18–20), Ulrich Roediger (nr 21–22) Garden: Erich Vergin (nr 9), Paul Hatt (nr 10–15 i 21–22) | |
| #23-25 | Tramwajowa Street | Private rental house, has not been completed. | Theo Effenberger | |
| #26-27 | 11/13 Dembowskiego Street | One-storey two-family house with garages, both apartments with an area of 185 m2. | House: Theo Effenberger Interior: Ulrich Stein Ogród: Paul Hatt | |
| #28 | 9 Dembowskiego Street | One-storey single-family house with a garage, designed for a family of 6-7 people with a servant | House: Emil Lange Interior: Wilhelm Stephan, Hilda Krebs, Emil Lange Garden: Kurt Schütze | |
| #29-30 | 23/25 Zielonego Dębu Street | One-storey two-family house for seven people | House: Paul Häusler Wnętrze: Paul Häusler, Fritz Kleeman Garden: Julius Schütze | |
| #31 | 9 Kopernika Street | Hotel house for childless couples and single people. | House: Hans Scharoun Interior: Hans Scharoun | |
| #32-33 | 7/8 Kopernika Street | One-storey two-family house with a gable roof. | House: Gustav Wolf Garden: Fritz Hanisch | |
| #34 | Zielonego Dębu Street | Single-family house, the building has not been completed. | Heinrich Lauterbach | |
| #35 | 17 Zielonego Dębu Street | Single-family building for a factory director or a senior official and his family of four and a maid. | House: Heinrich Lauterbach Interior: Heinrich Lauterbach, Anna Rading Garden: Julius Schütze | |
| #36 | 19 Zielonego Dębu Street | Single-family house designed for a white-collar worker and his family. | House: Moritz Hadda Interior: Moritz Hadda, Martin Rosenstein, Anna Rading Garden: Moritz Hadda | |
| #37 | 21 Zielonego Dębu Street | Single-family house designed for a senior official, merchant or freelancer. | House: Ludwig Moshamer Interior: Ludwik Moshamer, H.E. Fritsche Garden: Julius Schütze | |

== Bibliography ==
- Beelitz, Konstanze; Niclas Förster (2006). Breslau/Wrocław Przewodnik po architekturze modernistycznej. Via Nova. ISBN 83-60544-52-2.
- Rudolf von Delius: Werkbund-Versuchssiedlung in Breslau. In: Dekorative Kunst, illustrierte Zeitschrift für angewandte Kunst, Bd. 37 = Jg. 32, 1928/29, S. 273–281(Digitalisat).
- Edith Rischowski: Das Wohnhaus als Einheit. Häuser und Räume der Versuchssiedlung Breslau. In: Innen-Dekoration, Jg. 40, 1929, S. 400–432 (Digitalisat).
- Wohnung und Werkraum. Werkbund Ausstellung Breslau 1929. In: Der Baumeister, Jg. 27, 1929, S. 285–307, Tafel 85/86–100.
- Georg Münter: Wohnung und Werkraum. Ein Versuch die Werkbund-Ausstellung in Breslau 1929 zu würdigen. In: Wasmuths Monatshefte für Baukunst, Jg. 13, 1929, S. 441–453 (Digitalisat).
- Kaiser: Die Werkbund-Ausstellung: "Wohnung und Werkraum" Breslau 1929. In: Die Bauzeitung. Vereinigt mit "Süddeutsche Bauzeitung" München, Jg. 26, Heft 39, 28. September 1929, S. 415–421 und Heft 40, 5. Oktober 1929, S. 423–429.
- Alena Janatková, Hanna Kozinska-Witt (Hrsg.): Wohnen in der Großstadt 1900–1939. Franz Steiner Verlag, Stuttgart 2006, ISBN 3-515-08345-6.
- Judith Lembke: Die neue Welt von gestern, in: Frankfurter Allgemeine Zeitung vom 30. Nov. 2016
- Bundesinstitut für Ostdeutsche Kultur und Geschichte (Hrsg.): Jahrbuch des Bundesinstituts für Ostdeutsche Kultur und Geschichte. Band 3, Oldenbourg Wissenschaftsverlag, München 1995, ISBN 3-486-56102-2.
- Institut für Auslandsbeziehungen (Hrsg.): Auf dem Weg zum Neuen Wohnen – Die Werkbundsiedlung Breslau 1929. Birkhäuser Verlag, Berlin 1996, ISBN 3-7643-5420-8
- Deutscher Werkbund Hessen, Arbeitsgruppe »WUWA Breslau« Hg.: Helmut Hofmann. Architekt und Künstler, Student an der Kunstakademie Breslau 1928/1929. Ausstellungskatalog der Ausst. in Wrocław 1999. Frankfurt 1999, S. 16 ff. (ohne ISBN, zweisprachig deutsch-polnisch)
- Jadwiga Urbanik / Grażyna Hryncewicz-Lamber: WuWA – Wohnung und Werkraum. Werkbundausstellung in Breslau 1929, 2. Aufl., Wrocław 2015, ISBN 978-83-938968-2-0 (online).
