= Siemensstadt =

- Quarter of Berlin
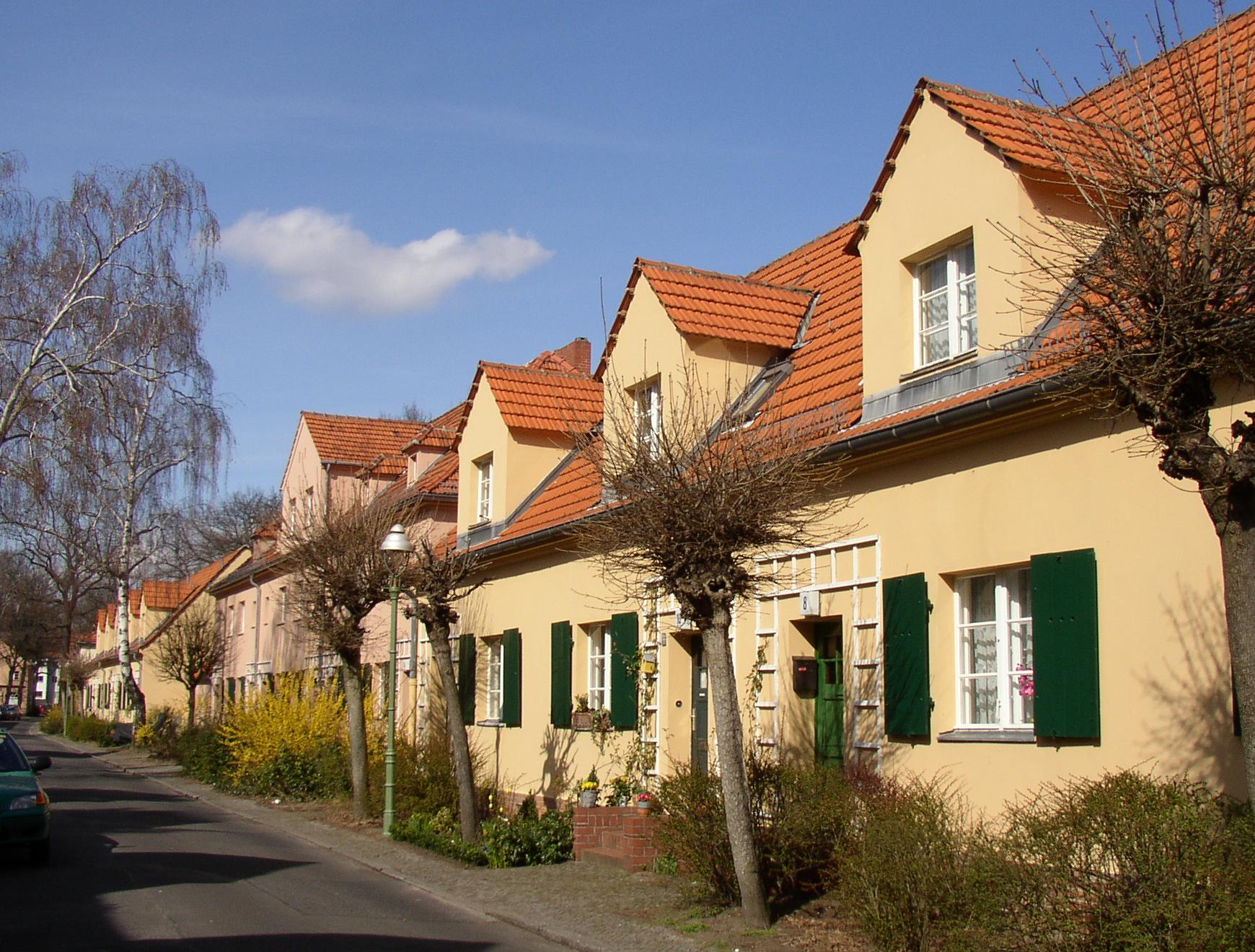
- Rapsstrasse

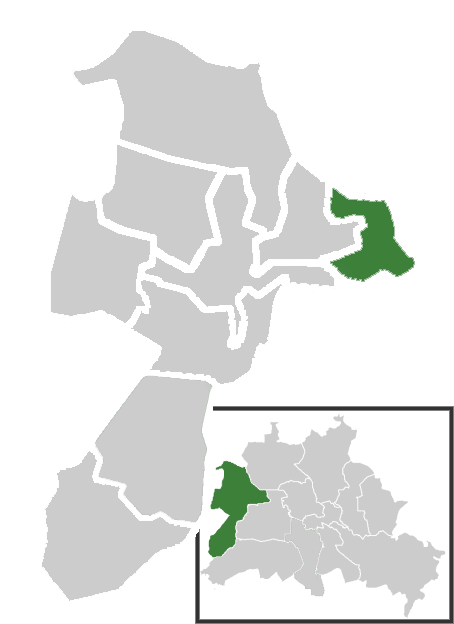
- Location of Siemensstadt in Spandau district and Berlin
- Interactive map of Siemensstadt
- Location within Germany Location within Berlin
- Coordinates: 52°32′26″N 13°15′47″E
- Country: Germany
- State: Berlin
- City: Berlin
- Borough: Spandau
- Founded: 1913

Area
  - Total: 5.66 km^{2} (2.19 sq mi)
- Elevation: 35 m (115 ft)

Population (2024-12-31)
  - Total: 13,438
  - Density: 2,370/km^{2} (6,150/sq mi)
- Time zone: UTC+01:00 (CET)
  - Summer (DST): UTC+02:00 (CEST)
- Postal codes: 13629
- Vehicle registration: B

Siemensstadt (German: [ˈziːmənsˌʃtat]) is a locality (Ortsteil) of Berlin in the district (Bezirk) of Spandau.

== History ==
The locality emerged when the company Siemens & Halske (S & H), one of the predecessors of today's Siemens, bought land in the area, in order to expand production of S & H and their subsidiary Siemens-Schuckertwerke (SSW) as well. On the initiative of Georg Wilhelm von Siemens, S & H started to build new factories in 1899. Soon also residential buildings were erected. The locality was incorporated into Berlin on 1 October 1920 by the Greater Berlin Act.

During World War II, Siemensstadt was the location of a subcamp of the Sachsenhausen concentration camp for men and women, mostly Hungarian Jews, but also Bulgarians, French, Italians, Yugoslavs, Dutch, Poles, Czechoslovaks, Russians and Ukrainians.

== Geography ==
Siemensstadt is situated on the eastern side of the Spandau district. It borders Spandau (locality), Haselhorst, Tegel (in Reinickendorf), Charlottenburg-Nord and Westend (both in Charlottenburg-Wilmersdorf). The Großsiedlung Siemensstadt is situated close to Siemensstadt but in Charlottenburg-Nord.

== Transport ==
Siemensstadt is served by the Berliner U-Bahn line U7 at the stations of Paulsternstrasse, Rohrdamm and Siemensdamm.

== Images ==
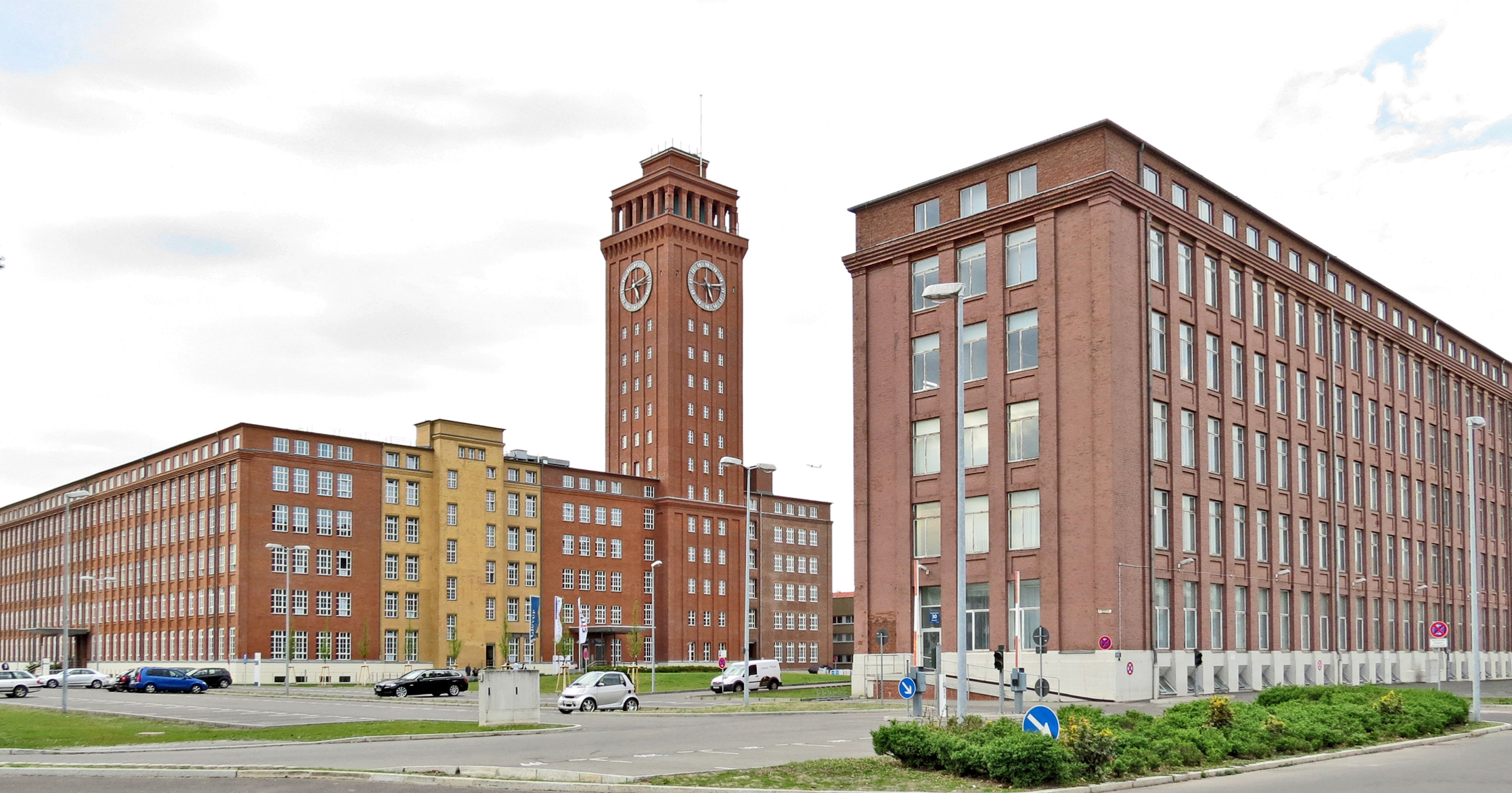
Siemens-Tower

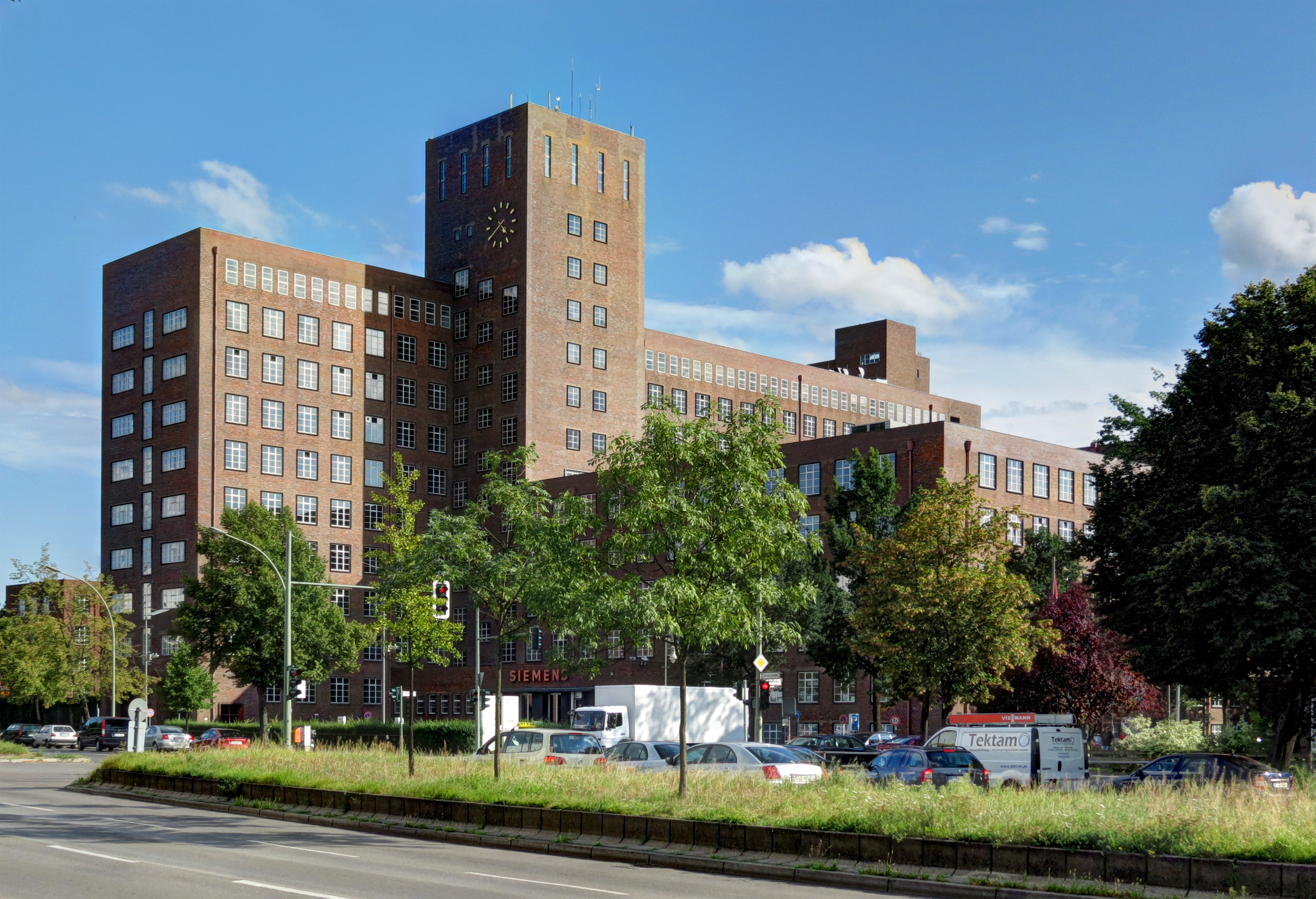
Wernerwerk (Werner's Factory)

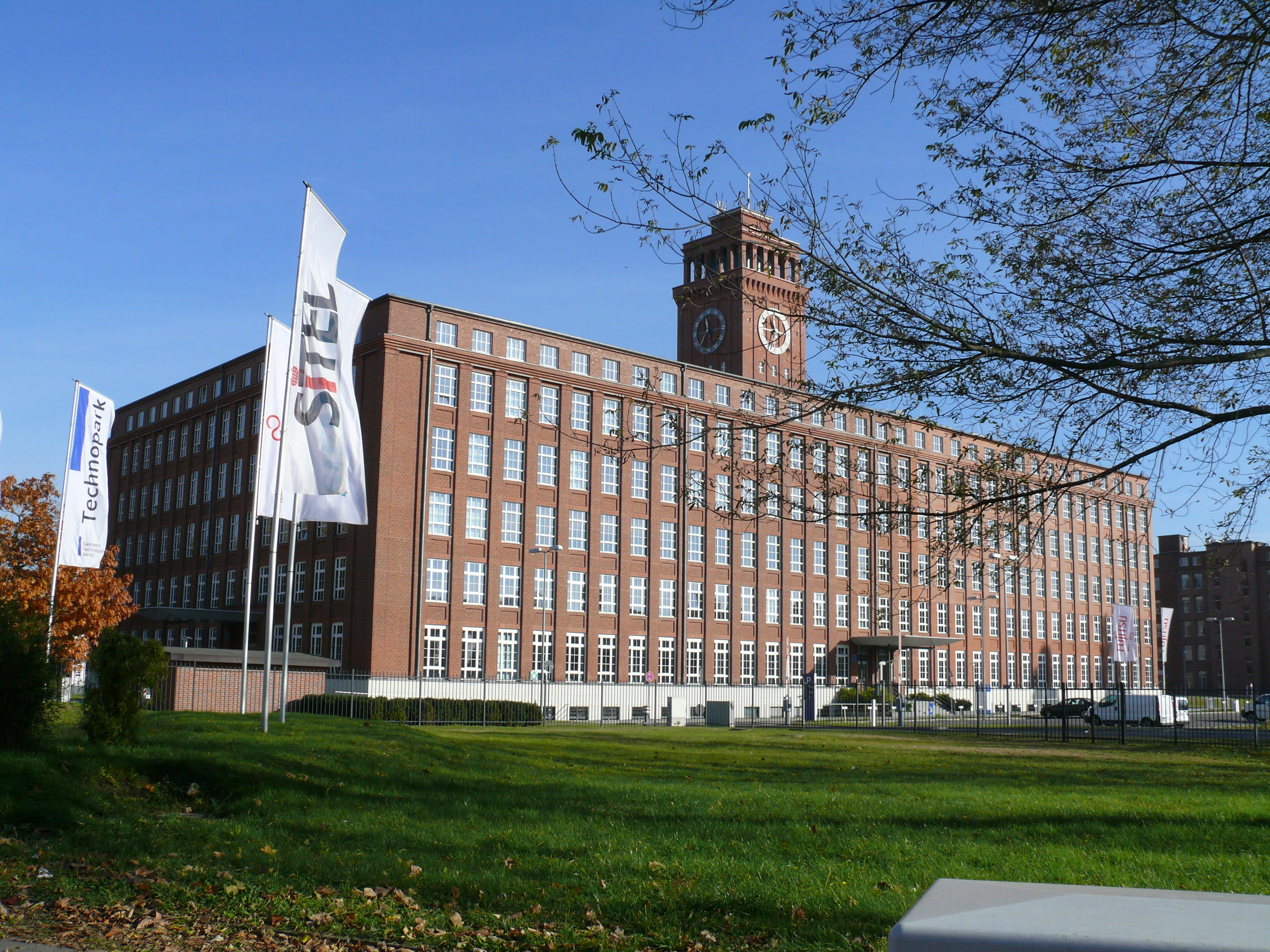
Wernerwerk II

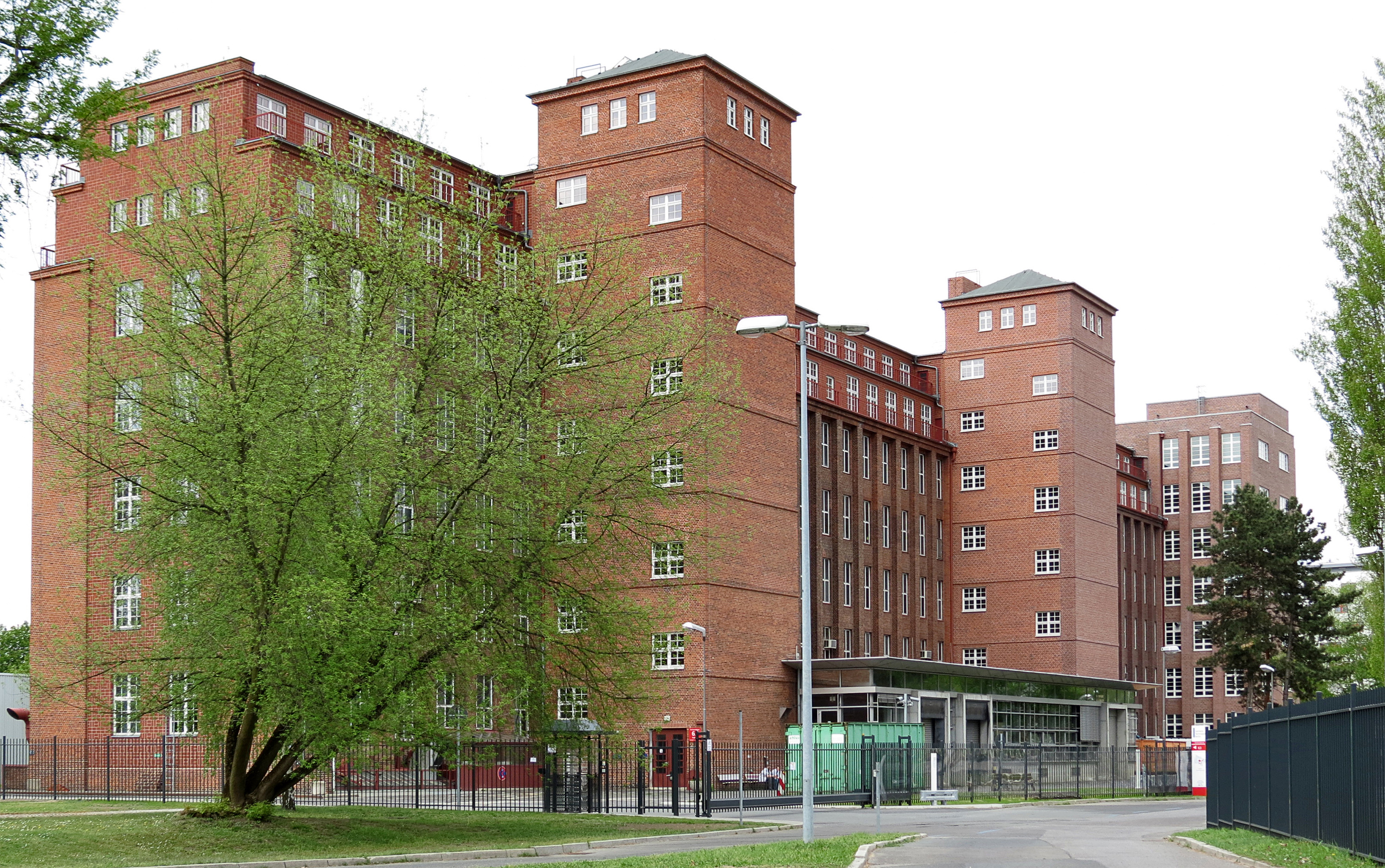
Wernerwerk XV

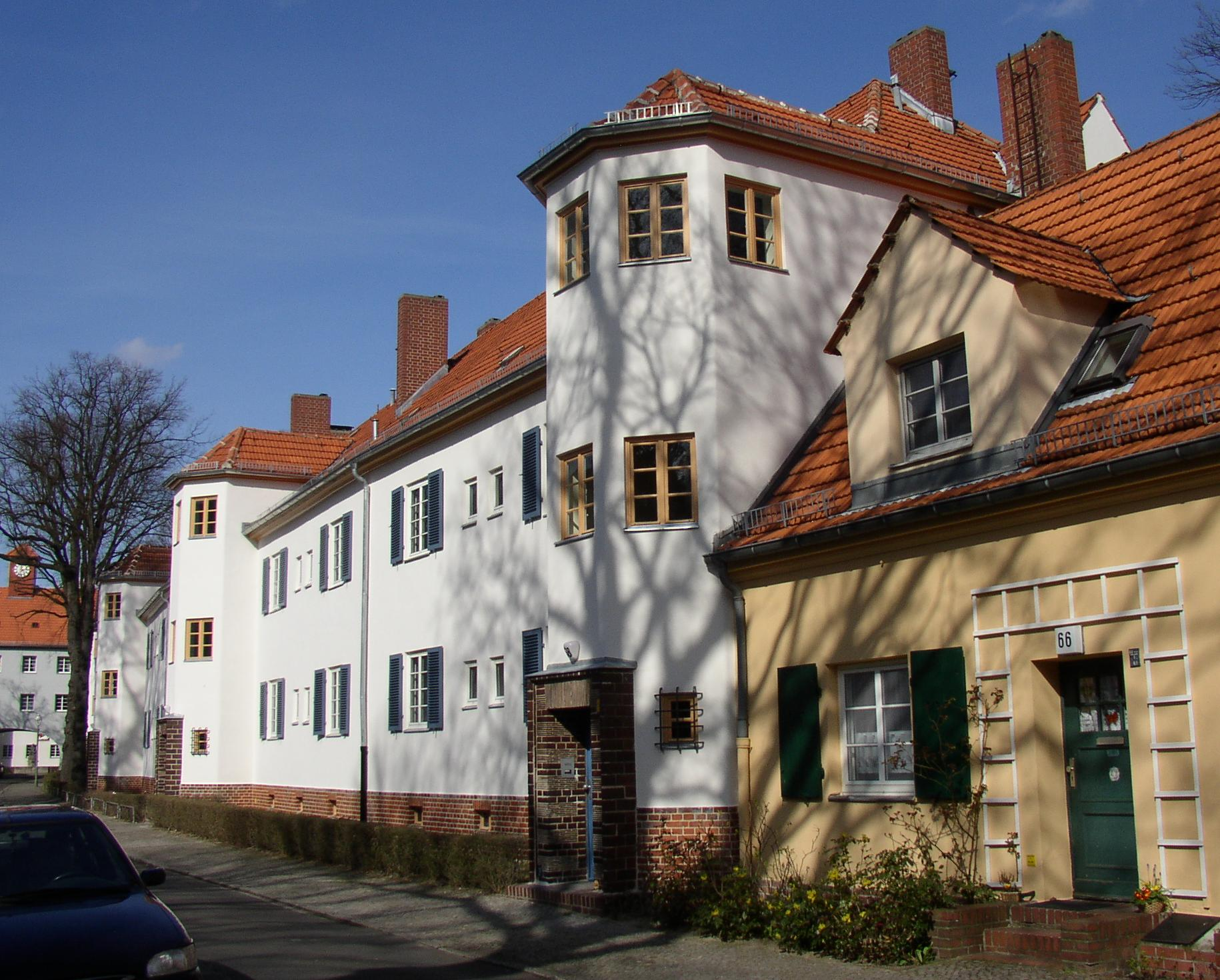
Rapsstrasse, northern part

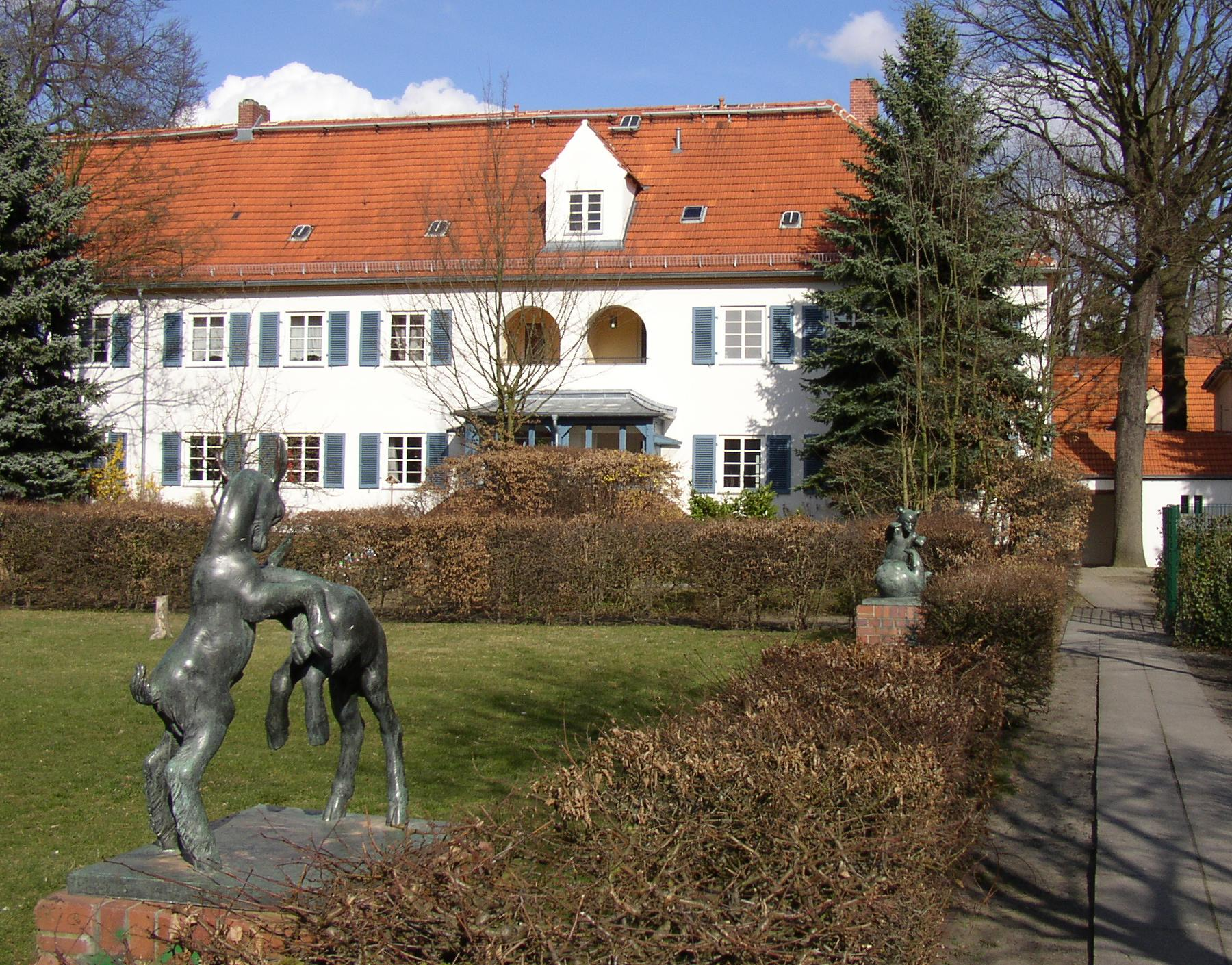
Rapsstrasse

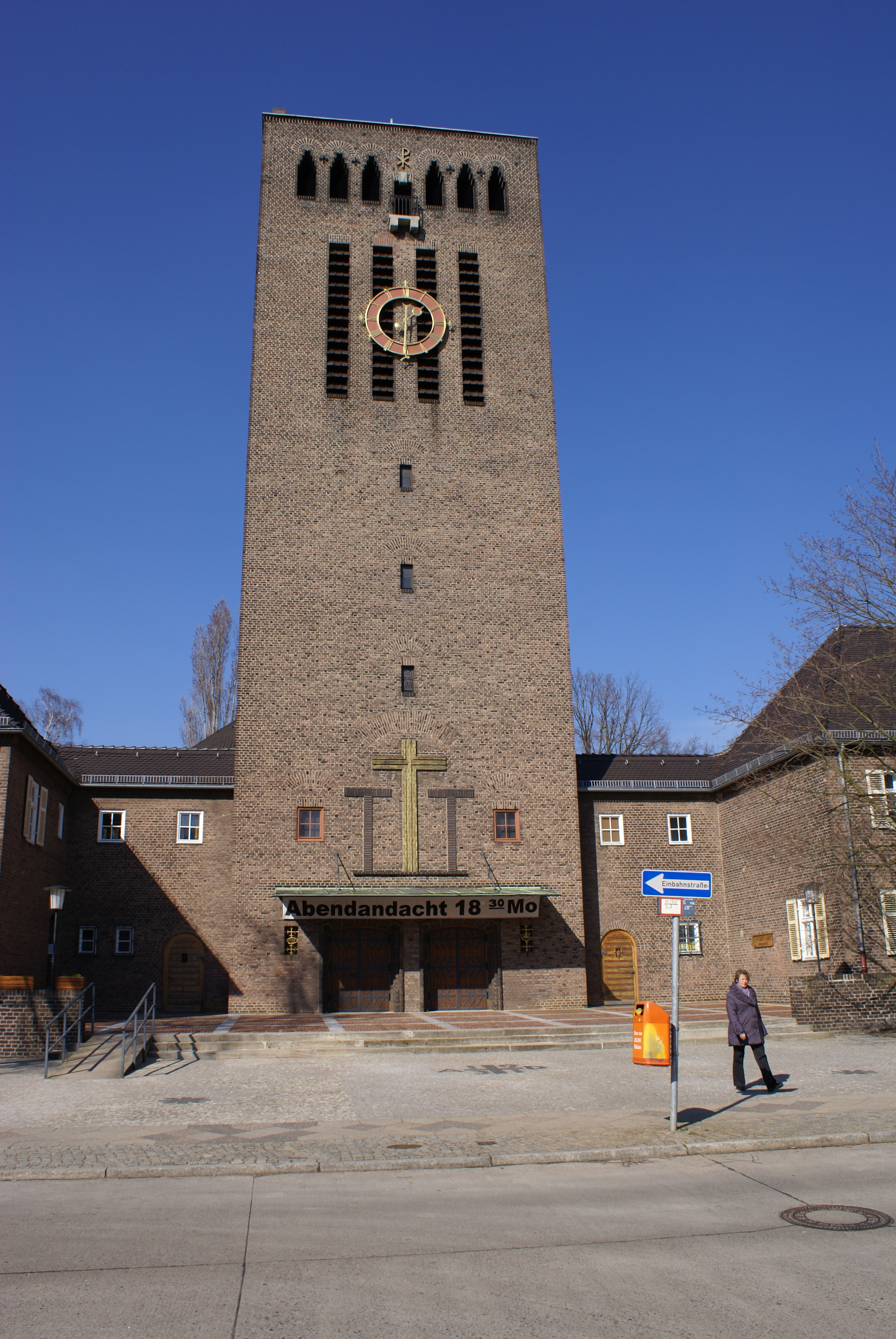
Christophorus Church

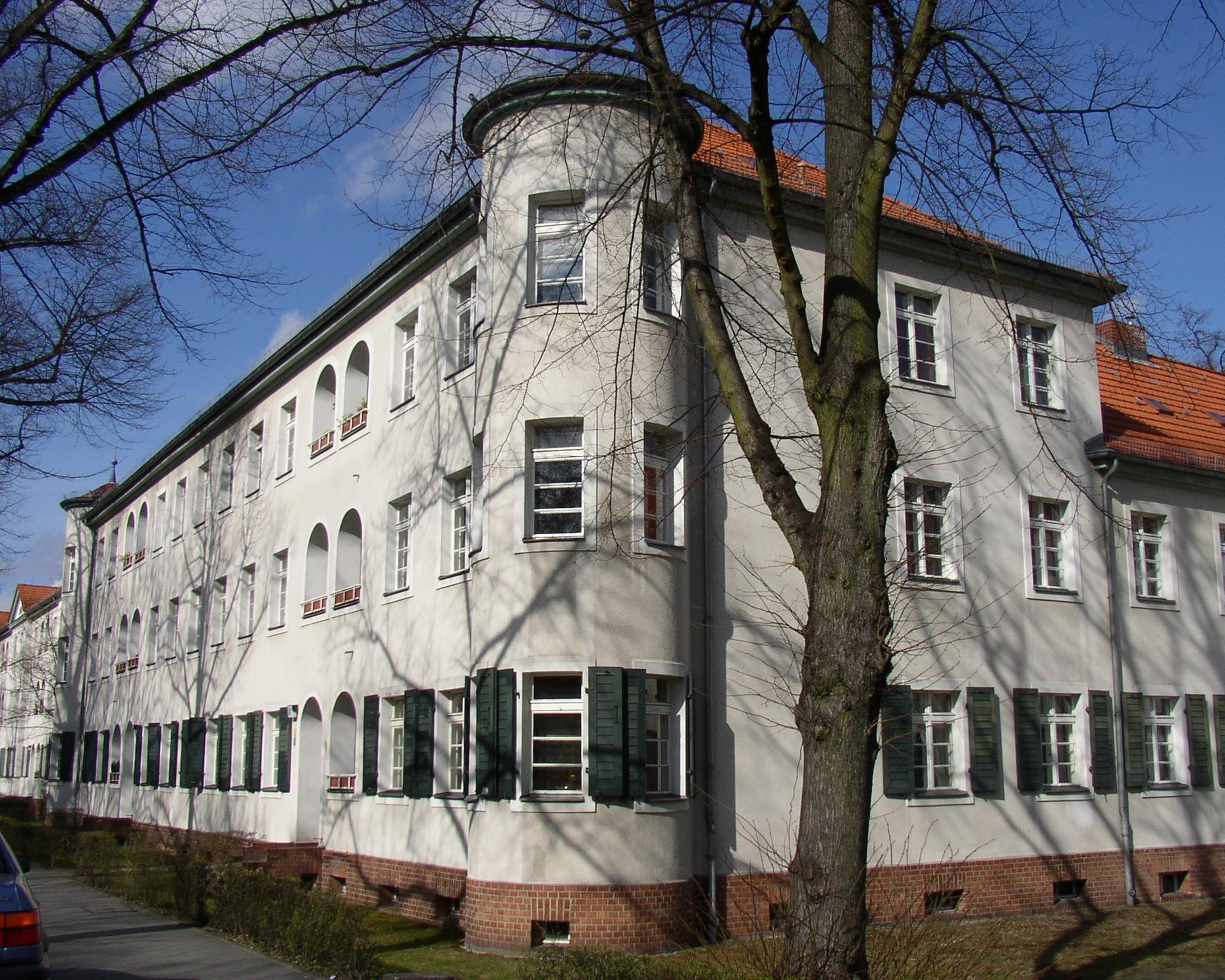
Rohrdamm

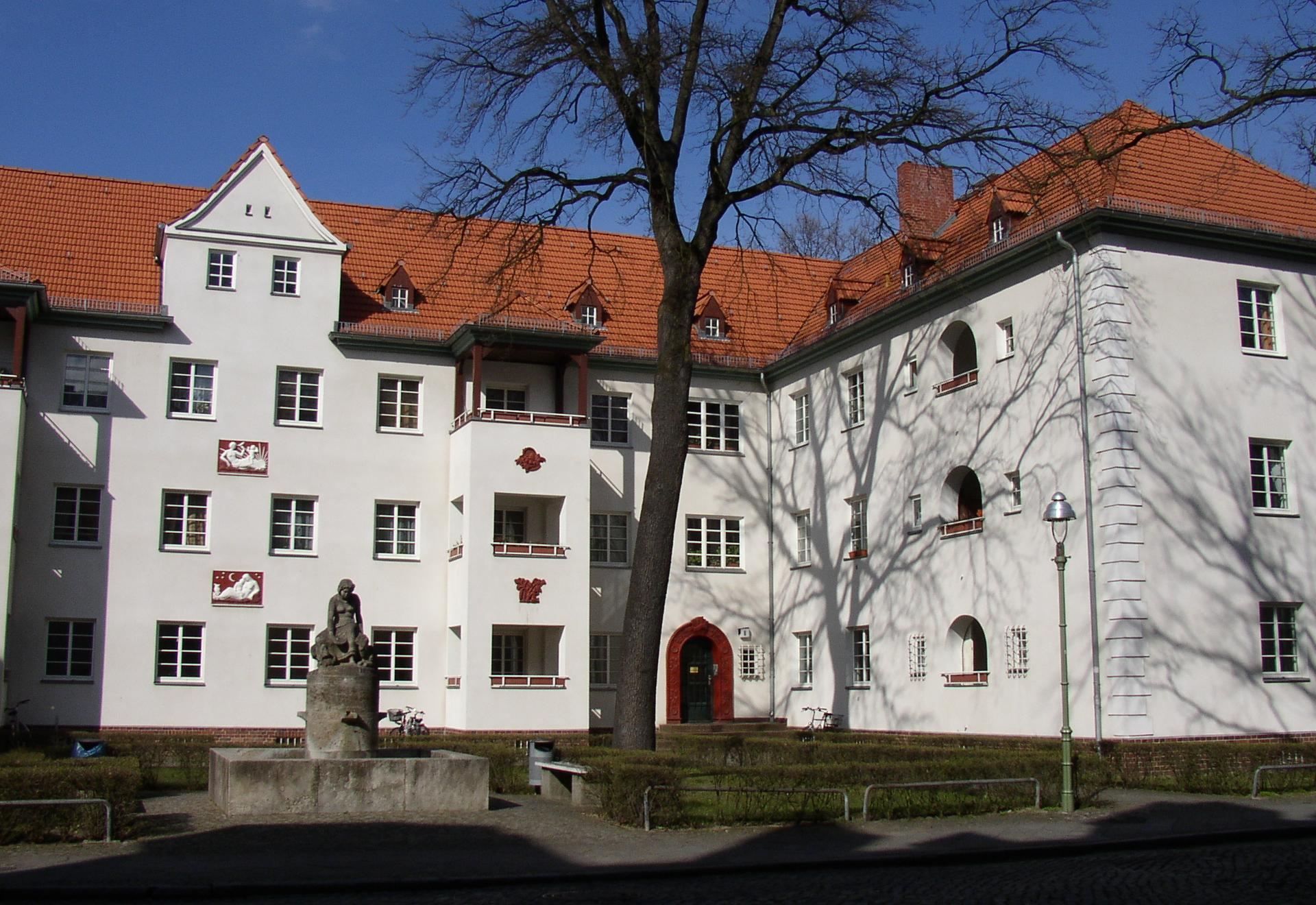
Genoveva-Fountain

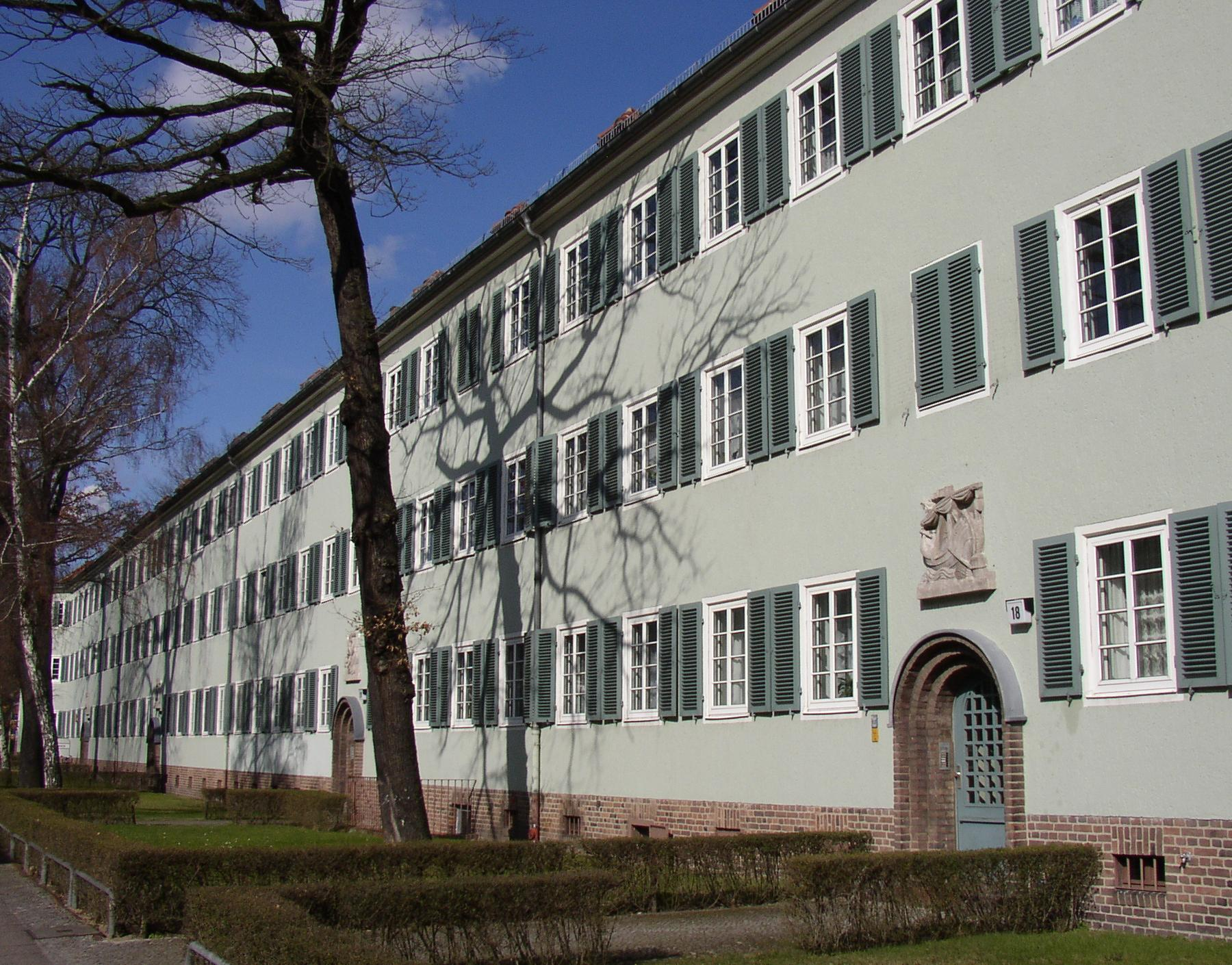
Rieppelstrasse

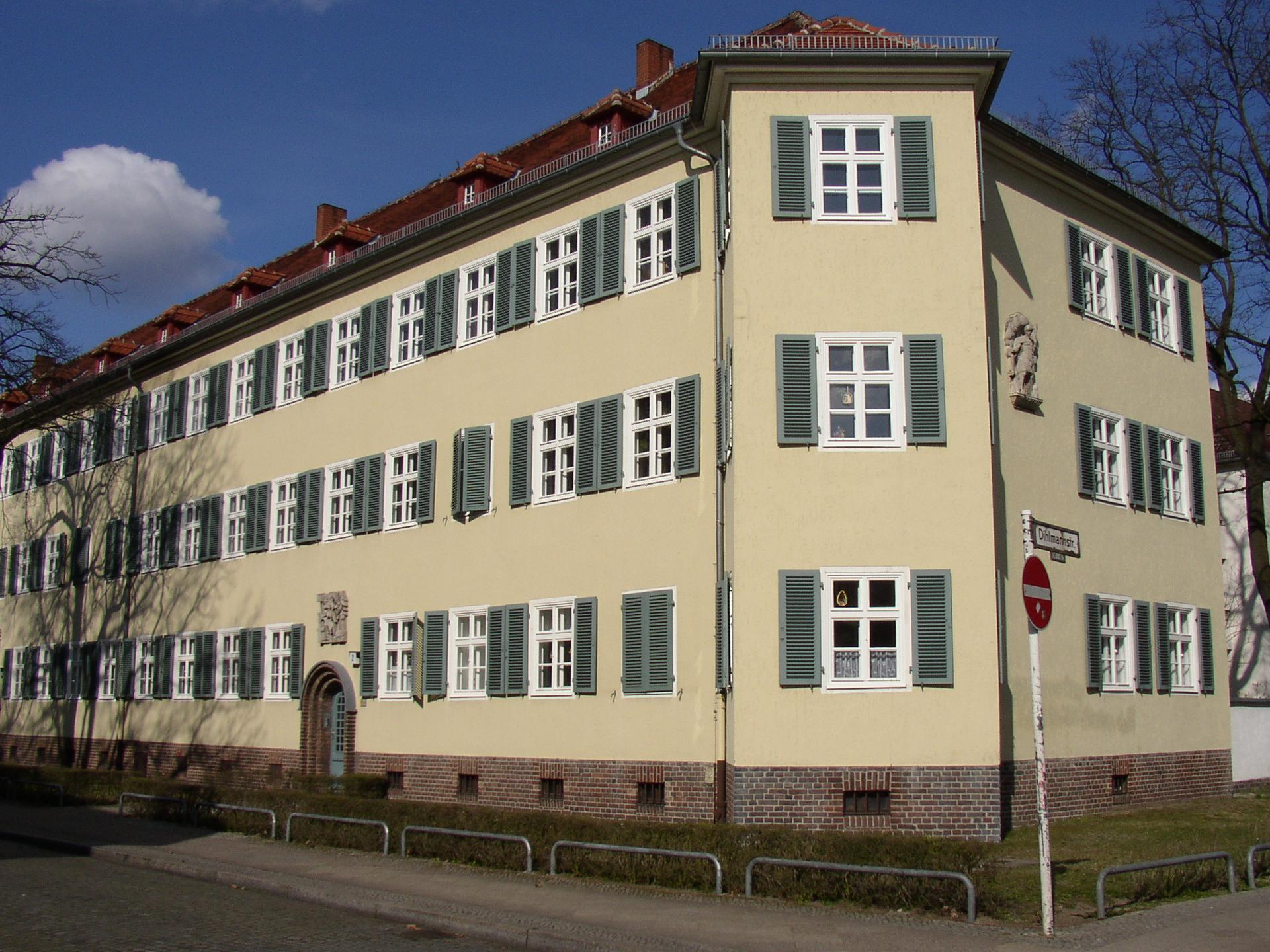
Rieppel- Ecke Dihlmannstrasse

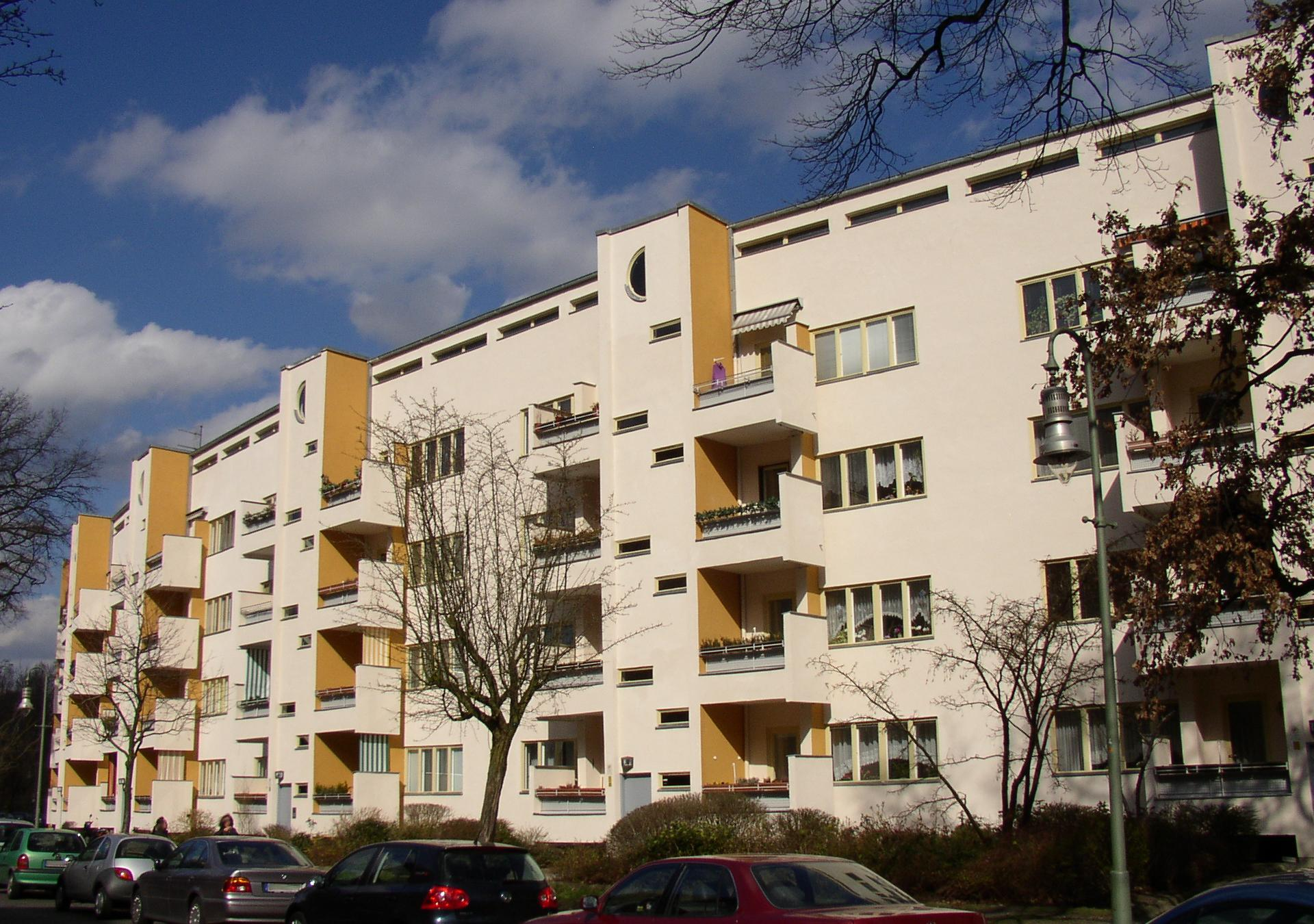
Maeckeritzstrasse

== See also ==
- Großsiedlung Siemensstadt
