= Embassy of Germany, Brasília =

German diplomatic mission to Brazil

Coordinates: 15.8213°S 47.8863°W

- Location: Brasília, Brazil
- Address: Avenida das Nações, Lote 25, Quadra 807
- Ambassador: Georg Witschel

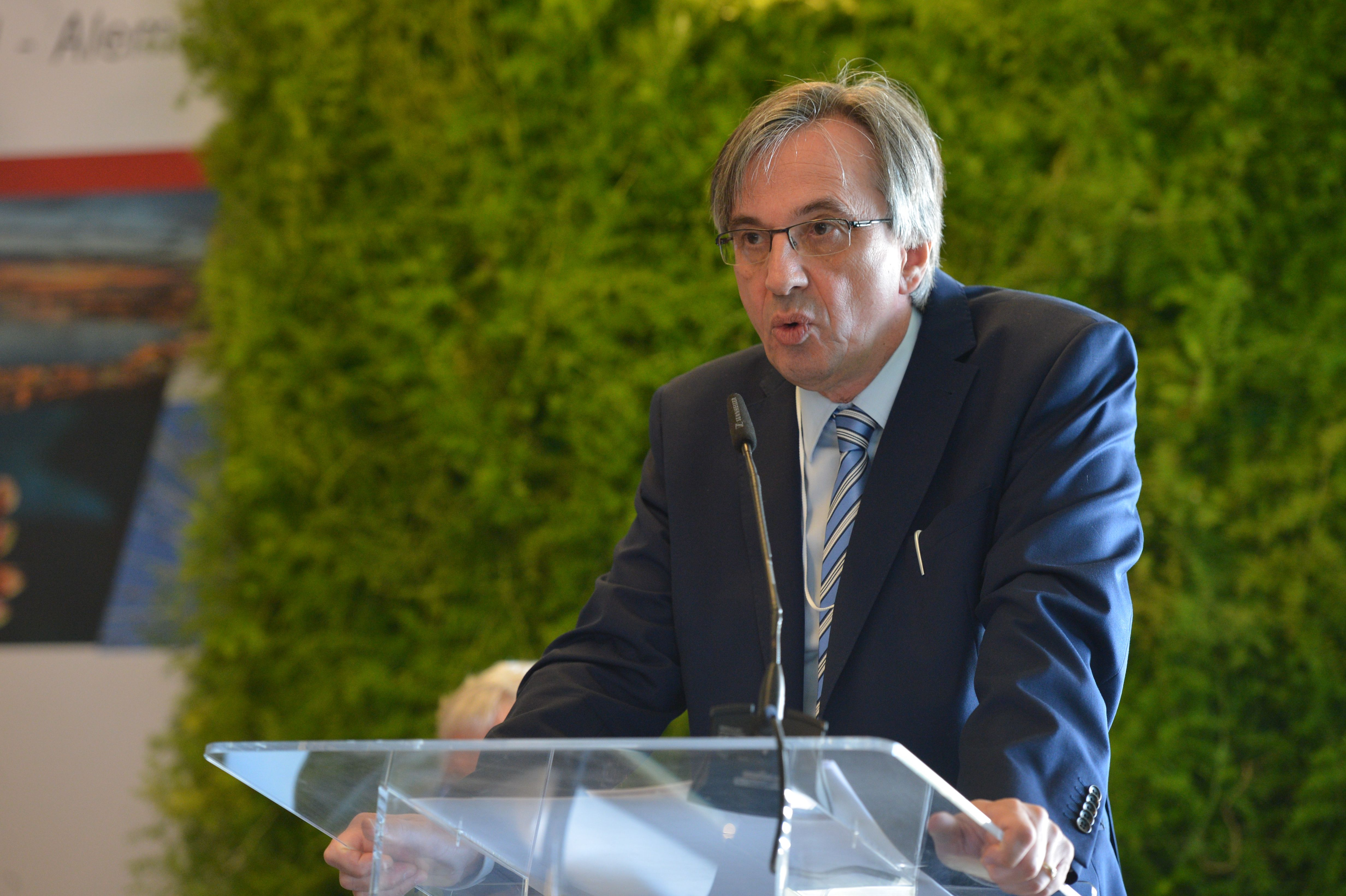
"Botschafter" Georg Witschel (2015)

The Embassy of Germany (Portuguese: Embaixada da Alemanha em Brasília) in Brasília is Germany's embassy to Brazil. It is located on Avenida das Nações, Lote 25, Quadra 807. The embassy building was designed by German architect Hans Scharoun.

The current ambassador is Georg Witschel.

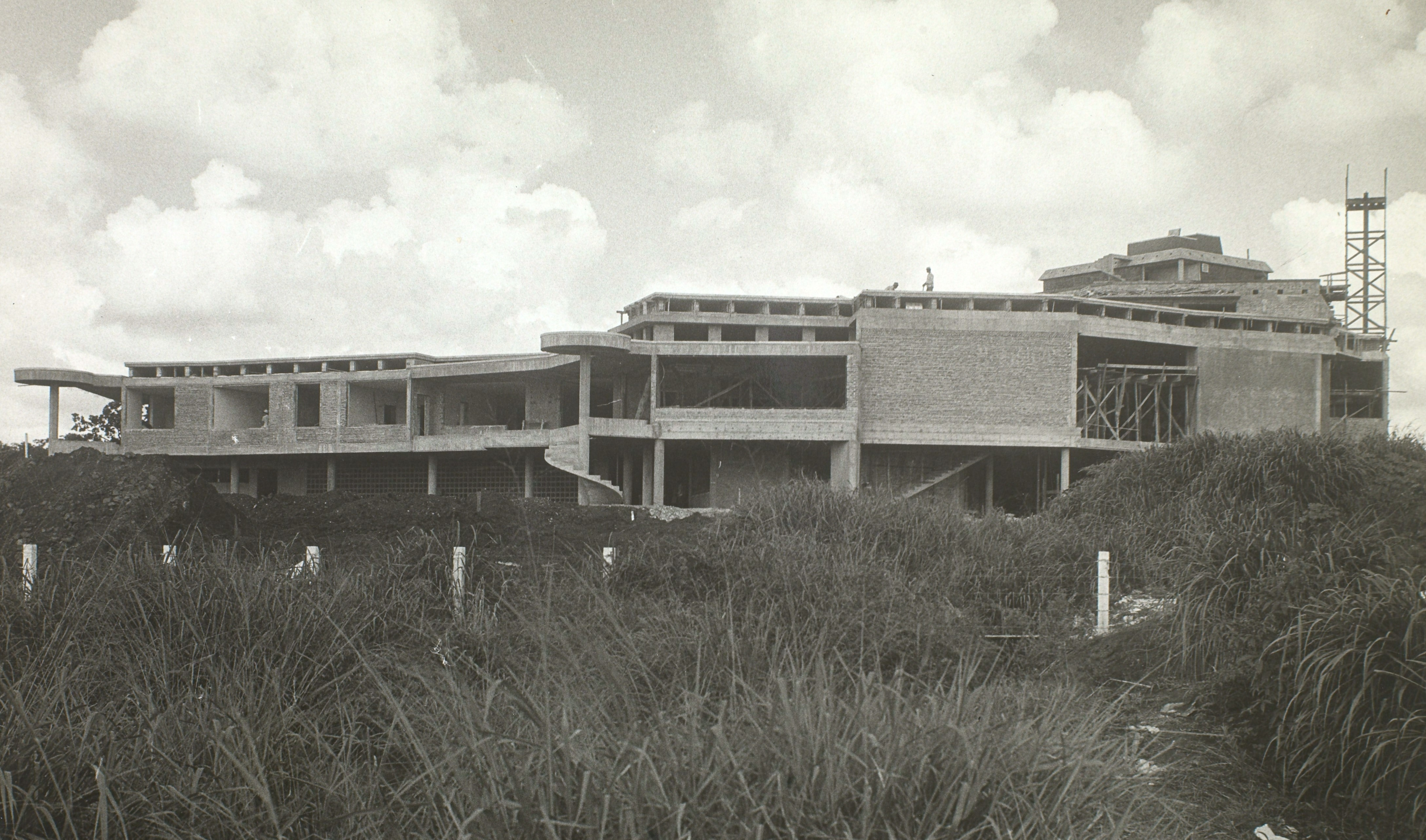
The embassy during its construction

== Consulates ==
There are several consulates located through Brazil:

- Consulate General in Porto Alegre (Consul General Hans-Josef Over)
- Consulate General in Recife (Consul General Thomas Wülfing)
- Consulate General in Rio de Janeiro (Consul General Michael Worbs)
- Consulate General in São Paulo (Consul General Matthias Ludwig Bogislav von Kummer)
- as well as several Honorary Consuls in Anápolis, Belém, Belo Horizonte, Blumenau, Cuiabá, Curitiba, Fortaleza, Joinville, Manaus, Ribeirão Preto, Rolândia, Salvador, Santos and Vitória.
