= Hans Scharoun =

German architect (1893–1972)

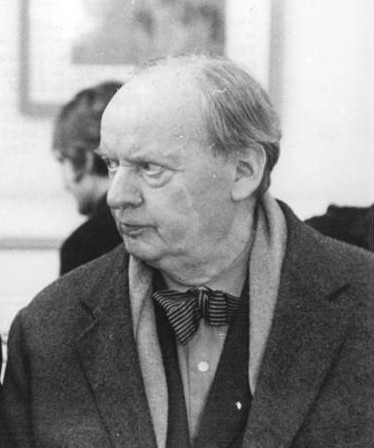
Hans Scharoun (1966)

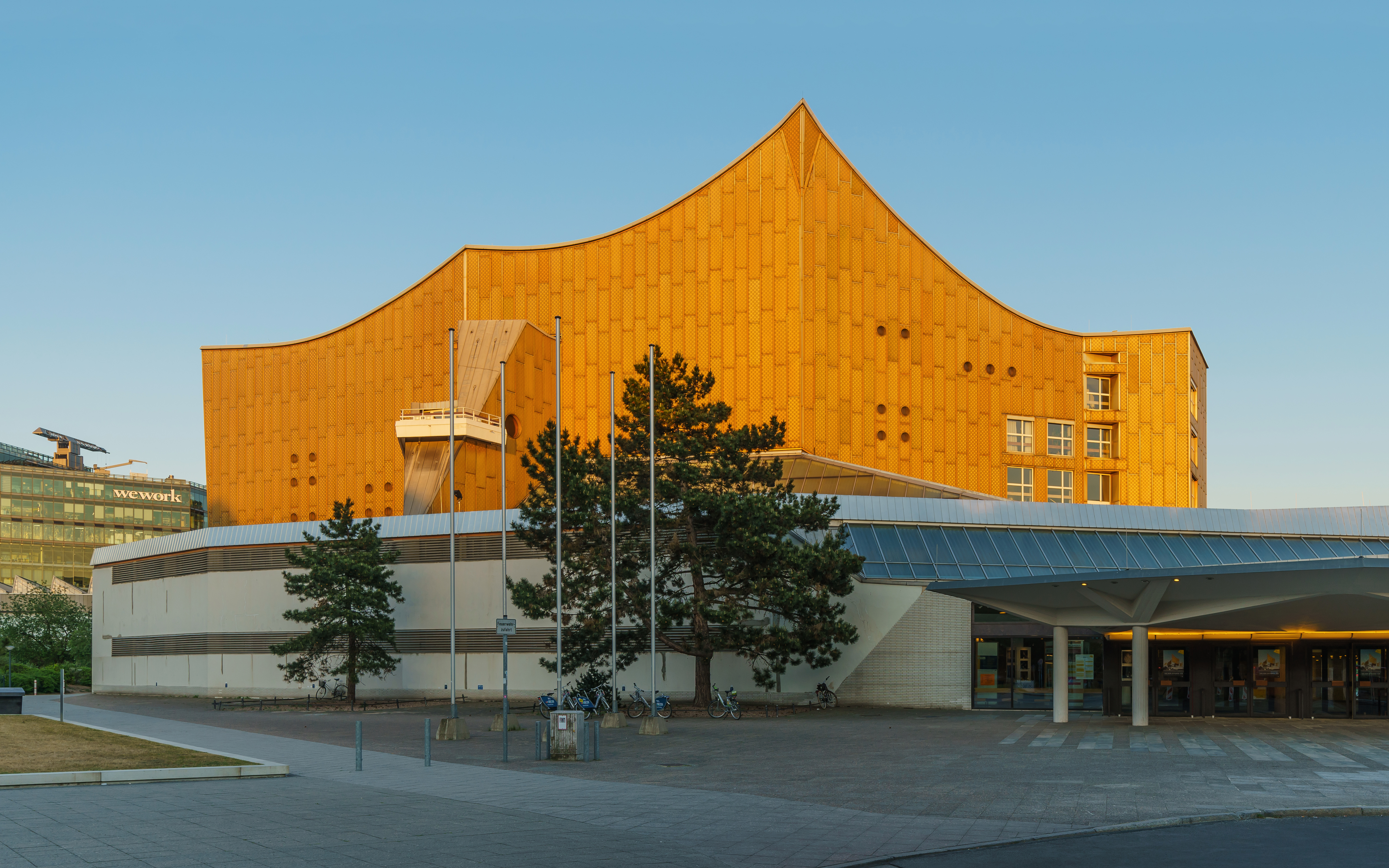
Berliner Philharmonie

Bernhard Hans Henry Scharoun (German: [hans ʃaˈʁuːn]; 20 September 1893 – 25 November 1972) was a German architect best known for designing the Berliner Philharmonie (home to the Berlin Philharmonic) and the Schminke House in Löbau, Saxony. He was an important exponent of organic and expressionist architecture.

== Life ==
=== 1893 to 1924 ===
Scharoun was born in Bremen. After passing his Abitur in Bremerhaven in 1912, Scharoun studied architecture at Technische Universität Berlin until 1914 (at the time called Königliche Technische Hochschule), but he did not complete his studies. He had already shown an interest in architecture during his school years. At the age of 16 he drafted his first designs, and at 18 he entered for the first time an architectural competition for the modernisation of a church in Bremerhaven.

In 1914 he volunteered to serve in the First World War. Paul Kruchen, his mentor from his time in Berlin, had asked him to assist in a reconstruction program for East Prussia. In 1919, after the war, Scharoun assumed responsibility for its office as a freelance architect in Breslau. There and in Insterburg (Chernyakhovsk), he realised numerous projects and organised art exhibitions, such as the first exhibition of the expressionist group of artists, Die Brücke, in East Prussia.

=== 1925 to 1932 ===
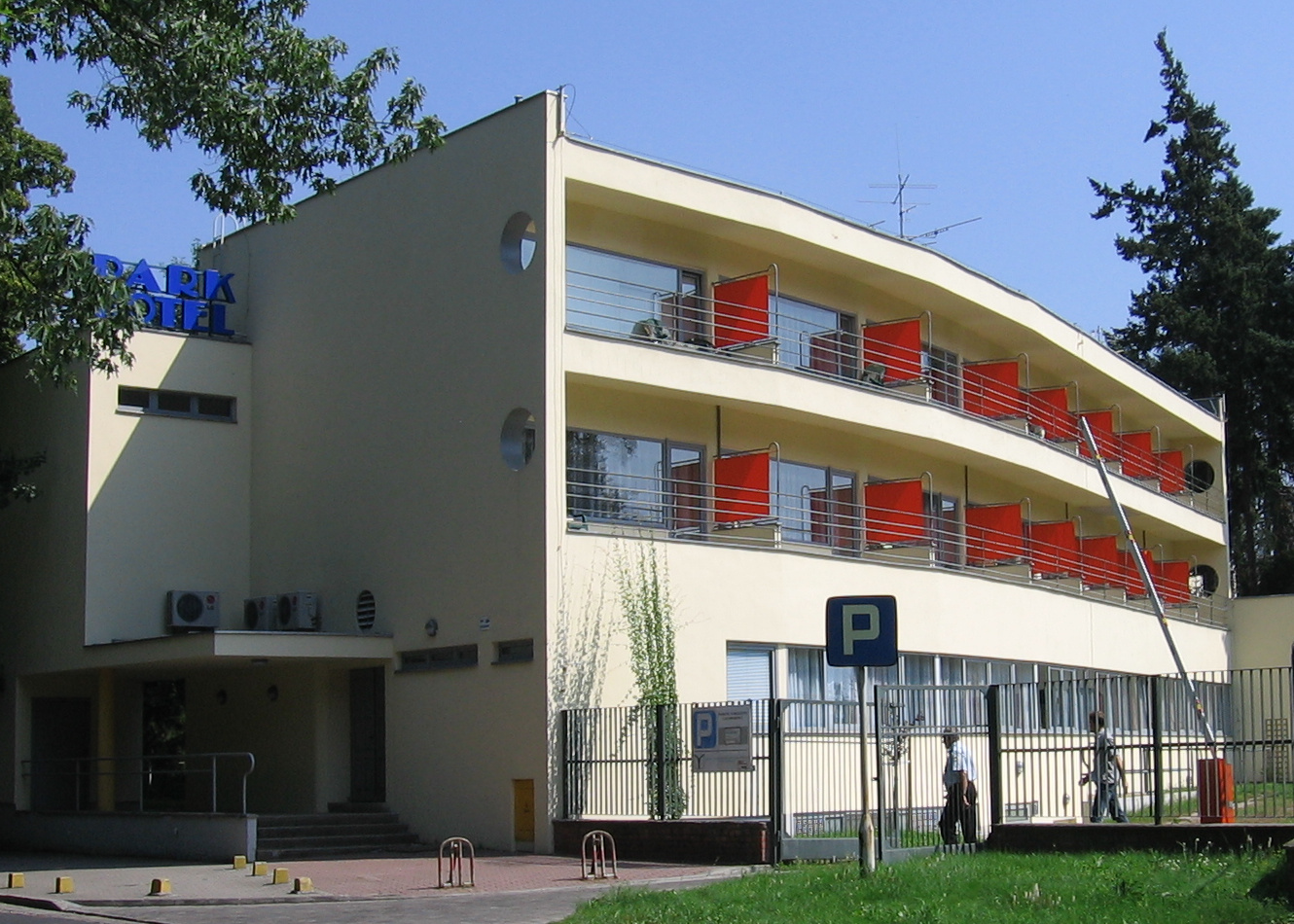
Ledigenheim in Breslau, 1929

He received a professorship at the Staatliche Akademie für Kunst und Kunstgewerbe Breslau (Breslau Academy for Arts and Crafts) where he taught until its closure in 1932. In 1919 he had joined Bruno Taut's expressionist architects group the Glass Chain. In 1926 he entered the architects association Der Ring. In 1927 Scharoun built a house in the Stuttgart Weissenhof Estate. He had responsibility at the end of the twenties for the development plan of a large housing estate, Großsiedlung Siemensstadt, in Berlin. Hugo Häring's theory of the new building inspired Scharoun in a new architectural direction.

=== 1933 to 1945 ===
During the Nazi era he remained in Germany, whilst many of his friends and colleagues from the Glass Chain or Der Ring went abroad. In this time he only built a few family houses, one of which is the remarkable Schminke House (publicly accessible) in the city of Löbau in Saxony (1933). Subsequent houses had to adapt outwardly to politically determined construction specifications, while on the inside they displayed the typically Scharounian sequences of spaces. During the war he was busy with reconstruction after bomb damage. He recorded his architectural ideas and visions secretly in numerous watercolors. With these imaginary architectures he prepared mentally for a time after the Nazis.

=== 1946 to 1972 ===
After the end of the Second World War he was appointed by the Allies to the city building council and named director of the Abteilung Bau- und Wohnungswesen des Magistrats (Department of Building and Municipal Housing). In an exhibition in the destroyed ruins of the Berliner Schloss (Berlin City Palace) titled Berlin plant — Erster Bericht (Berlin plans – First Report), he presented his conceptions for the reconstruction of Berlin and the palace itself. Immediately he found himself in a political no-man's land as the division of the city was becoming apparent.

In 1946 he became a professor at the faculty for architecture at Technische Universität Berlin, with a teaching post at the Lehrstuhl und Institut für Städtebau (Institute for Urban Building).

After the war he was able to realise his architectural understanding, both ambitious and humanistic, in exemplary buildings; e.g., in the Stuttgart apartment towers of Romeo und Julia (Hochhäuser) (1954–59), in the Geschwister-Scholl-Gesamtschule Lünen (1956–62) and in the famed concert hall Berliner Philharmonie (1956–63).

Common to all these buildings is a differentiated organization of space. The school is planned like a small city, and the apartment towers allow for allocation of space and function. The Philharmonic Concert Hall, internationally recognised as "one of the most successful buildings of its kind", is considered as "Scharoun's best work". Around the center of the music podium the ranks of spectators rise in irregularly placed terraces, and the ceiling planes layer themselves like a tent-like firmament over the architectural landscape.

The German Embassy in Brasília (1963–69) remains the only building that he built outside of Germany.

Scharoun died, aged 79, in West Berlin.

=== After his death 1972 ===
Some of his most important buildings were only finished after his 1972 death in Berlin, including the German Maritime Museum in Bremerhaven, the theatre in Wolfsburg and the Berlin State Library. The extension to the Berliner Philharmonie around the Kammermusiksaal, the State Institute for Music Research and Berlin Musical Instrument Museum developed under the supervision of his office partner Edgar Wisniewski, who took over the office after Scharoun's death. During the 1980s, the facade of the Philharmonic Concert Halls was provided with a cladding of gold-anodized aluminum plates; originally it was a white and ocher painted concrete facade.

Scharoun's original designs had planned a similar cladding, which was not implemented at the time for cost reasons. After the reunification of Berlin Potsdamer Platz, adjacent to the east of the Kulturforum, was rebuilt; by this Scharoun's designs concerning city redevelopment of the area could finally be recorded as complete.

=== Awards and prizes ===
- 1954 Honorary Doctorate from the Technische Universität Berlin
- 1954 Fritz Schumacher Prize, Hamburg
- 1955 Berlin Arts Prize
- 1958 Bronze plaque of the Freie Akademie der Künste Hamburg
- 1959 Commander's Cross of the Order of Merit of the Federal Republic of Germany
- 1962 Honorary Senator of Technische Universität Berlin
- 1964 Grand Prize of the Association of German Architects (Großer BDA Preis)
- 1965 Honorary Doctorate from the University of Rome
- 1965 Auguste Perret Prize
- 1969 Honorary citizen of Berlin
- 1970 Erasmus Prize

=== Other activities ===
From 1955 to 1968, Scharoun was the president of the Academy of Arts, Berlin; in 1968 he was honorary president. In 1966, he was a founding member of the Paul-Hindemith-Gesellschaft in Berlin.

== Work ==
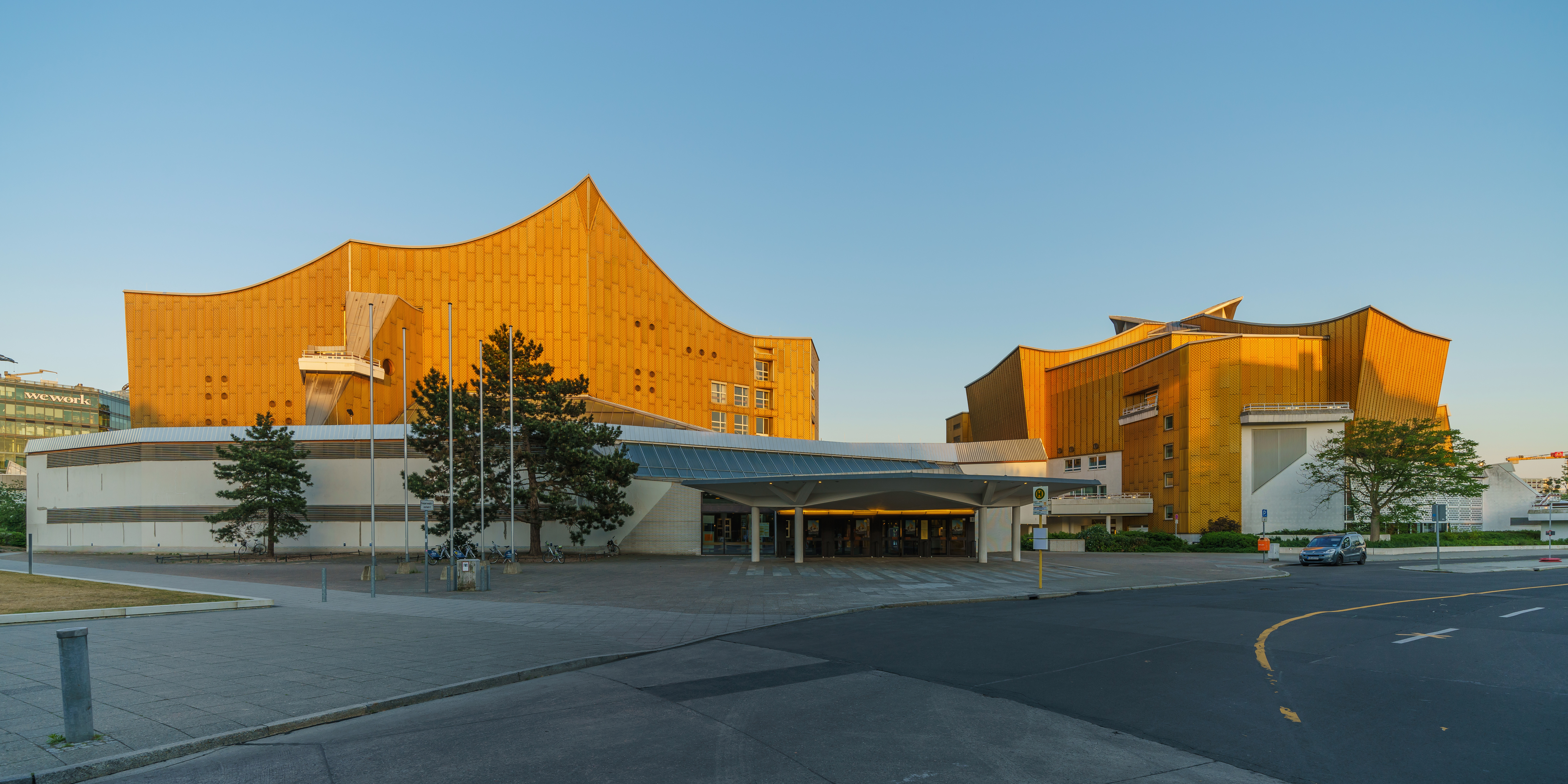
Chamber music hall (right) and Philharmonie in Berlin

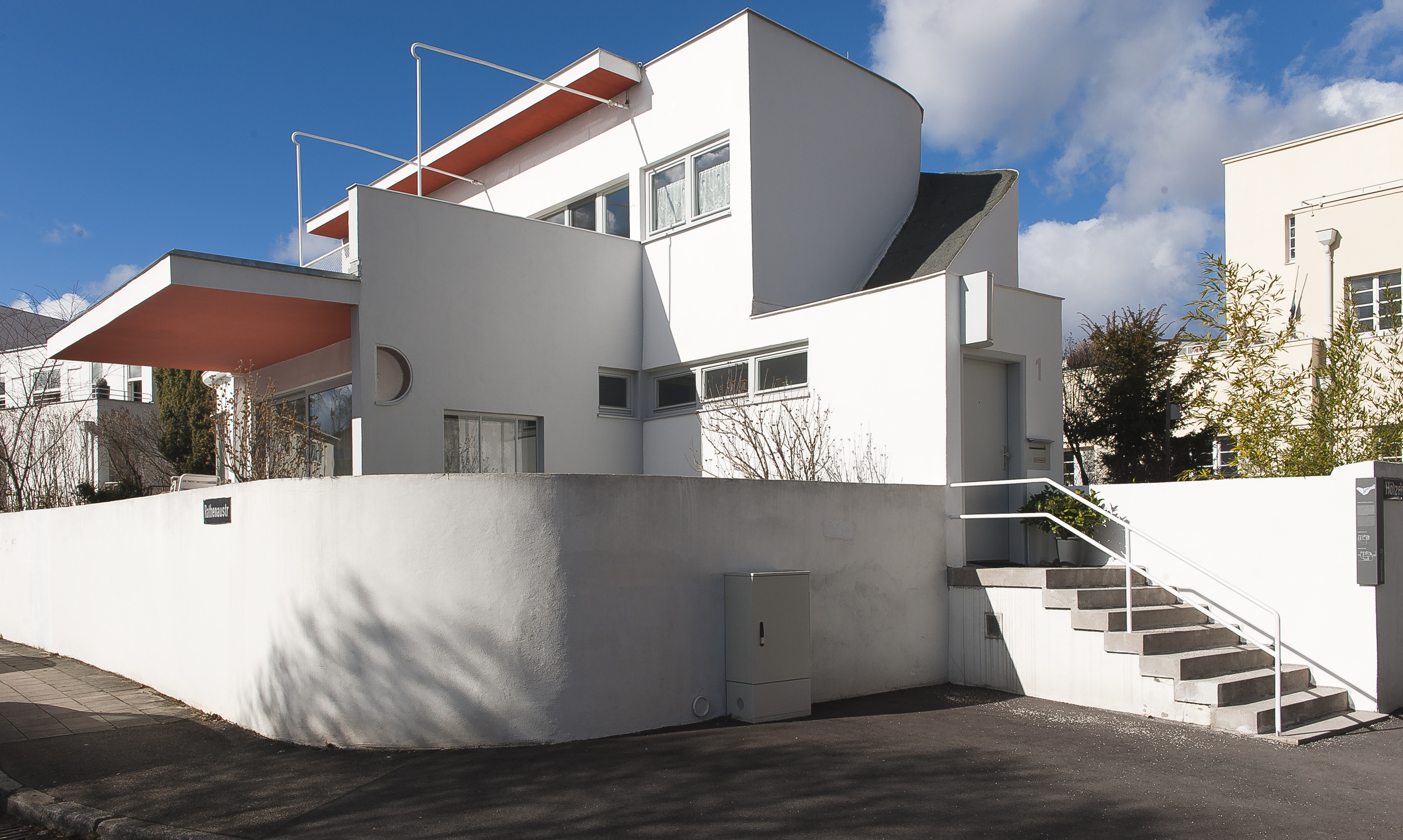
Residential building, Weissenhof Estate, Stuttgart

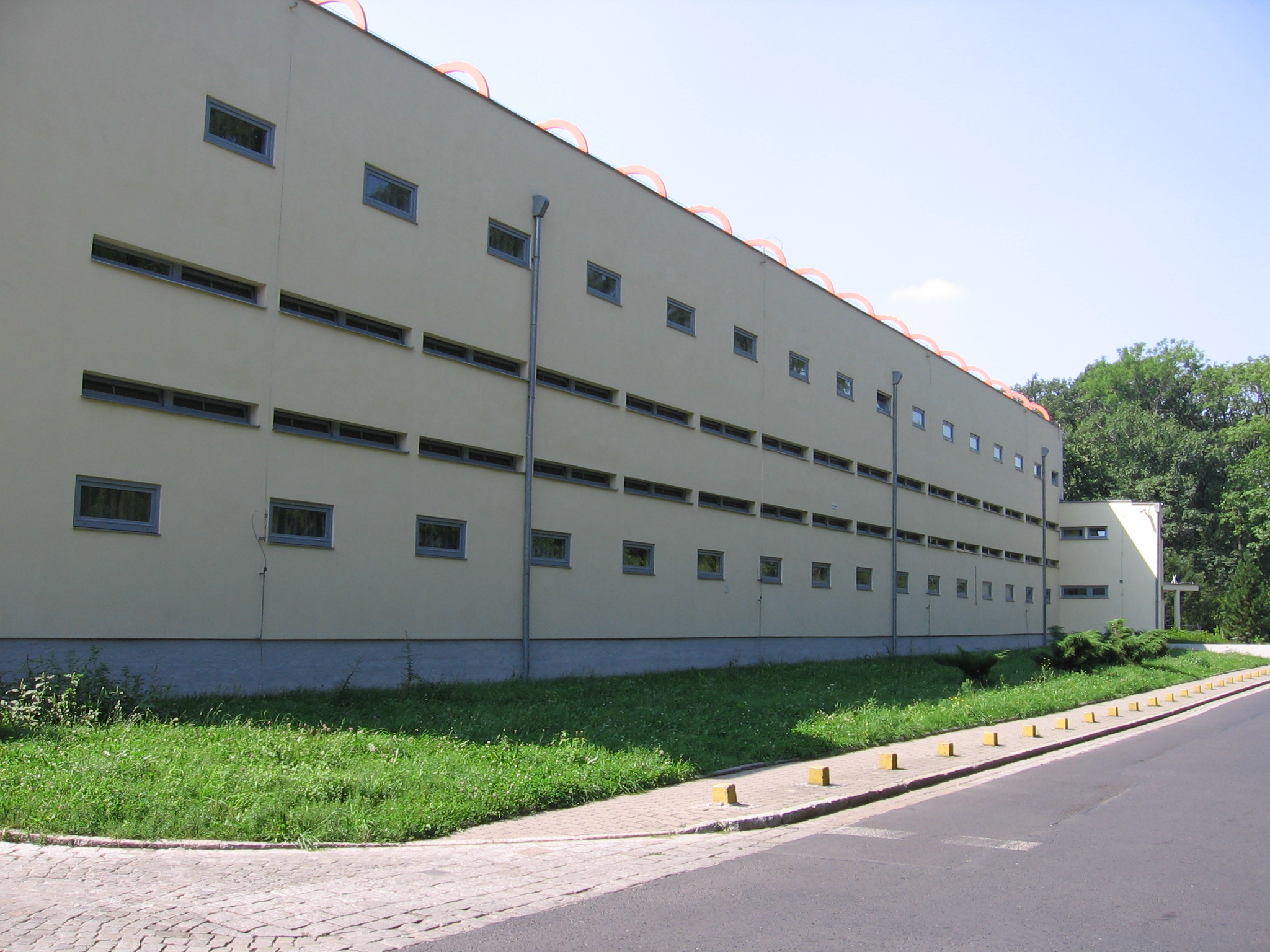
An early work of Scharoun: Hostel in the WuWa-Werkbund exposition in Breslau

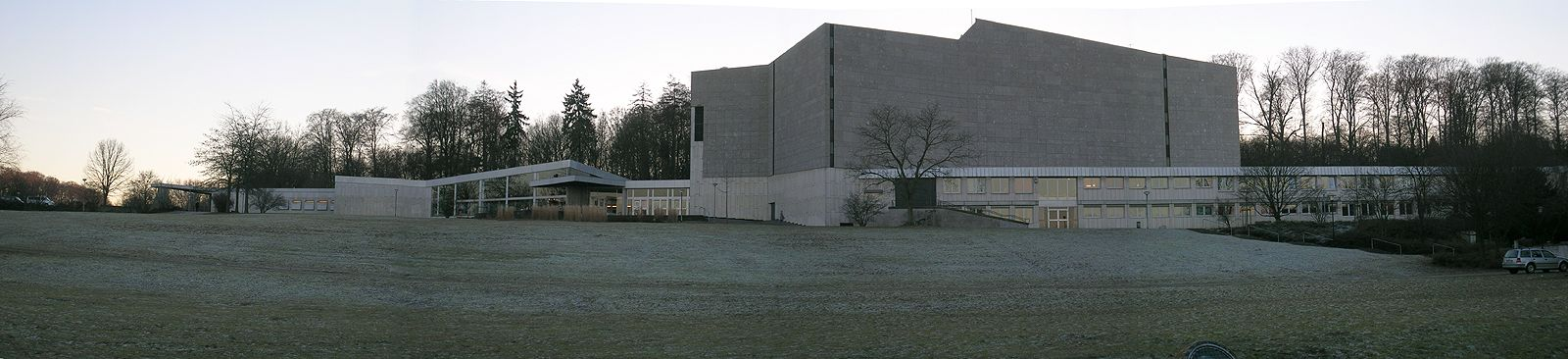
A late work of Scharoun: Theatre in Wolfsburg, opened 1973

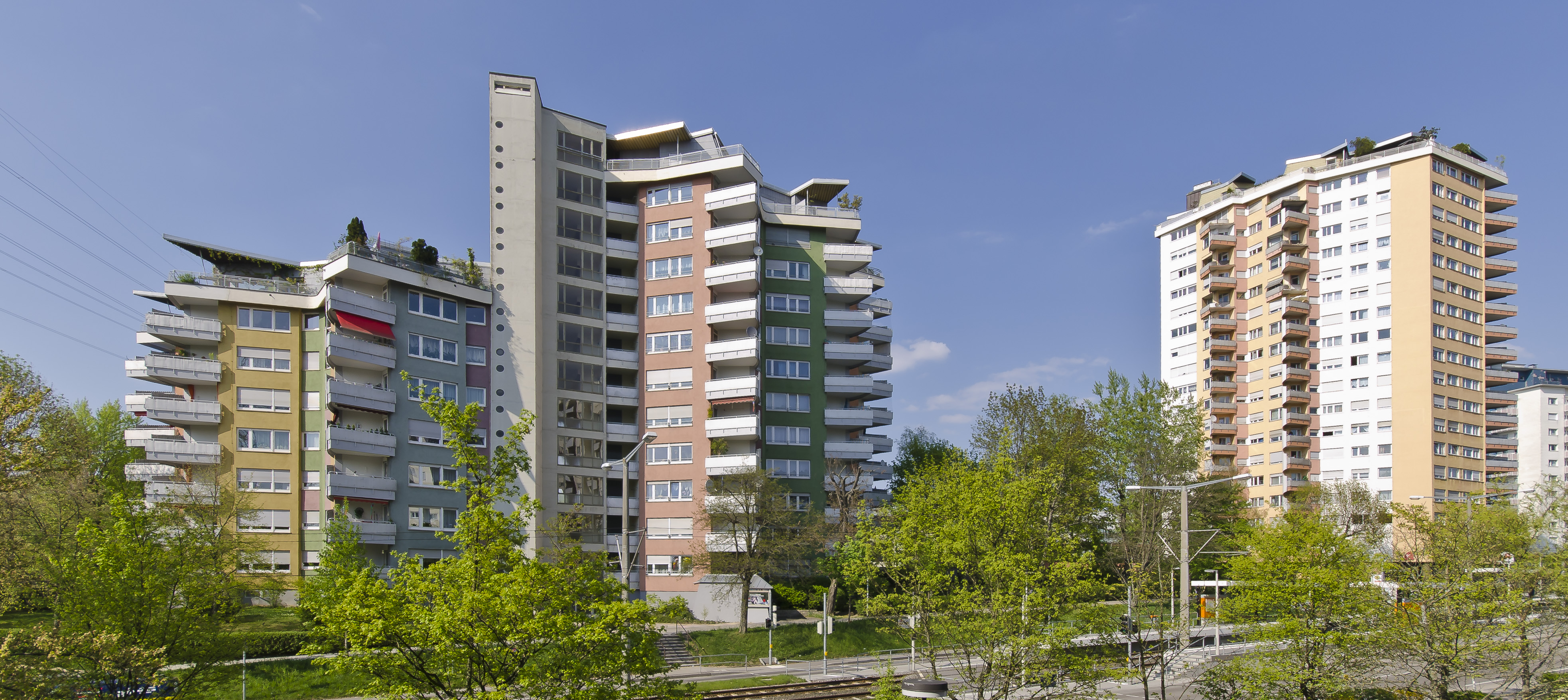
Romeo & Julia, high-rise apartments, Stuttgart-Rot (1954–59)

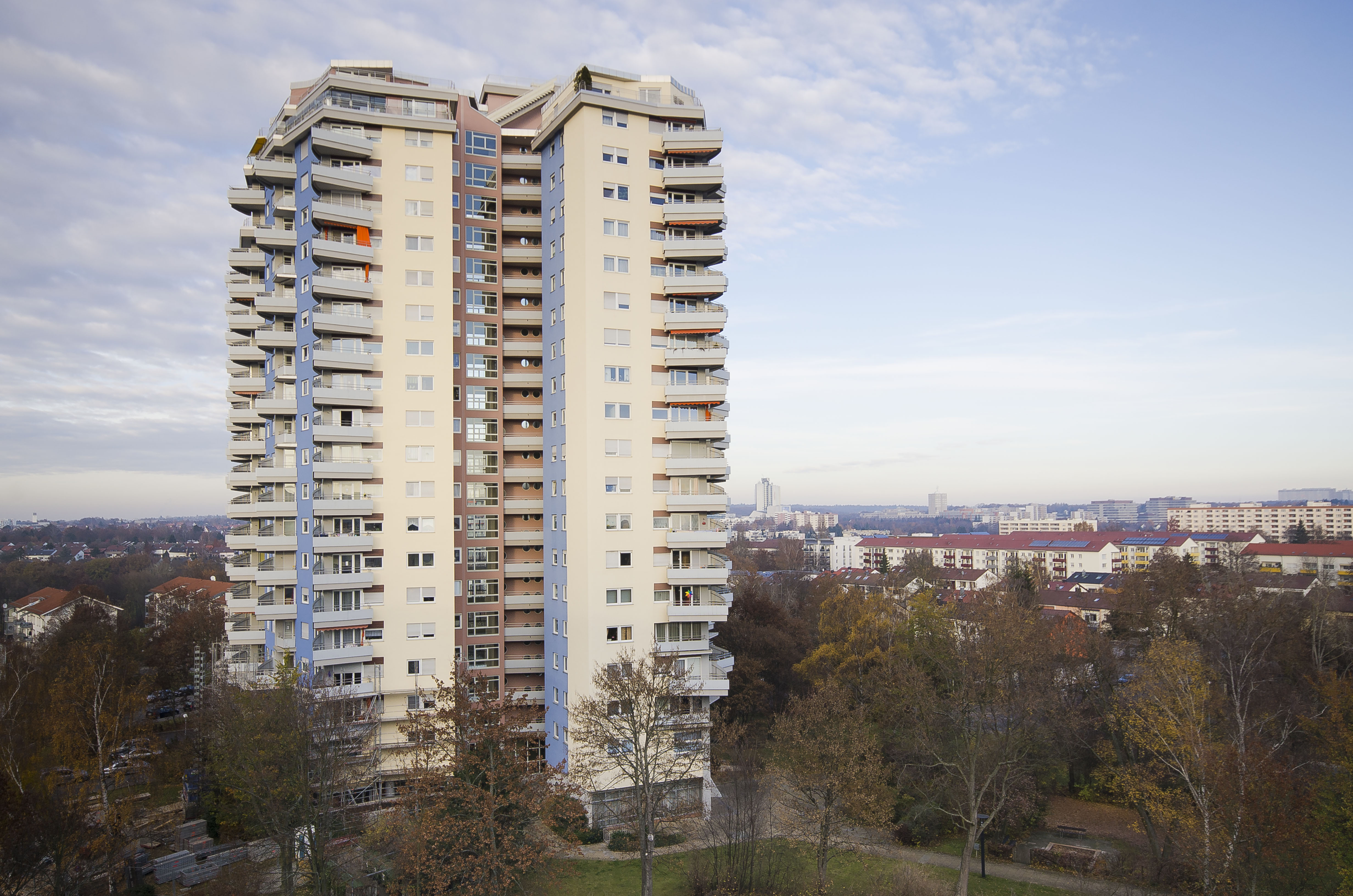
Salute, high-rise apartments, Stuttgart-Fasanenhof (1961–63)

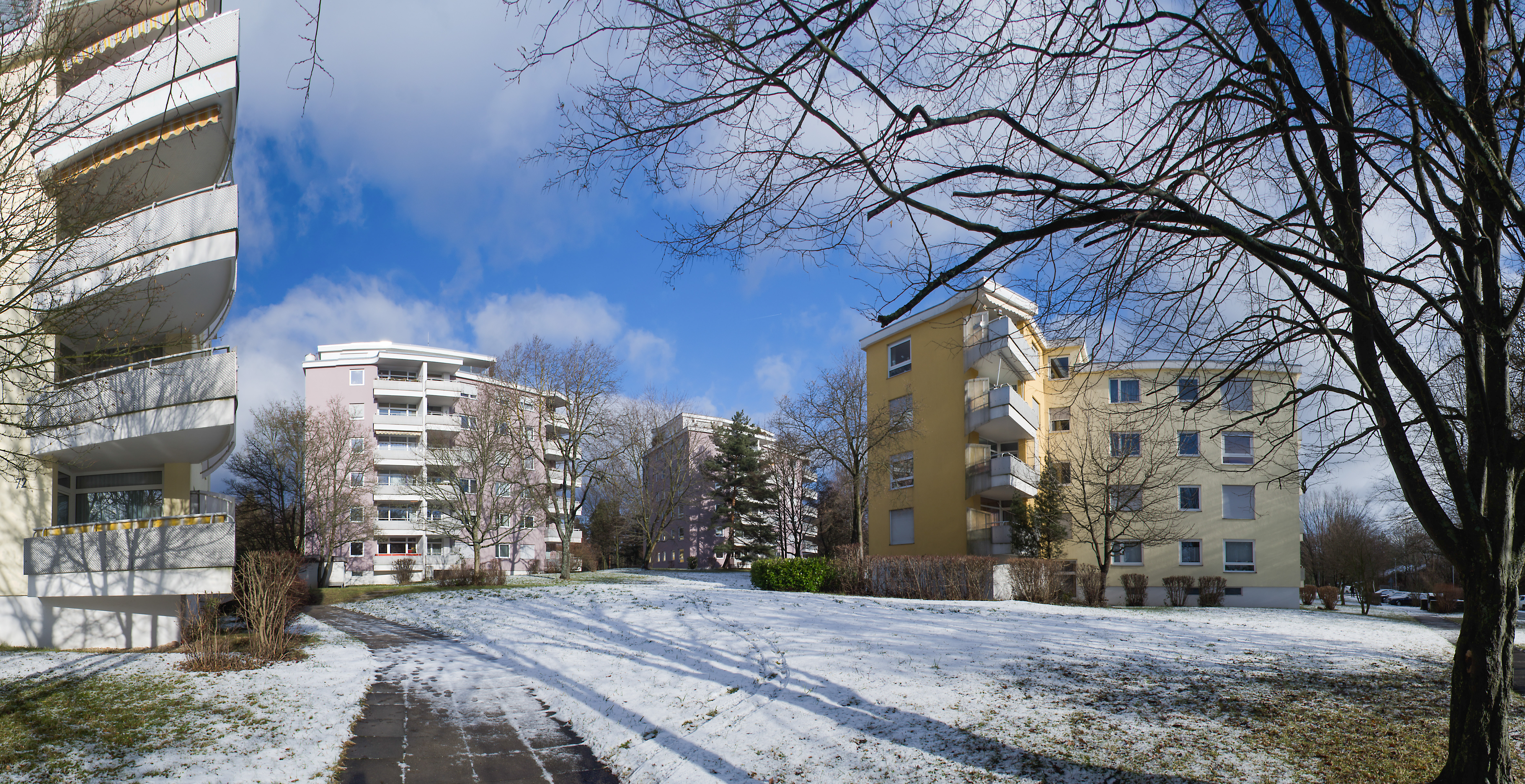
Rauher Kapf, residential district, Böblingen (1965)

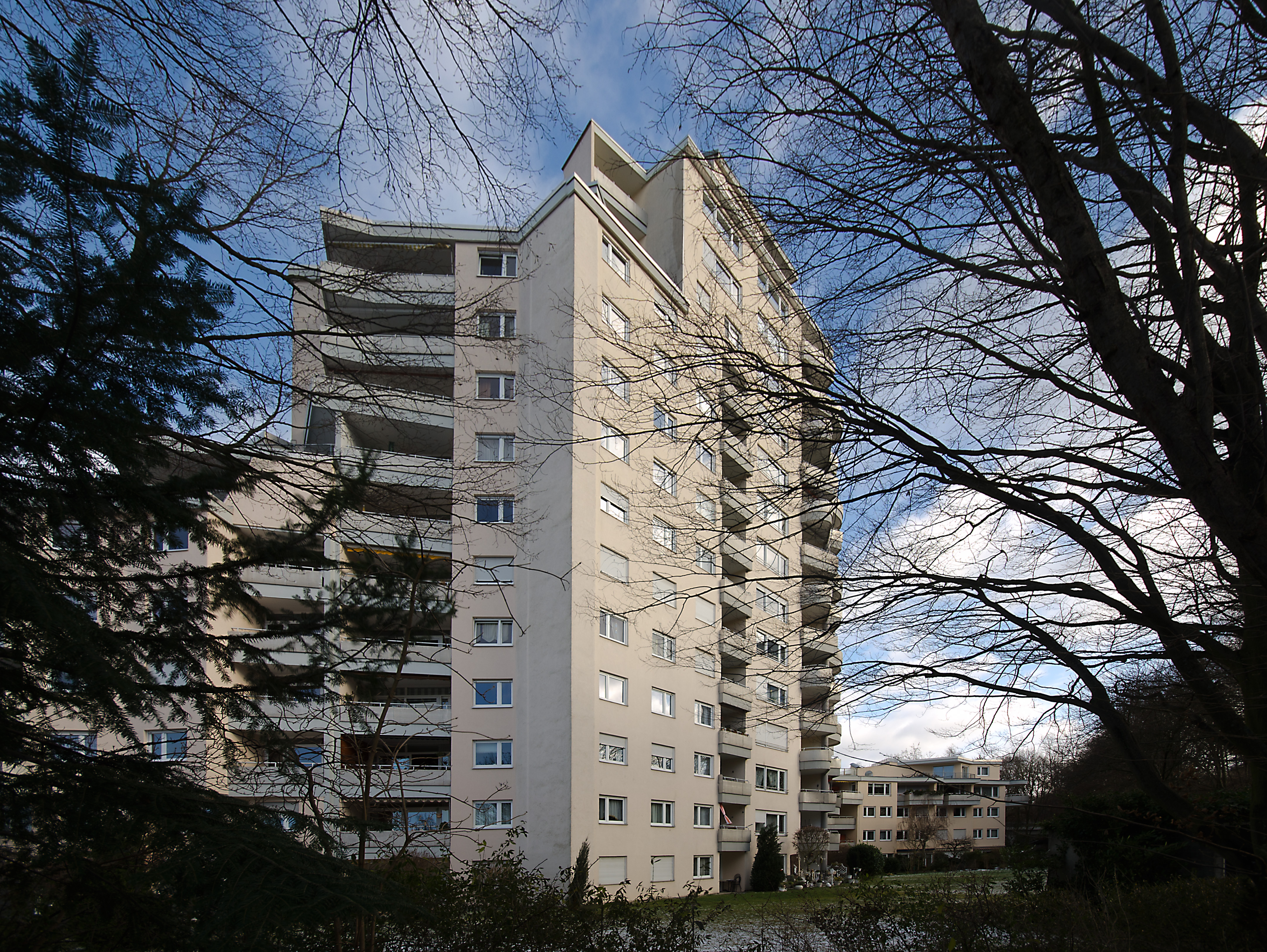
Orplid, high-rise apartments, Böblingen (1971)

=== Buildings (selected) ===
- A house called Die Wohnung (The dwelling) for the Werkbund exhibition at the Weissenhof Estate, Stuttgart, (1927)
- Men's hostel for the Werkbund exhibition called Wohnung und Werkraum (Dwellings and Workspaces), Wrocław, (1929)
- Apartments at Kaiserdamm, Berlin-Charlottenburg, (1928/29)
- Apartments at Hohenzollerndamm, Berlin-Wilmersdorf, (1929/30)
- Town planning and housing design at Großsiedlung Siemensstadt, (1929–31)
- The Schminke house, Löbau/Sachsen, (1933)
- The Baensch house, Berlin-Spandau, (1935)
- The Hoffmeyer house, Bremerhaven, (1935)
- The Moll house, Berlin-Grunewald, (1936)
- The Mohrmann house, Berlin-Lichtenrade, (1939)
- Romeo & Julia, high rise apartments, Stuttgart-Zuffenhausen, (1954–59)
- Charlottenburg-Nord, housing development, Berlin-Charlottenburg, (1955–60)
- Girls School (now a comprehensive school) "Geschwister-Scholl-Schule", Lünen, (1956–62)
- Berliner Philharmonie, Berlin-Tiergarten, (1957–63)
- Salute, high-rise apartments, Stuttgart-Fasanenhof, (1961–63)
- Main and primary school, Marl, (designed in 1960, completed in 1971)
- Institutes of the faculty for architecture of TU-Berlin, (1962–70)
- Rauher Kapf, residential district Böblingen, (1965)
- Orplid, high-rise apartments, Böblingen, (1971)
- Embassy building for the Federal Republic of Germany, Brasília, (1964–71)
- City Theatre, Wolfsburg, (1965–73)
- Deutsches Schifffahrtsmuseum (German maritime museum), Bremerhaven, (1970–75)
- State library, Prussian Cultural Heritage Foundation, Berlin-Tiergarten, (1964–79)

=== Projects (selected) ===
- Competition – Prenzlau Cathedral Square, 1st Prize, (1919)
- Competition – German hygiene museum, Dresden, (1920)
- Competition – Multistorey building at Friedrichstraße station, Berlin, (1922)
- Competition – Münsterplatz Ulm, (1925)
- Competition – Town hall and Exhibition spaces, Bremen, (1928)
- Competition – Liederhalle concert hall, Stuttgart, 1st Prize, (1949)
- Competition – American Memorial Library, Berlin, (1951)
- Design for a primary school, Darmstadt, (1951)
- Competition – Land development, Isle of Helgoland, (1952)
- Competition – Theater, Kassel, 1st Prize, (1952)
- Competition – National Theater, Mannheim, 3rd Prize, (1953)

== Sources ==
- Archiv der Akademie der Künste
- Bestandsübersicht
- Translated from the German Wikipedia page at de:Hans Scharoun

== Bibliography (selected) ==
(in English)

- Bürkle, J. Christoph: "Hans Scharoun", Studio Paperback, Birkhäuser, Basel 1993, ISBN 3-7643-5581-6
- Genovese, Paolo Vincenzo, "Hans Scharoun, Scuola a Lünen", Testo & Immagine, Torino, 2001.
- Jones, Peter Blundell: "Hans Scharoun — a monograph", 1978, ISBN 0-900406-57-7
- Jones, Peter Blundell: "Hans Scharoun", London 1993/1997, ISBN 0-7148-2877-7 (Hardback) ISBN 0-7148-3628-1 (Paperback)
- Jones, Peter Blundell; "Hans Scharoun: Buildings in Berlin", 2002, ISBN 0-9714091-2-9
- Kirschenmann, Jörg C. und Syring, Eberhard: "Hans Scharoun", Taschen Basic Architecture, Taschen, Köln 2004, ISBN 3-8228-2778-9

(in German)

- Barkhofen, Eva-Maria: Hans Scharoun – Architektur auf Papier. Visionen aus vier Jahrzehnten (1909–1945), Berlin Munich 2022, ISBN 978-3-422-98763-0
- Bürkle, J. Christoph: "Hans Scharoun und die Moderne — Ideen, Projekte, Theaterbau", Frankfurt am Main 1986
- Janofske, Eckehard: "Architektur-Räume, Idee und Gestalt bei Hans Scharoun", Braunschweig 1984
- Jones, Peter Blundell: "Hans Scharoun — Eine Monographie", Stuttgart 1980
- Kirschenmann, Jörg C. und Syring, Eberhard: "Hans Scharoun — Die Forderung des Unvollendeten", Deutsche Verlags-Anstalt, Stuttgart 1993, ISBN 3-421-03048-0
- Pfankuch, Peter (Hrsg.): "Hans Scharoun — Bauten, Entwürfe, Texte", Schriftenreihe der Akademie der Künste Band 10, Berlin 1974, Neuauflage 1993, ISBN 3-88331-971-6
- Ruby, Andreas und Ilka: Hans Scharoun. Haus Möller. Köln 2004.
- Syring, Eberhard und Kirschenmann, Jörg C.: "Hans Scharoun — Außenseiter der Moderne", Taschen, Köln 2004, ISBN 3-8228-2449-6
- Wendschuh, Achim (Hrsg.): "Hans Scharoun — Zeichnungen, Aquarelle, Texte", Schriftenreihe der Akademie der Künste Band 22, Berlin 1993, ISBN 3-88331-972-4
- Wisniewski, Edgar: "Die Berliner Philharmonie und ihr Kammermusiksaal. Der Konzertsaal als Zentralraum", Berlin 1993
