= Jan Buys =

Jan Buys may refer to:

- Joannes Busaeus (1547–1611), theologian
- Jan Brandts Buys (1868–1933), composer
- Jan Buijs (1889–1961), architect
