= Douglas Leigh =

American advertising executive and designer (1907–1999)

- Douglas Leigh (r) with Mickey Rooney
- Born: May 24, 1907; Anniston, Alabama, US
- Died: December 14, 1999 (aged 92); New York City, US
- Education: University of Florida
- Known for: Being a pioneer in signage and outdoor advertising

Douglas Leigh (May 24, 1907 – December 14, 1999) was an American advertising executive and lighting designer, and a pioneer in signage and outdoor advertising. He is famous for making New York City's Times Square the site of some of the world's most famous neon signs, or electric billboards. Leigh also designed the colored lighting scheme for the Empire State Building.

== Biography ==
After financing his education at the University of Florida by buying the exclusive right to sell advertising for the yearbook, Leigh became a top salesman for a sign company in Birmingham. In 1929, he moved to New York and got a job at the General Outdoor Advertising Company, but quit in 1933 to strike out on his own.

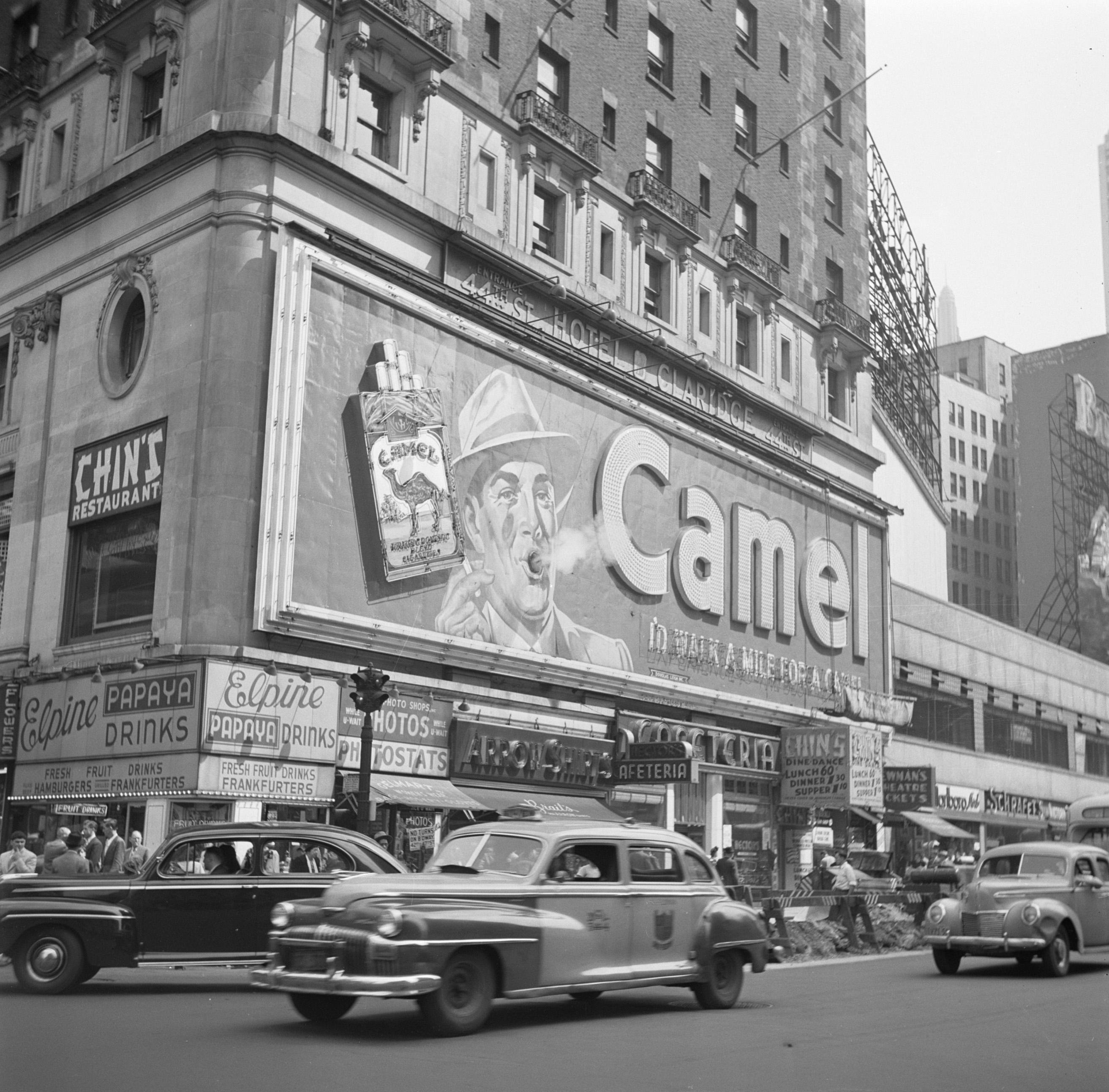
The celebrated smoking Camel cigarette billboard in Times Square was designed by Douglas Leigh and mounted on the Hotel Claridge. (Photo, 1948)

Leigh then designed a sign for the St. Moritz Hotel in exchange for the right to live there and to use the hotel's address at 50 Central Park South for his business. From there, Leigh proceeded to transform the signs at Times Square. His first eye-catching creation was a billboard for A&P, advertising the store's Eight O'Clock Coffee with clouds of steam emanating from a large cup of coffee. A Camel billboard blew smoke rings from a steam generator, while one for Kool cigarettes featured a blinking penguin. One for Ballantine Beer had clowns tossing quoits on a peg.

In 1938, he created a Coca-Cola sign at Columbus Circle that gave an ever-changing weather forecast (featuring a house and pictures of sun, rain, snow, etc.) along with the slogan "Thirst knows no season". (Leigh paid a tenant's weekly laundry bills to stop her from hanging her laundry on her clothesline in front of the sign).

Leigh's design creation of a large illuminated snowflake, which was 17 feet wide by 14 feet tall and had 12,000 crystals, is hung at the intersection of Fifth Avenue and 57th Street every holiday season.

Many of Leigh's creations have been replaced with newer signs, for which Leigh set the bar.

Leigh also lent his talents as a consultant for outdoor displays and spectaculars to Freedomland U.S.A., a New York City theme park, during its 1960 debut. He is featured in the book, Freedomland U.S.A.: The Definitive History (Theme Park Press, 2019).

He was the step-grandfather of Prince Lorenzo Borghese.
