= Jan Buijs =

Dutch architect (1889–1961)

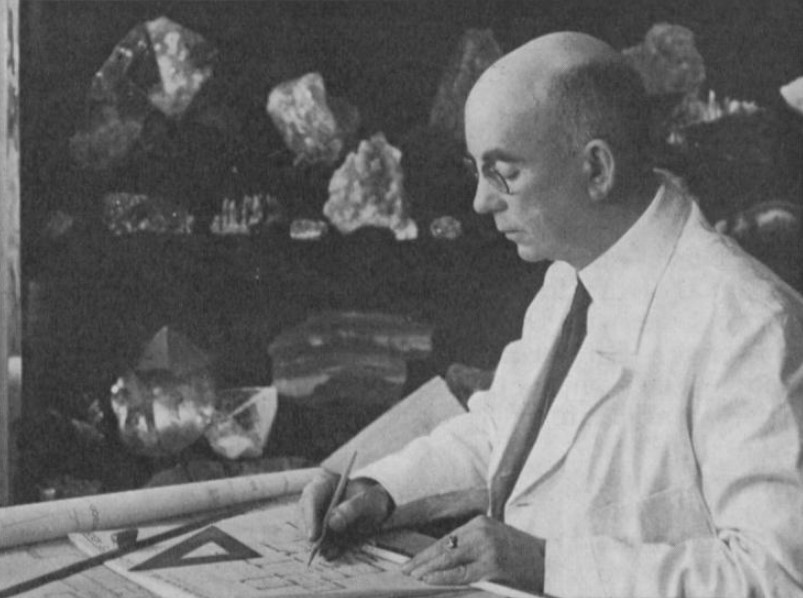
Jan Willem Eduard Buijs, ca. 1938

Jan Willem Eduard Buijs, sometimes written Jan Buys (26 August 1889 – 19 October 1961) was a Dutch architect, best known for his De Volharding Building. His works include manufacturing, commercial, residential and municipal buildings. Stylistically, they usually combine New Objectivist and De Stijl features, and in his interiors, a Bauhaus approach.

== Life and career ==
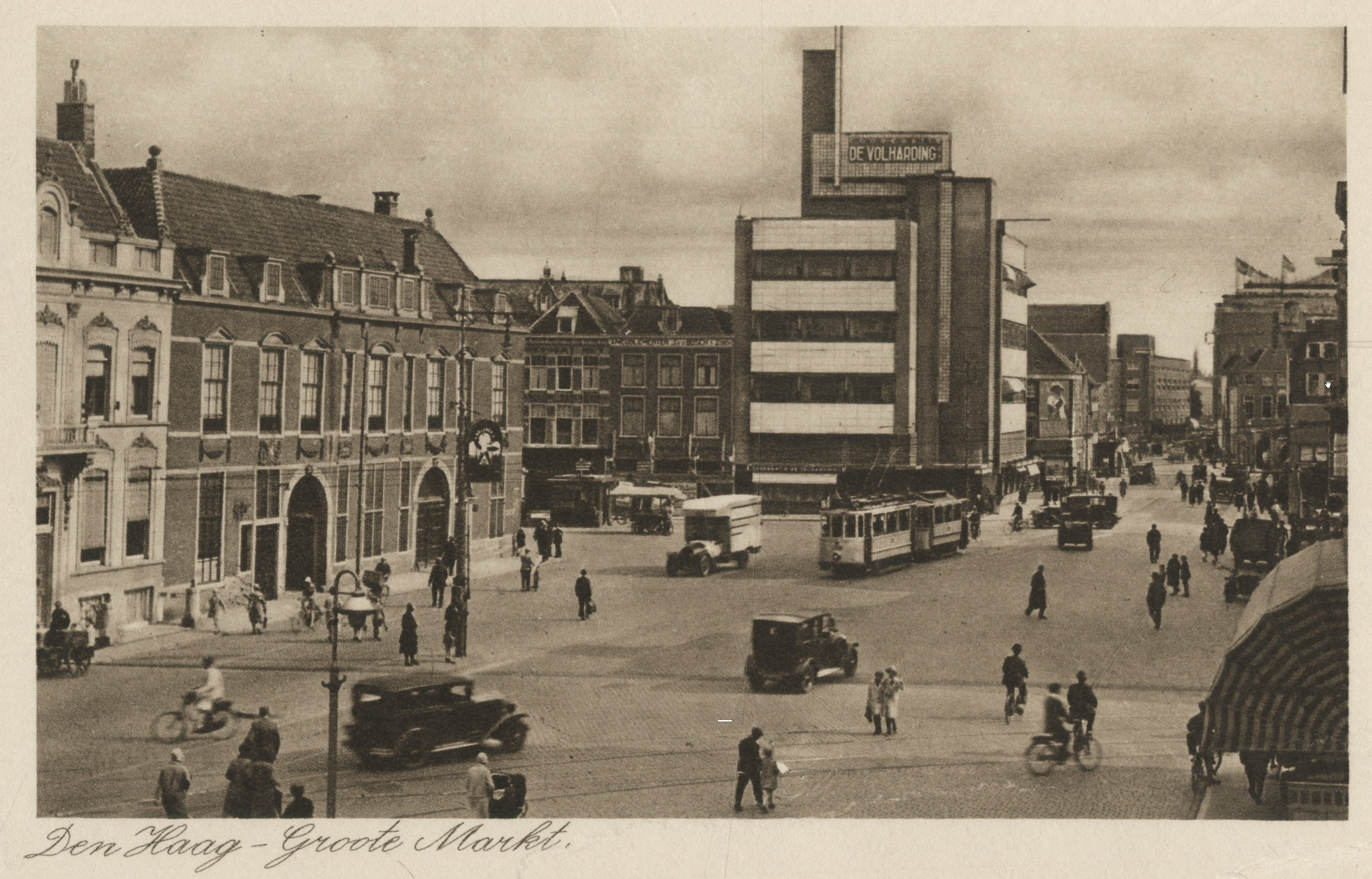
Mid-1930s view of the Grote Markt (The Hague) with Jan Buijs' De Volharding Building (1928)

Buijs' parents were Willem Roeland Buijs, an engineer, and Georgina Catherine Antoinette Kuypers. He was born and raised in Surakarta and attended the hogere burgerschool there before moving with his family back to the Netherlands in 1908. In 1909 he entered the Technical College at Delft (now the Delft University of Technology) to study architectural engineering.

After graduating in 1919, he was engaged on the recommendation of Ad van der Steur as assistant architect in the Department of Public Works of the municipality of Haarlem. Among other work of this period is the Stedelijk Gymnasium, the city gymnasium or Latin School (1923–24). He also designed a number of private residences, mostly in The Hague and Wassenaar.

In 1924, Buijs formed the private architectural firm of Buijs and Lürsen in The Hague with Joan Lürsen, with whom he had become acquainted in Haarlem. Buijs was the designer and Lürsen oversaw construction. In addition to the commercial buildings for which he is known, he continued to design private residences, mostly in The Hague, Wassenaar and Voorschoten. After the Second World War, during which he suffered badly from depression, his work included a number of factories, and blocks of flats in The Hague and Vlaardingen. His unbuilt designs include the Free School in the Hague during the 1920s and the Troelstra mausoleum and the Academy of Fine Arts in the Hague in the 1930s. During the war he also produced a master plan for arts institutions in The Hague, but Willem Marinus Dudok's plan was adopted instead.

Buijs retired in 1955 because of poor health. His last buildings included several private residences and two office buildings in The Hague: for Het Nederlandsch Rundvee-stamboek (1951–52) and the Hoofdproduktschap van Akkerbouwprodukten (1953–55). He died in The Hague, aged 72. Lürsen continued the firm with a new partner, A. van Haaren, before retiring in 1974.

Buijs was a member of the socialist Social Democratic Workers' Party, but his political activities were confined to the arts: he taught art and architecture to workers' children and went with them to visit museums. He encouraged young artists and commissioned art works for his buildings, in particular a now lost relief by Rudolf Belling on the wall above the staircase in the De Volharding Building. He collected modern art and also had a collection of crystals, which he displayed under carefully planned lighting.

Stylistically, Buijs' buildings usually combine De Stijl and New Objectivist approaches. He gave slide presentations on modern architecture, in which most of his examples were German. In his interiors, he preferred an approach reminiscent of the Bauhaus, with unadorned, modern furnishings in gleaming metal; he was one of the first in the Netherlands to use Marcel Breuer steel furniture.

== Notable buildings ==
=== Rudolf Steiner Clinic, The Hague ===
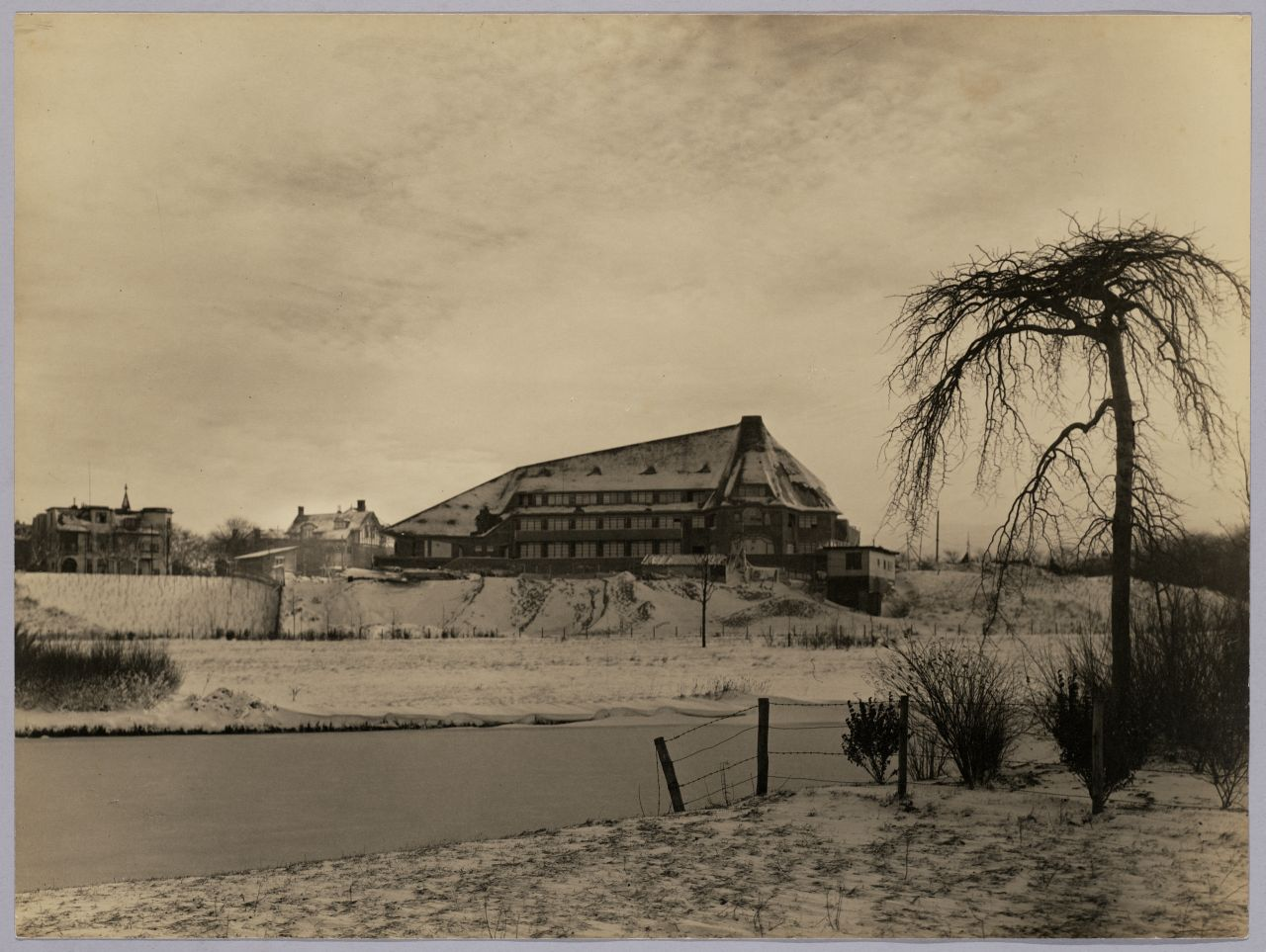
Rudolf Steiner Clinic in 1926

Buijs carried out the commission to build the clinic (1926–28) based on Rudolf Steiner's own architectural ideas; he studied Steiner's Goetheanum for a month before designing it. The building is "unornamented, almost animistic" and uncharacteristic of Buijs.

=== De Volharding Building, The Hague ===
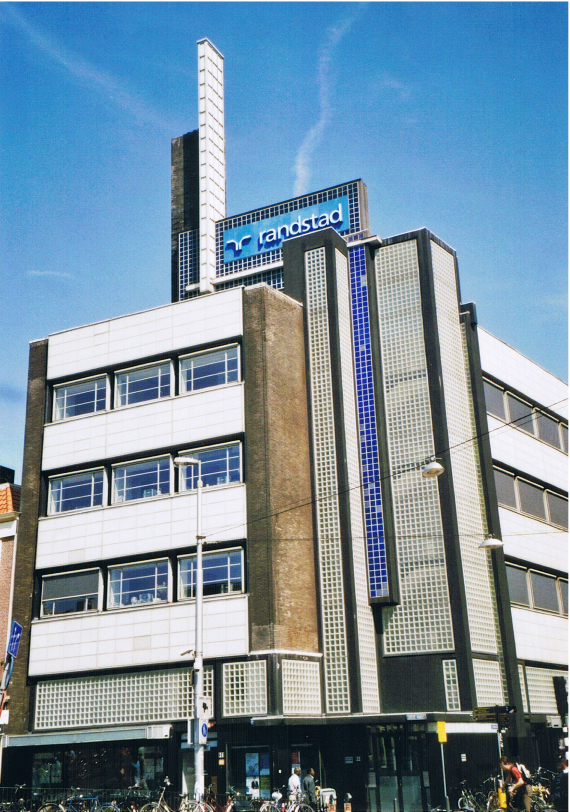
De Volharding Building, 2009

Built for a workers' cooperative by that name and designed to house shops, storage for products and a dental clinic as well as offices, the De Volharding (Persistence) Building (1927–28) is De Stijl or cubistic in conception, influenced also by Russian Constructivism, and clad entirely in glass. A light tower rises from the roof above a large sign which bore the name of the cooperative; these are in white, yellow and blue glass, the blue extending downwards to form a divider between the lift tower and the staircase tower, which consist of glass bricks, as does the strip above the ground-floor windows. The remainder of the façade consists of ribbon windows separated by opal glass spandrels, which can be reached from gangways and had lettering mounted behind the glass advertising the benefits of membership. In response to the client's requirement that he include as much advertising space as possible, Buijs designed a building the entirety of which advertised both the organisation and the cooperative movement itself. It was "a city-scale luminescent sculpture", an internationally famous example of architecture of the night, "[p]robably the most frequently cited example for the potential applications of a future 'light architecture' in 1920s Europe", referred to in 1935 as "the most famous of all luminous buildings". However, it was criticised by some in the modern movement for combining expressionist elements and thus not being entirely devoid of ornamentation. The building inspired the design of Boston Manor tube station which opened in 1934 on the London Underground, and imitates the illuminated tower.

Except for partial illumination of one side in 1966 for the National Week of Architecture in the Netherlands, the building has not been illuminated since a few years after it was built; the exterior was altered in 1933 and 1938 and in 1974 it was renovated as an office building. Since 1988, it has been owned by Randstad Uitzendbureau (Randstad Employment Agency).

=== De Arbeiderspers Building, Amsterdam ===
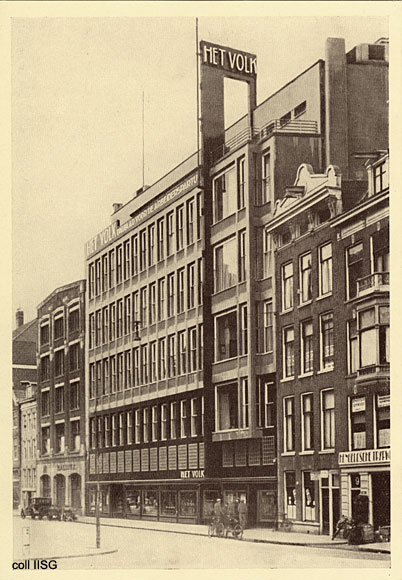
De Arbeiderspers Building, photographed in 1930

This headquarters building for the socialist De Arbeiderspers (The Worker's Press) (1929–31) is in New Objectivist style. The managing director of the company pronounced it "a building of truly impressive beauty" partly because the façade "in accordance with the stated requirements ... has no 'ornamentation' other than an extension to be used for advertising. This façade has no other pretension than being the front of a building in which work is done". However, the Amsterdam Beauty Commission objected to the building on stylistic grounds. It was Buijs' favourite of his works, perhaps because in it he was able to explicitly articulate his viewpoint as a socialist architect by building a "cathedral of labour". The building, known as 'the red fortress', was demolished in 1972.

=== C. J. Leembruggen residence, The Hague ===
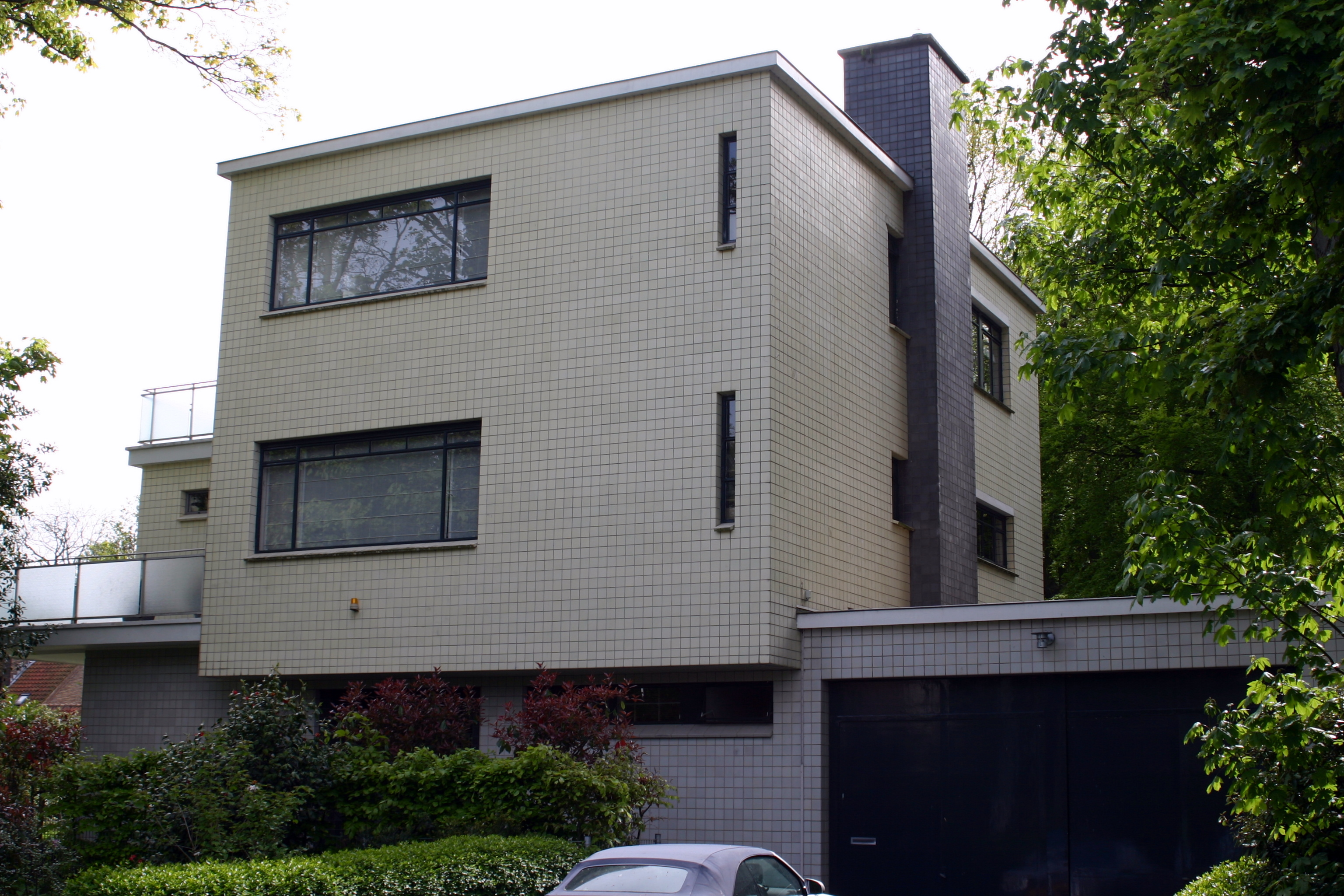
C. J. Leembruggen residence

This private residence built in 1935–36 is radically Objectivist in external style, with a striking interplay of rectangular forms and voids, a facade clad in yellow and grey glazed tiles, many balconies and a roof terrace, but conventional in interior layout.

== Sources ==
- Jan W. E. Buijs and Joan B. Lürsen. N.V. Drukkerij en Uitgeversmaatschappij De Arbeiderspers: 42 fotografische beelden uit het nieuwe gebouw. Amsterdam: De Arbeiderspers, circa 1932. (in Dutch)
- Chris Rehorst. Jan Buijs: interieurs (1889–1961). Monografieën van Nederlandse interieurarchitecten 9. Rotterdam: Uitgeverij 010, 1991. ISBN 978-90-6450-127-2 (in Dutch)
