= Die Stadtkrone =

Concept of urban planning

Die Stadtkrone or City Crown is a concept of urban planning put forward by German expressionist architects, and particularly championed by Bruno Taut in the early part of the 20th century. Taut made the concept into the title of his book published in 1919.

Taut's idea was to establish a garden city with an intellectual and artist city center beyond the concentration of cultural institutions. He suggested creating a representation of the city and its citizens in a virtually religious idealization, comparable to a gothic cathedral of Asian pagodas. He even proposed specific measurements for this ideal city: "A circle with a diameter of approximately seven kilometres encompasses the entire city and its 'city crown' is placed at the centre. This crown is a rectangular area of 800 x 500 metres."
