= Paul Byard =

American architect

Paul Spencer Byard (August 30, 1939 – July 15, 2008) was an American lawyer and architect. He was born in New York to Dever Spencer Byard, a lawyer, and Margaret Mather Byard, a teacher of English Literature at Columbia University. Byard graduated from Milton Academy in Massachusetts in 1957, from Yale College in 1961 and went on to receive degrees from Clare College, Cambridge, Harvard Law School, and from Columbia University's Graduate School of Architecture.

== Law career ==
In 1966, having completed law school, Byard joined the law firm of Winthrop & Stimson, where he remained for three years. He also acted as general counsel to the Roosevelt Island Development Corporation and as an associate counsel to the New York State Urban Development Corporation. Combining law with architecture, Byard supported the legal defense of the New York City Landmarks Preservation Law.

== Architecture career ==
In 1977, after Byard received an architectural degree from the Graduate School of Architecture and Planning at Columbia University, he joined James Stewart Polshek & Associates. In 1981, he was made a partner in the firm. In 1989, Byard joined Charles A. Platt Partners (later known as Platt Byard Dovell White).

While working as an architect, Byard was involved in the renovations of Carnegie Hall, the old Custom House on Bowling Green, the State Supreme Court’s Appellate Division Courthouse on Madison Square, the Cooper Union Foundation Building, and the Villard Houses. He also helped to design the New 42nd Street Studios, the Channel 57 building, and a mausoleum and columbarium at Green-Wood Cemetery in Brooklyn, all of which were of contemporary design. Byard was highly involved in the Architectural League of New York and served as president from 1989 to 1994.

While working as an architect, Byard wrote The Architecture of Additions: Design and Regulation (W.W. Norton, 1998), in which he discusses the renovations of many historic buildings and exhibits his knowledge of blending old and new styles of architecture. At the time of his death, Byard was working on a book to be entitled Why Save This Building? The Public Interest in Architectural Meaning.

In keeping with his architectural interests, Byard directed the historic preservation program at Columbia for ten years until his death. He also developed a third-year studio and workshop for architecture and preservation students.

== Personal life and death ==
Byard married Rosalie Starr Warren in 1965 and had two children. He lived in Prospect Heights, Brooklyn, where he died on July 15, 2008, of cancer.

== See also ==
- Architectural League of New York
