= Walter D'Arcy Ryan =

American lighting engineer and inventor

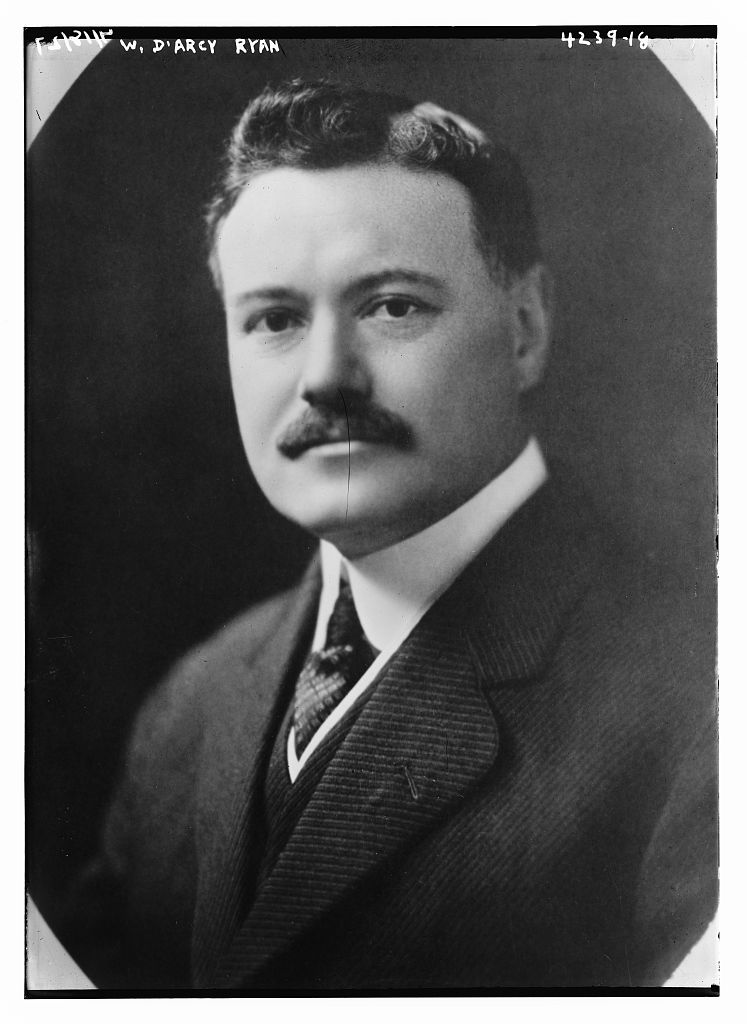
- Ryan in 1917
- Born: April 17, 1870; Kentville, Nova Scotia, Canada
- Died: March 14, 1934 (aged 63); Schenectady, New York, US
- Employer: Lighting engineer
- Organization: General Electric

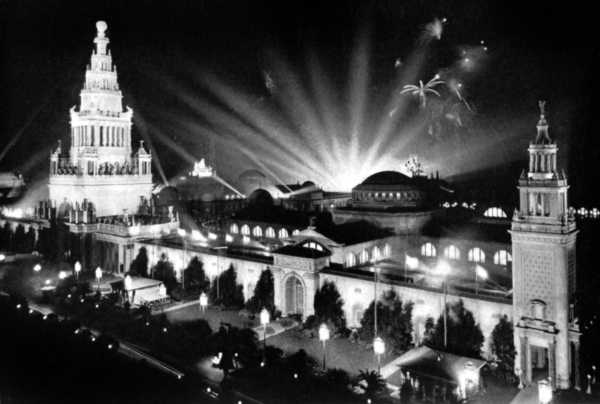
Lighting at the Panama–Pacific International Exposition, 1915, designed by Ryan, including the Scintillator searchlight display

Walter D'Arcy Ryan (Kentville, Nova Scotia, Canada, April 17, 1870 – Schenectady, New York, US, March 14, 1934) was an influential early lighting engineer who worked for General Electric as director of its Illuminating Engineering Laboratory. He pioneered skyscraper illumination, designed the Scintillator colored searchlights display, and was responsible for the lighting of the Panama–Pacific International Exposition in San Francisco and the Century of Progress Exposition in Chicago, in addition to the first complete illumination of Niagara Falls. He combined illumination into both an art and a science.

== Early life and career ==
Ryan was born in Kentville, Nova Scotia, and educated in Canada for a military career, but instead emigrated to the United States around 1890. He worked for General Electric in Lynn, Massachusetts, and was rapidly promoted and put in charge of the Commercial Department, which developed into the Illuminating Engineering Laboratory, the world's first institution for research into lighting; this was formally established around 1908 in Schenectady, New York, with him at its head. He and his team developed and patented much of the technology for lighting applications, including the Ryan-Lite reflector-equipped headlamp.

In particular, under Ryan the Illuminating Engineering Laboratory developed Schenectady's White Way. Ryan described it as a way to provide "cosmopolitan atmosphere and dignified aesthetic effects".

== Development of lighting as spectacle ==
In 1908, with Charles G. Armstrong, Ryan was responsible for the first illumination of an entire skyscraper: the new tower of the Singer Building on lower Broadway in New York City was lighted from the base to the 35th floor with arc searchlights, while the top of the tower was outlined with 1,600 incandescent bulbs, the technique that had been used to illuminate buildings up to that time. The illumination, which was planned when the building was designed, was bright enough for colors to be visible, but was patchy; Singer used retouched photographs for advertising. He later illuminated other skyscrapers, in particular in 1912 the General Electric Company Building in Buffalo, New York, which he lighted with arc searchlights and a revolving searchlight in changing colors on the top of the tower; this scheme prefigured the colored floodlighting of skyscrapers and Ryan's own work for the Panama–Pacific International Exposition three years later. Ryan was also responsible for lighting the interior of that building.

Ryan was in charge of lighting for the New York Hudson-Fulton Celebration of 1909, and for this lighted up all the major buildings, East River bridges, public places, and some stretches of the coastline of Manhattan. He installed colored searchlights on the Singer Building. The tower was reportedly visible from 40 miles away, and made a great impression:

[W]hat every one of the visitors paused to gaze at was the Singer Building tower ... The main building was dark and gloomy, but from its center sprang a terra-cotta shaft set off with pale green pilasters rising to a golden cornice. The lights which illuminated it could not be seen, but it glowed against the sky.

Ryan also made use of searchlights for non-architectural display, in the Scintillator, sometimes called the Ryan Scintillator. This consisted of searchlights equipped with color filters and refracted through steam; the beams of light were also made to form different shapes, including a peacock's tail and a sunrise. It was on display at the Hudson-Fulton Celebration, with shows twice nightly at Riverside Drive and 155th Street.

Forty huge searchlights of varying color shot enormous beams high in the air, now radiating in fan-like effect and changing from intensest white to the softer greens and yellows; now again shifting bodily from east to west and back again with frightful speed.

The steam was supplied by a 200-horsepower boiler, and black powder and smoke bombs were also used.

For 30 nights in a row in 1907, he used 44 searchlights with colored filters, a form of the Scintillator, to illuminate the entirety of Niagara Falls for the first time. The New York Tribune reported: "Presently the whole great stretch of the Falls was a mass of color; the whirling water beneath was like a pool of flame in the glow of the red searchlights."

In 1915, Ryan was the lighting designer for the San Francisco Panama–Pacific International Exposition. This marked the first widespread use of floodlighting at a fair, and also the first use of high-pressure gas mantle lamps and of high-wattage tungsten filament lamps. Previous expositions had used outline lighting with strings of incandescent bulbs and, more recently, arc lamps; Ryan restricted these to the "Joy Zone" (the midway) and also used screens, filters, and reflecting to manipulate the floodlights. The exhibition buildings were arranged around courtyards, as had become standard; a different color was used for each, down to guards' uniforms, trashcans and sand. Ryan floodlit the facades at night with increasing intensity higher up the towers, and used different colors in each courtyard. The centerpiece of the fair was the Tower of Jewels, 435 feet tall and covered with 102,000 suspended, mirror-backed Austrian cut-glass prisms, some colored and some clear, which refracted sunlight by day and reflected 54 searchlight beams by night. Two buildings were lit from within at night, one of them an "Electric Kaleidoscope" created by a circle of 12 moving floodlight beams aimed upwards at the glass dome of the Palace of Horticulture. Ryan carefully concealed both exterior floodlights and the red incandescent bulbs used to pick out architectural details, in order to avoid shadows and eye fatigue. He also phased in the night-time lighting at dusk rather than abruptly turning the lights on as had previously been done. The ambient lighting was intended to be beautiful and intimate, while three times a week, Scintillators created awe-inspiring overhead effects on themes such as "Scotch Plaid, Ghost Dance, and Fighting Serpents". In an article on the exposition for General Electric Review, Ryan himself wrote of the atmosphere he intended to create:

Soft radiant energy is everywhere; lights and shadows abound, fire spits from the mouths of serpents into the flaming gas cauldrons and sends its flickering rays over the composite Spanish-Gothic-Oriental grandeur. Mysterious vapors rise from steam-electric cauldrons and also from the beautiful central fountain group symbolizing the Earth in formation.

The floodlighting was cheaper to install, maintain, and power than the festoons of electric bulbs, and allowed both artistic effects with shimmering light, accents, and contrasts with dark surroundings, and realism, including the highlighting of architectural details. This fair set the pattern for the lighting of future fairs.

Almost twenty years later, in 1933, Ryan was also the lighting designer for Chicago's Century of Progress Exposition, which again was notable for its lighting innovation. To match the art moderne architecture, Ryan used the new electric gaseous discharge lamps, especially neon (over 75,000 feet of neon tubing in addition to more than 15,000 incandescent lamps). The fair was conceived of in large part as a lighting display; building surfaces were brightly colored, smooth, and shiny with few openings, for optimum reflectivity, and the fair opened at night (with a fireworks display ignited by light from the star Arcturus that had originated at the time of the previous Chicago World's Fair, converted into an electrical pulse by a photo-electric cell). The exterior lighting required 3,000 kilowatts of power; the General Electric building had a simulated waterfall on its side that alone required 5,000 feet of blue tube lighting. But the use of new technology enabled Ryan to obtain the maximum amount of light for the fair's limited funds. Scintillators were used again, with smoke effects from the fireworks, but this time the modern lighting fixtures were placed in full view. The largest electric incandescent filament lamp in the world, 50 kilowatts, was on display. For its second year, in 1934, the illumination was increased by about half, and the Ford Building had a Pillar of Light created by 24 searchlights projecting a mile into the sky. The closing program for the exposition on October 31, 1934, was titled "The Festival of Illumination: The Apotheosis of Man-Made Light." Again, the fair was influential: the expositions at Dallas and Cleveland the following year both emulated both the architecture and the lighting of the Chicago fair.

== Later life ==
In June 1932, Ryan became a consulting engineer for General Electric; he died on March 14, 1934, after a heart attack.
