= Carl Krayl =

German painter

Carl Christian Krayl (17 April 1890 – 1 April 1947) was a German architect and artist of the early twentieth century, who was associated with several of the leading avant-garde art movements of German Expressionism.

Krayl was born in Weinsberg, and educated at the school of applied arts and the technical college of Stuttgart. He began his career working for architects in Nuremberg and Freiburg. He did technical work in Ingolstadt during World War I.

In the years immediately after the War, Krayl was involved with the Arbeitsrat für Kunst, the November Group, the Glass Chain, and Der Ring, along with Walter Gropius, Bruno Taut, and other members of the Expressionist movement. Krayl's paintings and drawings from this period are richly imaginative and visionary, with titles like "Cosmic building," "Dream city," and "Light greetings from my star house."

Krayl was one of the architects interested in the possibilities of the "glass architecture" advocated by the writer Paul Scheerbart. In 1920 Krayl began designing "suspended and swinging architecture," a feature of Scheerbart's 1914 novel The Gray Cloth. Krayl designed a "Crystaline Star House" that hung from the side of a cliff. Krayl also wrote a series of articles that were published in Taut's journal Frühlicht ("Daybreak").

Simultaneously, Krayl worked in the practical and pragmatic side of architecture. He held a position on the board of works for the city of Magdeburg from 1921 to 1938. He designed buildings that were constructed in Magdeburg and elsewhere, including the health insurance building in Magdeburg, a union office, and apartment buildings. In the 1921–1924 years, Krayl was Bruno Taut's assistant while Taut was the city architect in Magdeburg; together they executed a program of facade painting to alleviate the grimness of urban architecture. (The Constructivist artist Ilya Ehrenburg saw their work in 1922, and criticized it for "its disproportion and dadaistic hysteria.")

In 1933, when the Nazi regime came to power, Krayl was accused of being a Bolshevik (a false charge). As a result, he was unemployed as an architect through 1937. From 1938 to 1946 he worked as a draftsman for the national railway. He died in Werder (Havel) in 1947.

"We want to look into the distant future and show what is to come...." — Carl Krayl to Walter Gropius, 1919.
