= Der Ring =

Der Ring was an architectural collective founded in 1926 in Berlin. It emerged from expressionist architecture with a functionalist agenda. Der Ring was a group of young architects, formed with the objective of promoting Modernist architecture.It took a position against the prevailing architecture of the time, Historicism. With the rise of National Socialism and the increasing difficulty between Hugo Häring and the other members, Der Ring dissolved in 1933.

In the meantime the German architects whose work follows newly discovered laws of design, have founded a new association. 'The Ring' — a figure of self-contained form without a head — unites a group of like-minded people to pursue their ideals in unison.

— The magazine Die Form in issue No. 10, 1926

Besides the search for a new beginning in building design, the members of the "Ring" were looking for new ways of building. Unlike other groups, be they of the time or before the time like the Glass Chain or the Arbeitsrat für Kunst, they did not have an elaborated programme, that would have provided them with an ideological background. The members often had different attitudes when faced with tasks. Häring and Scharoun rather followed an "organic functionalism" whereas Mies and Gropius were more interested in the possibilities of industrial building.

These different attitudes were reflected in the planning of large scale planned communities of the time, in which the members of the Ring were participating. Six members, Bartning, Forbat, Gropius, Häring, Henning und Scharoun, were part of the project of Siemensstadt in Berlin (1929 through 1931).Some of them later became leading members in the Deutscher Werkbund. Ten of them took part with their buildings in the exhibition of the Werkbund, "Die Wohnung" in Stuttgart-Weißenhof (Weißenhofsiedlung), which was organised by Mies, who had been chairman of the Werkbund since 1926.

The driving force behind the founding of the Ring were Hugo Häring and Ludwig Mies van der Rohe who shared an office in Berlin at the time. Both were already members of the Zehner-Ring (Ring of Ten), that was founded two years before with similar aims. Because its work didn't produce any results worth mentioning — as the Luckhardt brothers put it — they decided to extend the group in terms of geography and membership. In a letter dated April 1926, they asked several architects in Germany and Austria to join. Shortly after they were invited to a constitutional meeting in Berlin. The members of the Novembergruppe (November-Group), which had been founded in 1918 and whose members, a collective of painters, sculptors and architects, were seeking to transpose the impulse of the November Revolution into the arts, were also asked to take part.

On 29 May 1926, 16 of them met in the office of Mies, wrote a programme and elected Hugo Häring their secretary.

== Members ==
- Walter Curt Behrendt, Berlin
- Richard Döcker, Stuttgart
- Fred Forbát, Berlin
- Walter Gropius, Dessau
- Otto Haesler, Celle
- P. Rudolf Henning
- Ludwig Hilberseimer
- Arthur Korn
- Carl Krayl
- Hans Luckhardt
- Wassili Luckhardt
- Ernst May
- Adolf Meyer, Frankfurt am Main
- Bernhard Pankok
- Adolf Rading, Breslau
- Hans Soeder, Kassel
- Hans Scharoun, Berlin
- Karl Schneider, Hamburg
- Heinrich Tessenow
- Martin Wagner, Berlin
