= Otto Haesler =

German architect

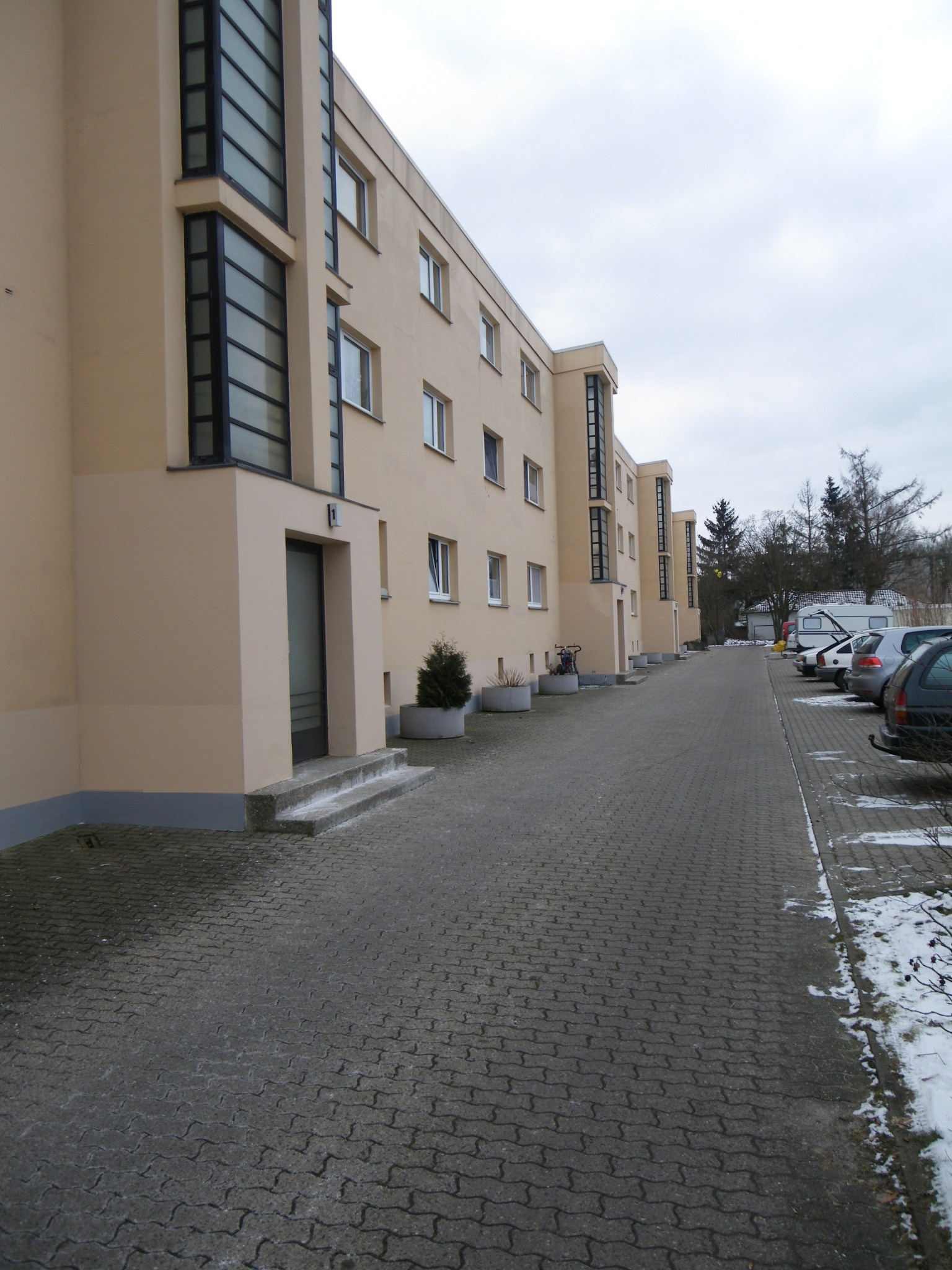
- Georgsgarten, Celle 1925 (built 1926/27)
- Born: 13 June 1880; Munich, Kingdom of Bavaria, German Empire
- Died: 2 April 1962 (aged 81); Wilhelmshorst (Potsdam), GDR
- Occupation: Architect
- Spouse: Erna Heer

Otto Haesler (13 June 1880 – 2 April 1962) was an influential German architect.

He is often grouped with Bruno Taut, Ernst May and Walter Gropius as being among the most significant representatives of the Modernist ("Neues Bauen") architecture that became important initially during the Weimar period, notably in respect of residential accommodation.

== Life ==
=== Early years ===
Otto Haesler was born in Munich slightly fewer than ten years after Bavaria had been incorporated into the new German state. He attended secondary school in Passau where during school holidays he worked as a draftsman for the city building department. Between 1898 and 1902, he attended Building Academies in Augsburg und Würzburg.

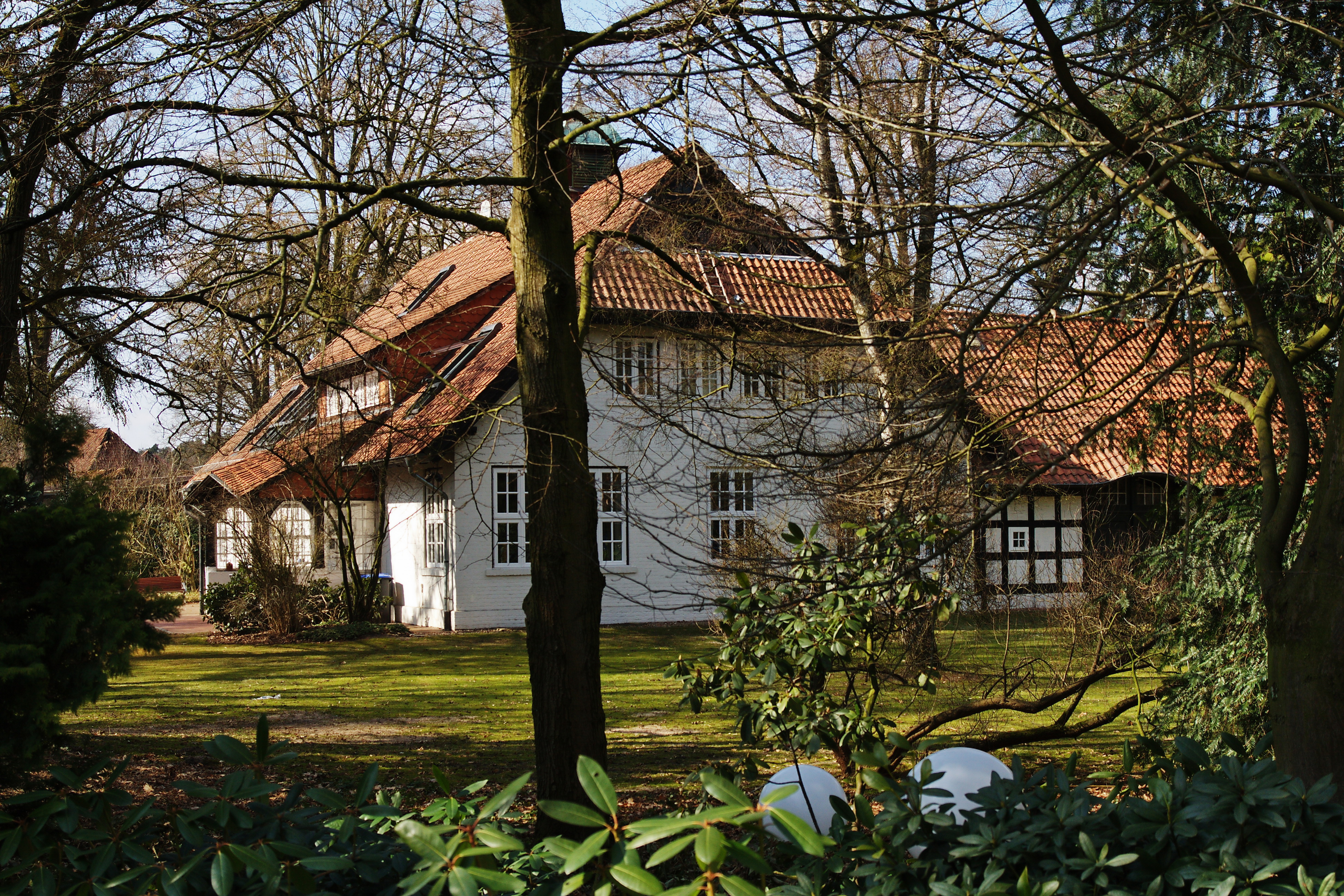
For the school in Bannetze Haesler invoked a relatively traditional repertoire, specifying an interrupted-hipped roof (Krüppelwalmdach).

In 1902, Otto Haesler began training as a bricklayer in Frankfurt am Main. In 1903, he took a job in the Frankfurt office of the noted architect Ludwig Bernoully. Later on in 1906, he set himself up in his own architecture practice in Celle, focusing on commercial renovation and "new-build" developments. A significant project from this time was the "Trüllerhaus". In 1908, he joined an architectural partnership with Karl Dreher. In 1914, he applied unsuccessfully for a position in public office locally as Bürgervorsteher. Between 1915 and 1917, when he was wounded, he participated in the war.

The end of the war in 1918 marked the start of a busy period for Haesler, now aged nearly 40. In 1918, he produced his proposal for the "Auf der Heese" residential development in Celle's Carstens Street (Carstensstraße). This referenced back to existing plans from before the war, as a watercolour drawing by his former partner Karl Dreher, who had been killed in 1916, demonstrates. Each of the 32 terraced houses featured a saddleback roof and a kitchen/living area, adumbrating mainstream features of "modern" twentieth century housing. For detached buildings, such as the school (originally drawn by Haesler in 1911, and today used as a day centre and meeting space), in the village of Bannetze, he had invoked a more traditional repertoire, specifying an interrupted-hipped roof (Krüppelwalmdach).

=== Neues Bauen ===
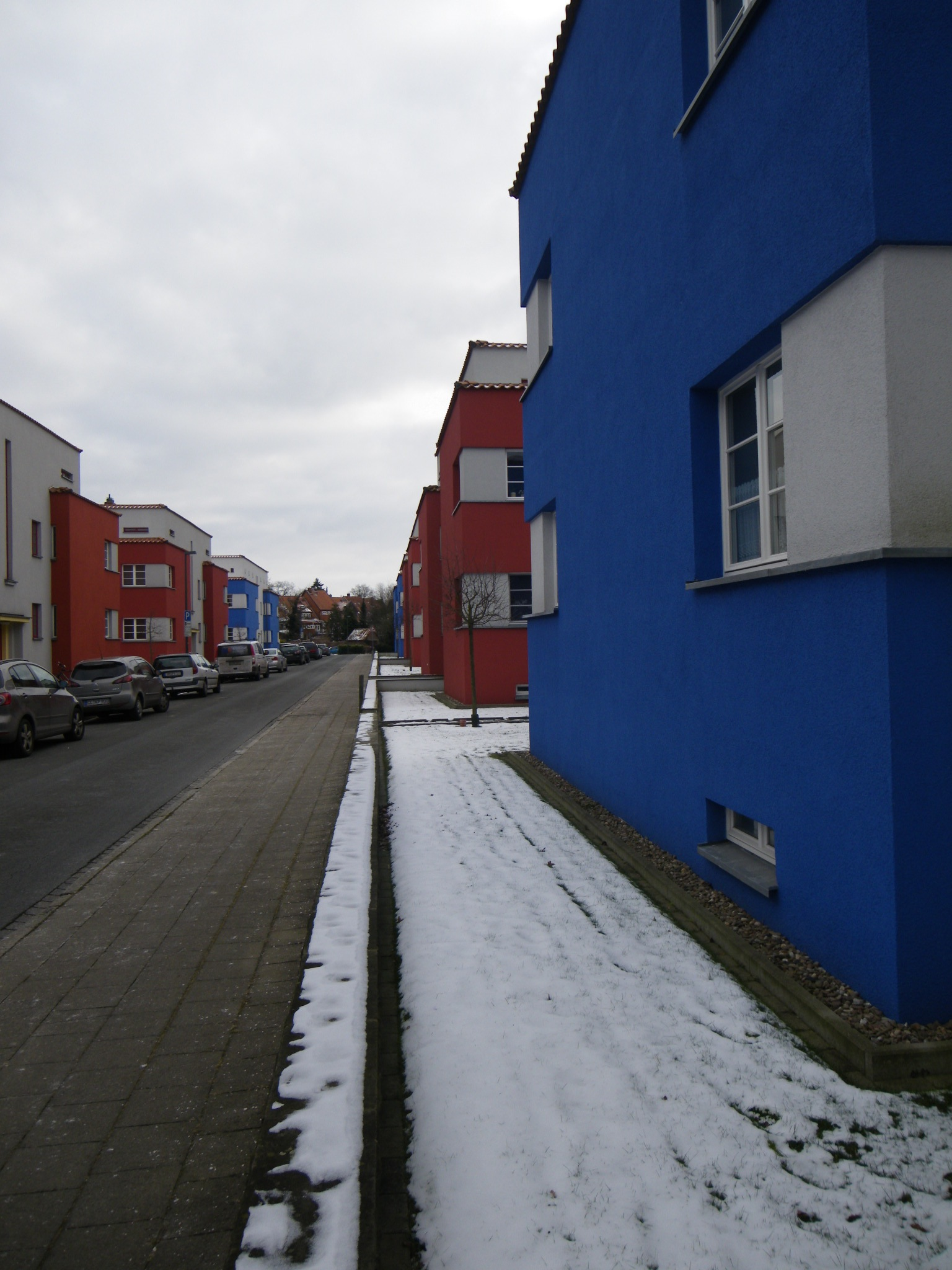
Otto Haesler's "Italian Garden Settlement" (1924/25) was the first of his three residential developments in Celle.

Haesler championed the building of social housing, providing improved living conditions for an increased number of tenants at an affordable rent. He wanted to reduce costs and at the same time improve living spaces by using standardised floor plans and employing the newly available steel frame construction methods. He therefore oriented and designed his developments to maximise the use of sunlight, replacing corridors with living rooms able to benefit directly from the afternoon sun, and bedrooms directly accessible from the day-time living spaces. He rationalised and industrialised modern residential development.

There are three residential Otto Haesler developments in Celle dating from the mid 1920s and early 1930s.

==== Italian Garden Settlement ====
With his first, the "Italian Garden Settlement" ("Siedlung Italienischer Garten") of 1924/25 Haesler incorporated inspiration he had gained from a visit to Bruno Taut in Magdeburg. Haesler publicised the modern design-language of the new buildings across Germany: shortly after completion, the Italian Garden Settlement came to be seen as the first "Neues Bauen" residential development in the country. There was no attempt at "interesting" ground plan lay-outs, and Haesler did not entirely stay within the economic restrictions mandated.

==== Georgsgarten Settlement ====
Haesler's "Georgsgarten Settlement" ("Siedlung Georgsgarten"), in 1926/27, was the first industrially constructed "ribbon cell" (terraced format) residential development. With the "Georgsgarten Settlement" Haesler succeeded in creating an "urban planning first". He applied the "Cabin floor plan" concept developed by Ludwig Hilberseimer, which gave rise to an open-plan cell structure, but combined that with contemporary fashionable touches such as prominent balconies, apparently influenced by the Gropius Bauhaus development in Dessau. The Georgsgarten also marked the first outing for the protruding three-sided glazed stair housing which from now on became a Haesler trademark.

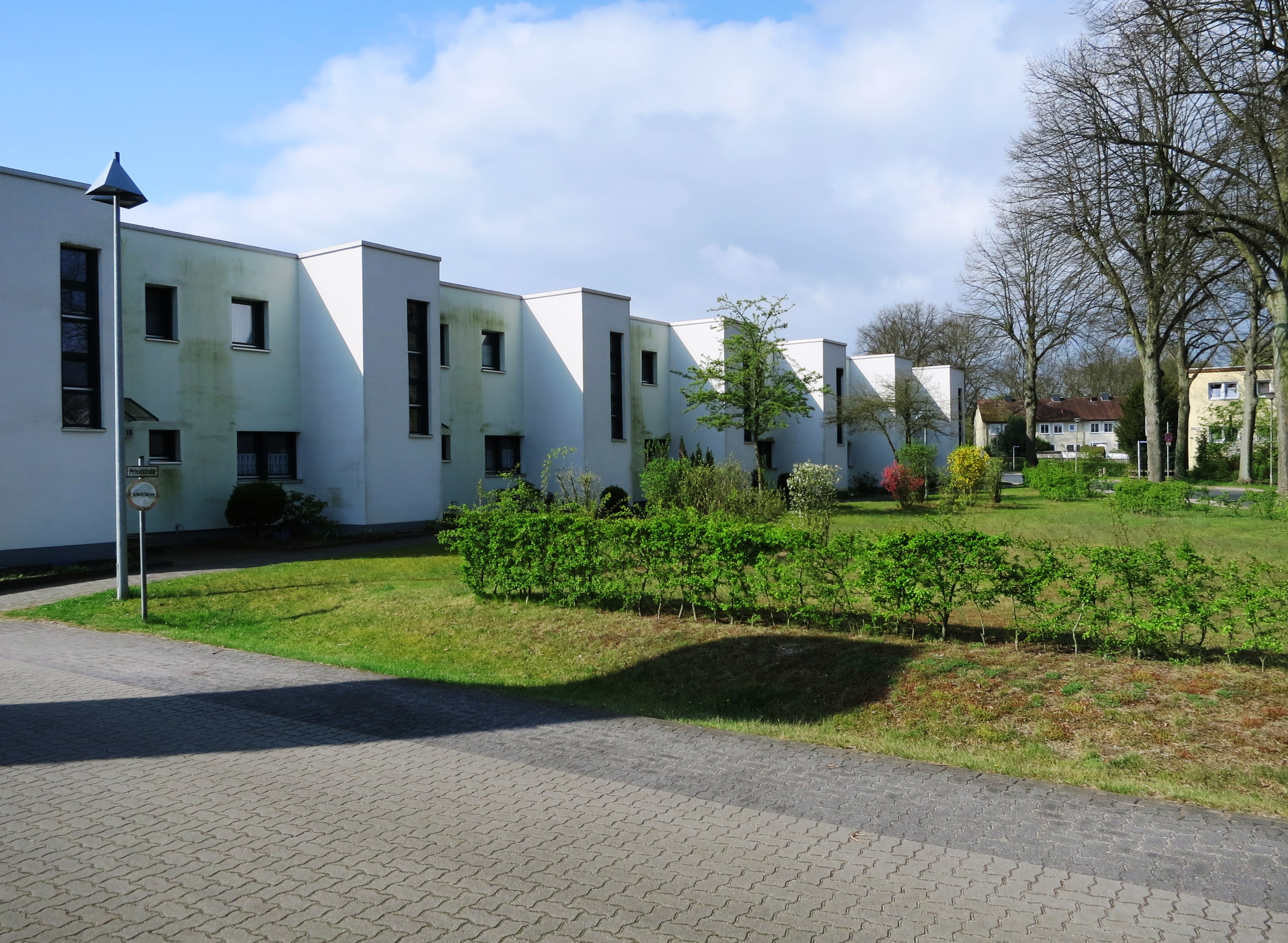
Blumläger Field Settlement (1930/31)

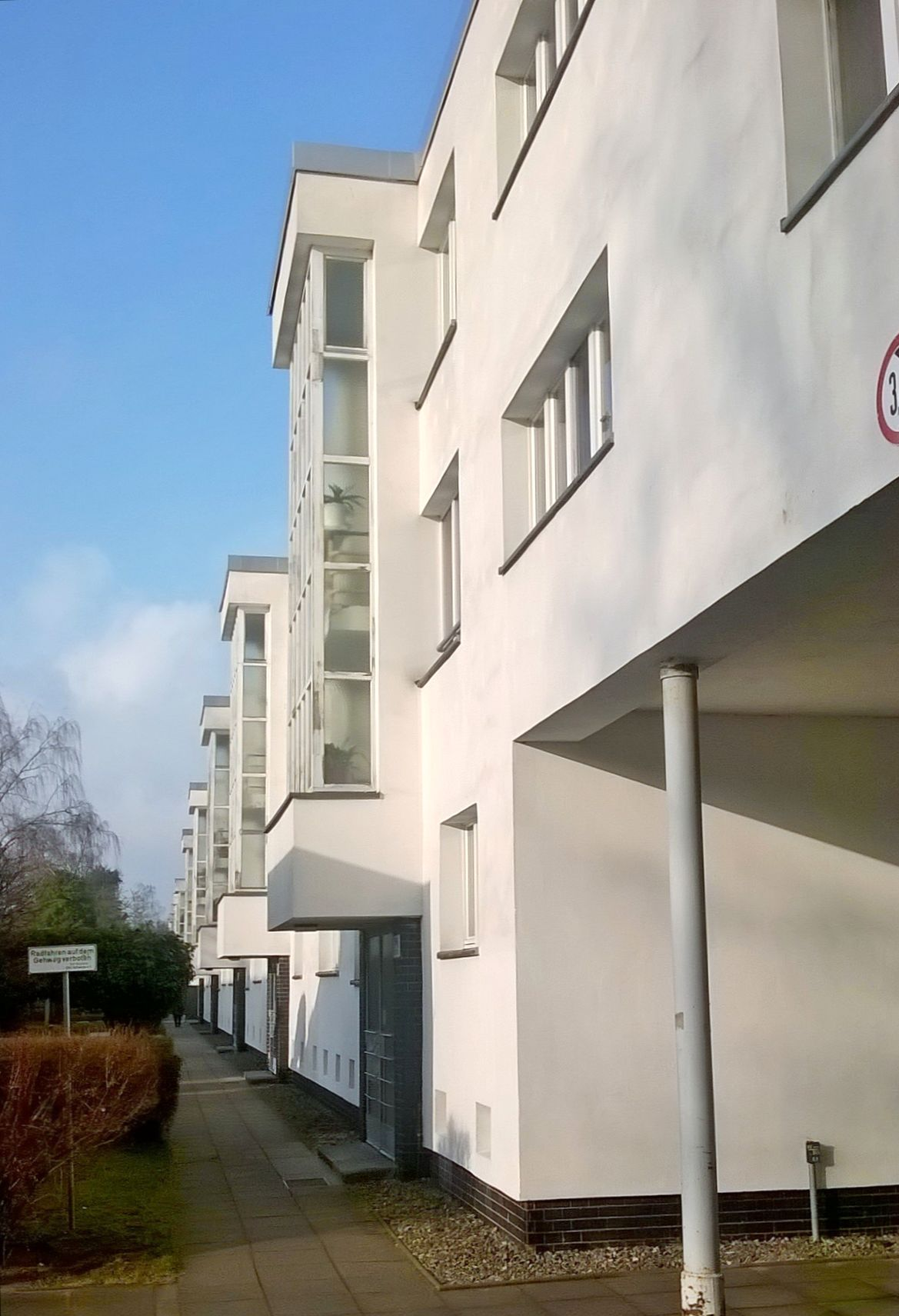
The "Friedrich Ebert Ring road settlement" in Rathenow again featured Haesler's "trademark" three-sided glazed stair housinings.

==== Blumläger Field Settlement ====
It was only with the florally named "Blumläger Field Settlement" ("Siedlung Blumläger Feld") of 1930/31 that it became possible to apply the planned rents. An unusual feature of this development was that each residential unit was assigned its own tenants' garden, directly accessible at the ground floor level. The incorporation of gardens gives the development a "garden city" character. The settlement was partly torn down in 2003, but the second phase, on the north side of the "Galgenberg" Street, remains fully preserved from that redevelopment.

==== Other works ====
Although it is convenient to group together Haesler's three major "Neues Bauen" residential development projects in Celle, by the late 1920s he was also undertaking high-profile projects in other cities. So far not mentioned works include:

- The "Friedrich Ebert Ring road settlement" in Rathenow (1928–31)
- The "Altstädter secondary school" in Celle (1928)
- Buildings in the "Dammerstock settlement" in Karlsruhe (1929)
- The "Rothenburg settlement" in Kassel (1929–31)
- The "Marie von Boschan Aschrott retirement home" in Kassel (1930–32)

=== Memberships ===
Otto Haesler was a member of the "Bright Star Masonic Lodge" ("...zum hellleuchtenden Stern") from 1909 till 1931. In 1925 he was invited to join the increasingly influential German Craftsmen's Association, and in 1926 he joined Der Ring, an advocacy group created by modernist architects which would be dissolved when confronted by violent government opposition in 1933. In 1927 he accepted an invitation to join the National Research Association for Economy in Building and Housing (RfG). In 1930 he was appointed as Expert Advisor to the RfG board. He also found himself proposed as a successor to Ernst May as city architect and planner for Frankfurt am Main, and as a successor to Otto Bartning as head of the Building Academy at Weimar. In 1932 Haesler resigned from the Association of German Architects and founded the operation "heimtyp ag".

=== Economic and political crisis ===
The early 1930s saw a return to economic collapse and eye watering levels of unemployment in Germany. The political left was split and the political centre was fragmented, which opened the way for the rise of the populist right wing NSDAP (Nazi party) under the able leadership of Adolf Hitler. Nazi ideology incorporated a remarkable capacity for hatred, and one of the Nazi targets was Bauhaus architecture, which Hitler passionately condemned as degenerate art. Following the General election of November 1932, in which the Nazis, with 37% of the vote, emerged as the largest single party, they took power in January 1933, and the ensuing months saw a rapid retreat from democracy, in favour of one-party government. Otto Haesler was subject to physical attacks: he also suffered an intense reputational assault from conservative and Nazi architects and by the Nazi press. "Heimtyp ag" which Haesler had founded in 1932 was bankrupted in 1933.

=== Twelve Nazi years ===
Violently attacked by the regime, in 1934 Haesler went into a form of internal exile, closing down his office in Celle and relocating to Eutin, a small town in Schleswig-Holstein, some 130 km (80 miles) from the Danish border. Here he continued to build houses, now using the traditional brick construction characteristic of the region, but still with structural elements of modern architecture.

In 1939 Germany invaded Poland, triggering a more general war across much of Europe. By this time Haesler had evidently returned to favour sufficiently to be appointed Deputy City Building Consultant for Lodz, controlled by Germany and increasingly populated by ethnic Germans between 1939 and 1945, and for Lemberg (under German control between 1941 and 1944). In 1943 Haesler was also part of a planning project for the reconstruction of Sebastopol which had recently been largely destroyed in fighting.

=== Soviet occupation zone ===
War ended in May 1945 and with it, as some thought, one-party dictatorship. The eastern part of Germany was now subsumed into Poland and the Soviet Union, while the rest of the country was divided into four military occupation zones. Haesler was given responsibility for rebuilding the destroyed city of Rathenow, an hour or so to the west of Berlin. This involved relocating, in 1946, to what was now administered as the Soviet occupation zone, where he would continue to live after the entire zone was transformed, formally in October 1949, into a Soviet sponsored stand-alone German state, the German Democratic Republic. Haesler would retain responsibility for the Rathenow rebuilding plans till 1955, latterly in partnership with Karl Völcker. In 1950 he was appointed Professor for Residential Development, and between 1950 and 1952 he served as head of the Building and Arts section of the Weimar Building Academy (as it was known by this time). However, at the end of 1951, with one-party government restored, the Ulbricht government came up with a strategy for architecture. This involved a rigorously applied change of direction in favour of "National building", which meant a stigmatising of the Bauhaus movement and its economically focused functionalism. Otto Haesler, now aged 71, found his own architectural philosophy and career abruptly sidelined.

In 1953 Haesler relocated from Rathenow to the Potsdam quarter of Wilhelmshorst, and in 1958 he married Erna Heer who had for many years worked as his housekeeper. She was his second wife. He died four years later in 1962, following medical complications after he fell into a trench that was part of a project to build a house he had designed for himself and Erna.
