= Wassili Luckhardt =

German architect (1889–1972)

Wassili Luckhardt (22 July 1889 in Berlin – 2 December 1972 in Berlin) was a German architect. He studied at the Technische Hochschulen in Charlottenburg (now Technische Universität Berlin) and Dresden (now TU Dresden). Luckhardt and his brother Hans worked closely together for most of their lives. Both were members of the November Group (Novembergruppe), the Arbeitsrat für Kunst, the Glass Chain and, from 1926, the progressive architecture group Der Ring. The brothers shared an office with the architect Alfons Anker (b. 1872, d. 1952).

== Biography ==
From 1907 to 1914 he studied at the Technische Hochschulen in Charlottenburg (now Technische Universität Berlin) and Dresden (now TU Dresden), with his studies interrupted by World War I. From 1921 to 1954 establishes architecture practice with his brother Hans, they shared offices with Alfons Anker from 1924 to 1934. He was a Member of the DDR Academy of Arts, Berlin, from 1955 until 1959 as a deputy director of the department of architecture. In 1958 he was awarded the Art prize of the city of Berlin. He received an honorary doctorate from Technische Universität Berlin in 1962.

In the 1920s the brothers belonged to the 20th centuries rising architects. Originally Expressionist they then turned to modernism. Their buildings are typical examples with skeletons of steel or reinforced concrete. During National Socialism the Luckhardt brothers tried initially to reconcile their architecture with the new ruling powers and joined even the Nazi Party. It quickly became apparent however that the new regime required a different architectural language. They were professionally disqualified and could only build three single-family houses in this time, the exterior of which was made to blend in with the preferred style of the regime.

After World War II they tried to return to their pre-war work. After the death of his brother Hans, Wassili ran the office alone. The 1959 competition for the Haus der Bremischen Bürgerschaft (city assembly in Bremen) was only realized after long discussions and repeated revision. In 1960 he was one of three architects shortlisted in a competition for the transformation of the Berlin Reichstagsgebäudes.

== Work ==
=== Buildings (selection) ===
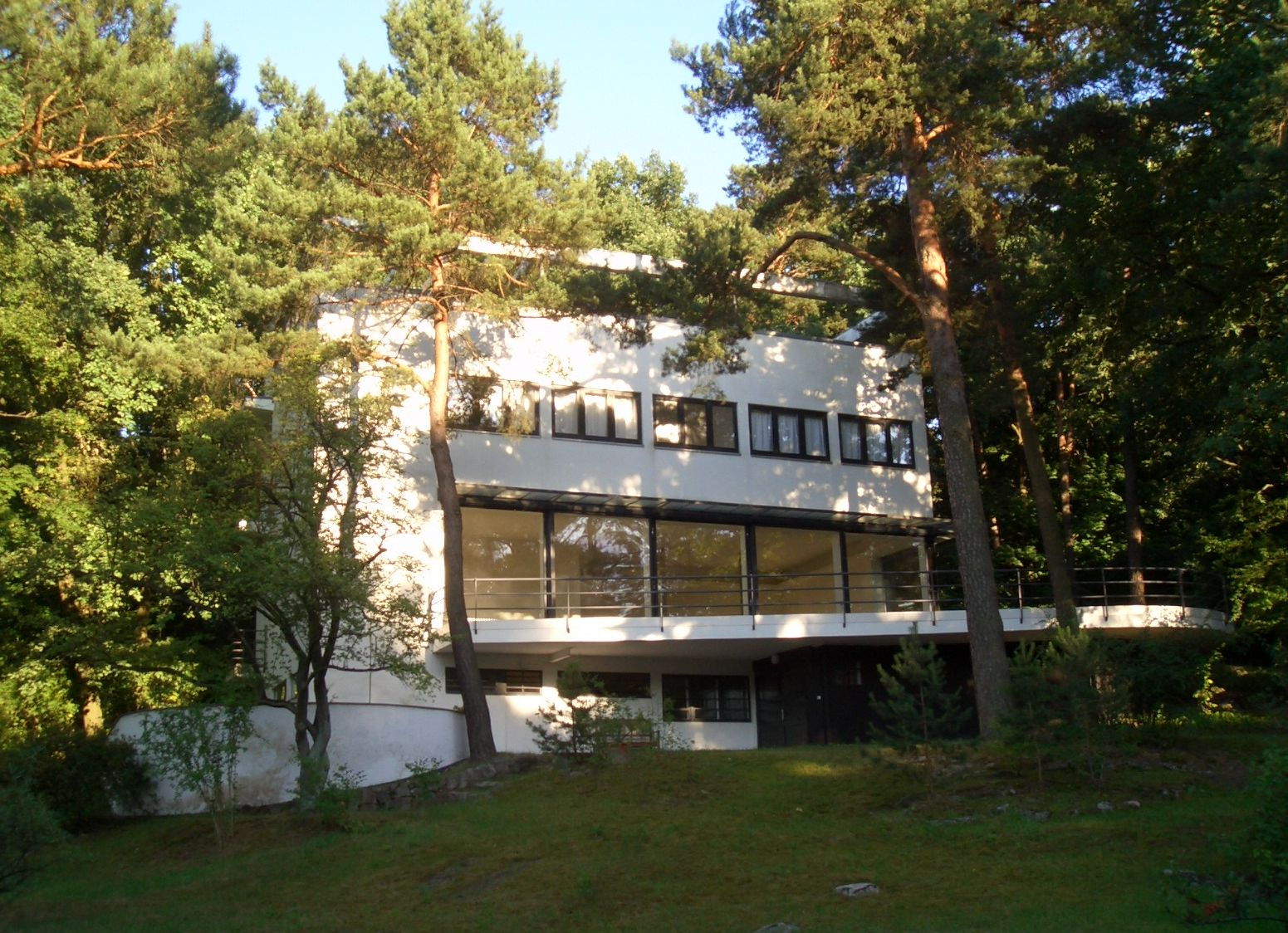
Am Rupenhorn 25 (1929/30), Berlin-Grunewald

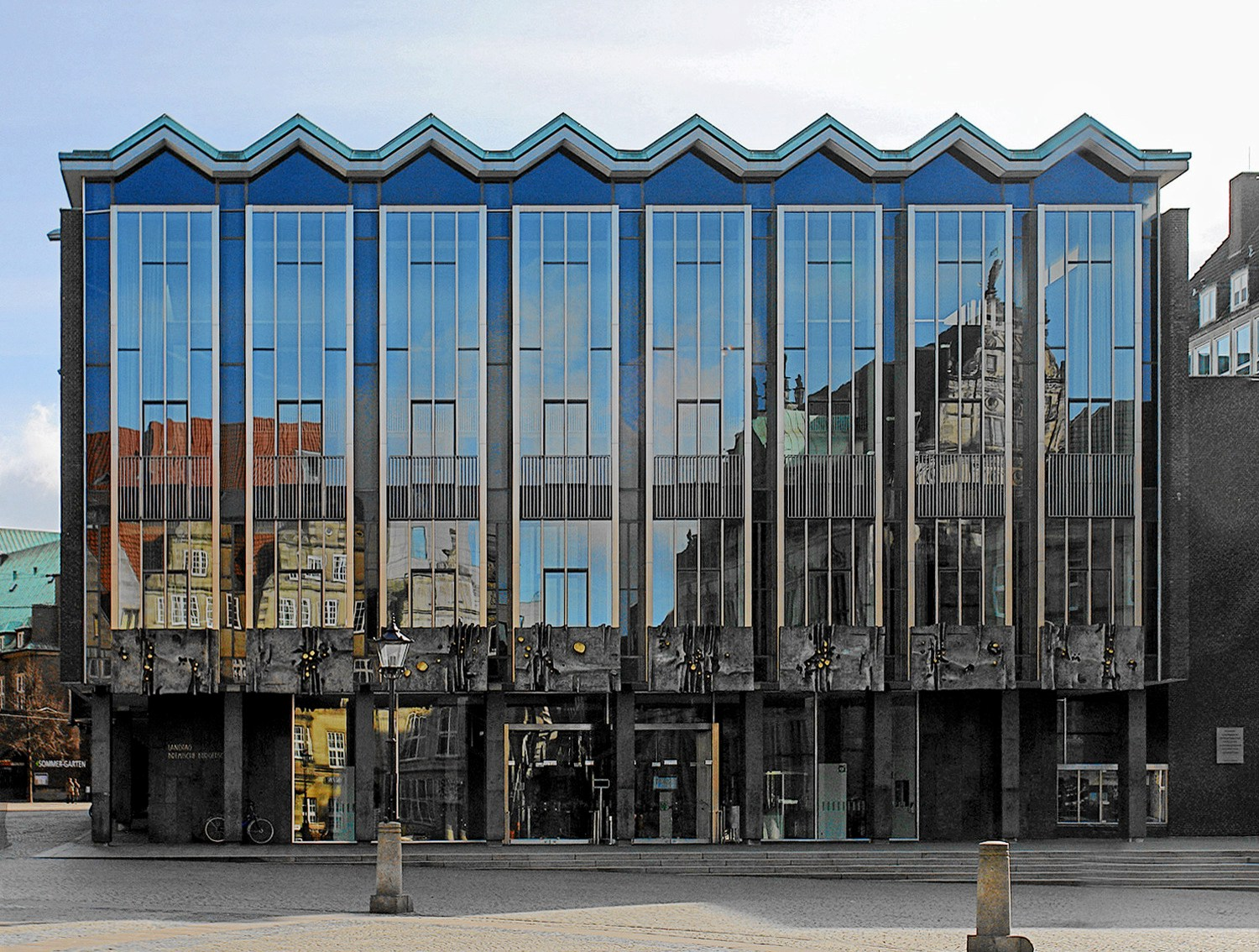
Haus der Bremer Bürgerschaft (city assembly), Bremen (1959–66)

- Terraced housing at Schorlemerallee (experimental settlement), Berlin-Zehlendorf (1925–30, alterations)
- Offices at Tauentzienstraße, Stadtküche Kraft, Berlin (1925, destroyed in the war)
- Chrysler-Haus, Berlin (1927, 1961 demolished)
- Office at Hirsch, Berlin (1926–27)
- House Buchthal, Berlin-Charlottenburg (1928, later converted and extended)
- Telschow-House, Berlin-Tiergarten (1928–29, destroyed in the war)
- Country house, Kluge, Berlin-Charlottenburg (1929)
- Houses „Am Rupenhorn”, Berlin (1919–32)
- Country house, Bibersteig, Berlin (1939)
- Berlin Pavilion at the Constructa 1951, Hanover (1951, destroyed)
- High-rise residential building, Kottbusser Tor, Berlin, (1952–55)
- Housing for Interbau (Object 9), Klopstockstraße, Berlin-Tiergarten (1957)
- Own house, Berlin-Zehlendorf (1957)
- National office for Bavaria, München-Maxvorstadt, (1953–57,1989 demolished)
- Haus der Bremer Bürgerschaft (city assembly), Bremen (1959–66)
- Veterinary Institute of Free University of Berlin, Koserstraße (1963–67)
- Pflanzenphysiologisches Institute of the Free University of Berlin (1962–70)

=== Projects (selection) ===
- Competition for the German Hygiene Museum, Dresden (1920)
- Competition high-rise building at the railway station Friedrichstraße, Berlin (1922)
- Competition for the redesign of the Alexanderplatz, Berlin (1929)
- Tower-house for the Potsdamer Platz, Berlin (1930)
- Medical University Preßburg (1933)
- Competition „Rund um den Zoo”, Berlin (1948)
- Competition for the transformation of the Reichstag building, Berlin (1960)
