= Hermann Finsterlin =

German artist, writer, toymaker and composer

Hermann Finsterlin (18 August 1887 – 16 September 1973) was a German visionary architect, painter, poet, essayist, toymaker and composer. He played an influential role in the German expressionist architecture movement of the early 20th century but due to the harsh economic climate realised none of his projects. By 1922, Finsterlin had withdrawn from the circle of expressionist architects as they moved towards the New Objectivity movement, he moved to Stuttgart to concentrate on painting and writing.

== Life ==
Finsterlin was born in Munich. He originally studied medicine, physics and chemistry, and then later, philosophy and painting in Munich. In 1919 he assisted Walter Gropius in organising the "Exhibition for Unknown architects" for the Arbeitsrat für Kunst and contributed to Bruno Taut's Glass Chain letters under the pseudonym Prometh.

Finsterlin had a curious career: he was an architect who "never built a permanent structure." Under the Nazi regime in the 1930s, Finsterlin was commissioned to produce official portraits and frescoes in state buildings "through a misunderstanding...." Finsterlin dodged the responsibility through feigned illness as long as he could, and supplied his art to the Nazis only under threat of concentration camp incarceration. In 1944 his house was bombed and much of his life work was demolished — though he was able to regenerate some of his past work in the 1960s. He died, aged 86, in Stuttgart. His work was the inspiration for "Da Monsta", an expressionist gate house on Philip Johnson's Glass House compound.
