= Paul Gösch =

German painter

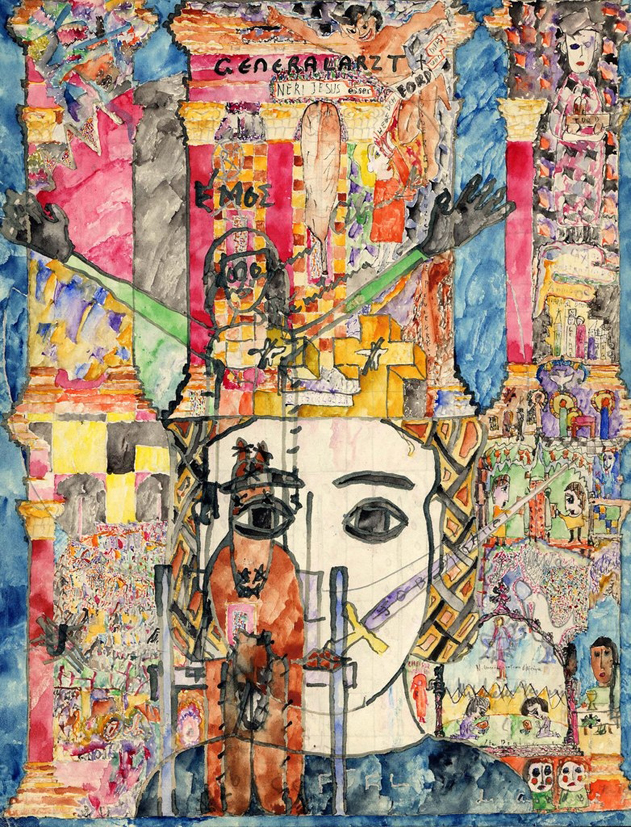
Gösch's "o.T." (1928).

Paul Gösch (30 August 1885 – 22 August 1940), also Goesch or Göschen, was a German artist, architect, lithographer, and designer of the early twentieth century; he was associated with the main elements of German Expressionism.

== Beginnings ==
Gösch was born in Schwerin. He experienced "physical and emotional frailty" throughout his life, but nonetheless maintained "a robust determination to create prolifically and to further the utopian causes of the avant-garde of his time." Born in Schwerin, the son of a lawyer and judge, Gösch grew up in Berlin, where his father held a teaching position at the University of Berlin. Gösch matriculated in the Technische Hochschule in Charlottenburg (now Technische Universität Berlin) in 1903 to study architecture. As a student, he reportedly met both Sigmund Freud and Rudolf Steiner. He developed an interest in Anthroposophy, Steiner's version of Theosophy, and later helped construct the Goetheanum in 1913–14. He also had his earliest psychiatric hospitalization (1909), but still attained his academic degree. He studied painting in San Remo for six months, and traveled through Italy, France, and Germany, meeting other artists. In 1911 he accepted a post at Kulm (now Chełmno in Poland), and served as city architect there from 1915 to 1917.

== Creator ==
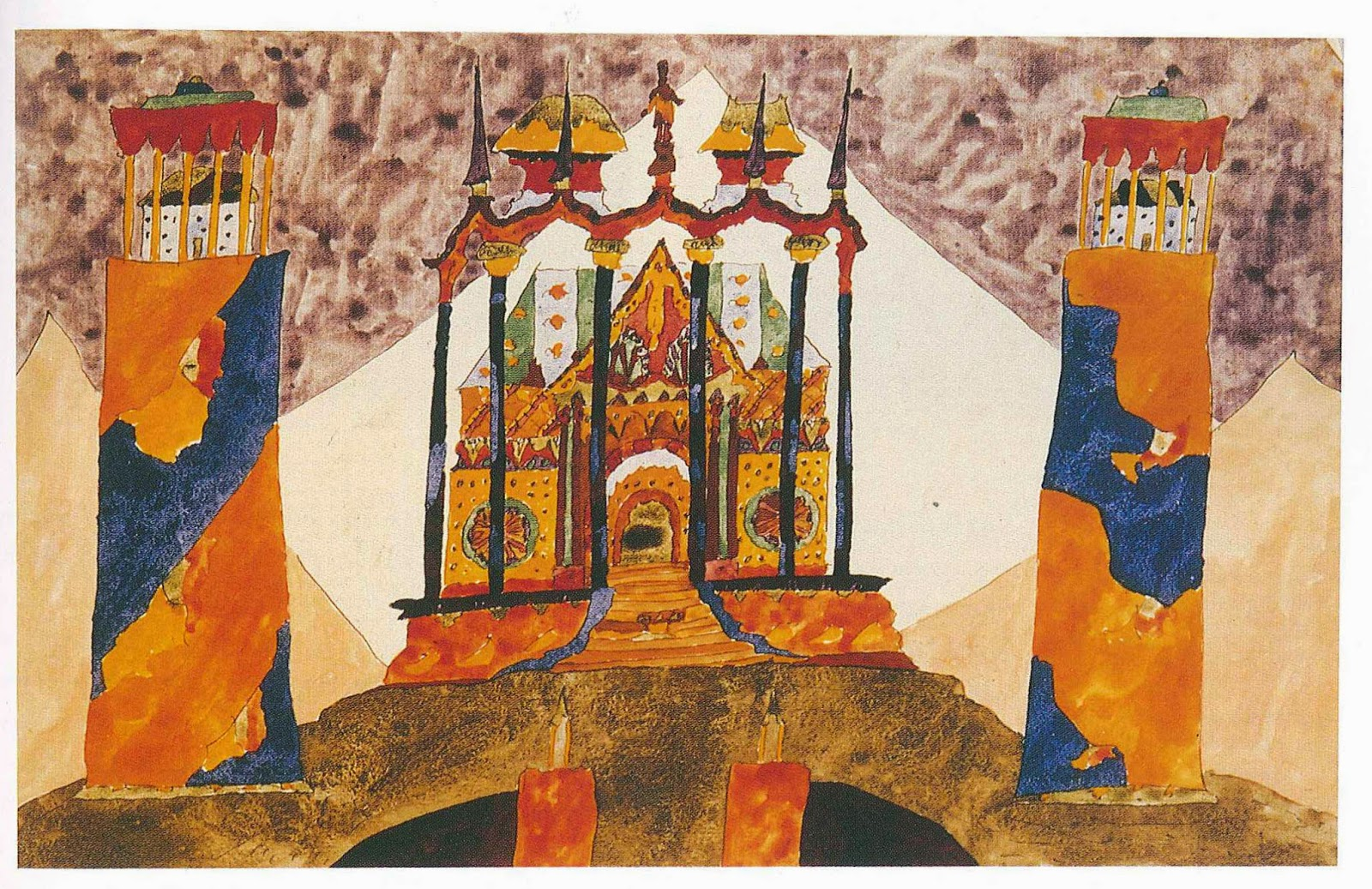
Fantasy Architecture

Gösch began a series of "fantasy architecture" plans and sketches in 1914. He had a psychotic episode in 1917, and was hospitalized until 1919. After his release he became associated with the November Group and the Arbeitsrat für Kunst and showed works in their exhibitions. He also was a member of the Glass Chain group. Gösch worked with Bruno Taut in Magdeburg on a 1920 restoration project; Taut published artwork and essays by Gösch in his Expressionist journal Frühlicht ("Daybreak" or "First Light").

Artistically, Gösch was a "Specialist in water color" who executed hundreds of images, often of mythological and religious subjects (especially the Virgin Mary). He also wrote and illustrated fairy tales and composed poetry (in the latter, he was strongly influenced by the poet Stefan George), some of which was published in the Charon magazine.

== Mental patient ==
In February and March 1914 Gösch helped build Steiner's first Goetheanum in Dornach, after which he worked as government building manager in Cologne for three months, gaining a diploma of a "Government Builder" (Regierungsbaumeister). Then Gösch was working as a civil servant in the East Prussian town of Kulm (today Chełmno) between 1915 and 1917. From 23.3.1917 to 10.10.1919 he was hospitalized in the psychiatric institution Westpreußischen Provinzial-Irren-Heil-und Pflegeanstalt Schwetz (now Świecie), where he made drawings 29 of which on paper and an extensive book of drawings he submitted when the 1919 Hans Prinzhorn sent requests to German-speaking institutions, clinics and sanatoriums to donate artistic patient works to the Heidelberg University Psychiatric Clinic to set up a "Museum of Pathological Art" („Museums für pathologische Kunst“), but in the end Gösch's works were not included in Prinzhorn's "Bildnerei der Geisteskranken: ein Beitrag zur Psychologie und Psychopathologie der Gestaltung" (Berlin, 1922) because the psychiatrist Prinzhorn decided Gösch's art did not qualify, as the latter did receive formal instruction in painting. Gösch's works have only been shown in group exhibitions since the Heidelberg collection was rediscovered in the 1960s. From 1921 on, Gösch increasingly had psychological difficulties; he became a patient at Göttingen where his brother-in-law was the head of the psychiatric institution. Gösch's murals on the walls of his room still exist there. (At the time he was diagnosed with "dementia praecox," what modern psychiatry would likely diagnose as schizophrenia.) In 1934, under the Nazi regime, Gösch was transferred to the Psychiatric Hospital of Brandenburg at Teupitz, where he was not allowed to paint and forced into manual labor. In 1940, personnel from the SS removed Gösch from Teupitz and murdered him; he was one of the thousands of victims of Action T4, the Nazi euthanasia campaign. The date and place of his execution have been disputed; the most reliable data indicate 22 August 1940, probably at the old prison in Brandenburg.

The combination of artwork and psychiatric problems in Gösch's biography has brought him some attention in the context of the outsider art or "art brut" movement. A number of Gösch's works are included in the collection of psychiatrist and art historian Hans Prinzhorn now maintained at the University of Heidelberg, and were displayed in the Prinzhorn collection exhibit of 1996.

The Canadian Centre for Architecture has 234 Gösch drawings in its collection.

== See also ==
- List of German painters
