= Paul Grunwaldt =

Paul Richard Carl Grunwaldt (born January 18, 1891, Berlin; died June 7, 1962, Weingarten (Württemberg), Germany) was a German painter and representative of Berlin Expressionism. He was a member of the artists' association Novembergruppe.

Paul Grunwaldt left behind an extensive artistic oeuvre. His wife, who died in 1983, wished that the paintings go to his hometown. Large parts of his artistic estate were donated to the Reinickendorf district, a borough of Berlin, where he lived for thirty years.

== Posthumous exhibitions ==
- 2015: The Berlin City Museum selected Grunwaldt's 1925 work "Varieté" as the cover image for the exhibition "Dance on the Volcano - Berlin in the Twenties as Reflected in the Arts."
- In 2015/16, the salon gallery "Die Möwe" presented, among others, a group exhibition entitled "In the Shadow. Works by Forgotten Modernist Artists." Works by Grunwaldt.
- 1987: Paul Grunwaldt, Oil Paintings, Watercolors, Drawings, exhibition of the Reinickendorf Art Office as part of Berlin's 750th anniversary celebrations.
- 1980: The Berlinische Galerie shows a work by Grunwaldt in its exhibition "Art in Berlin from 1930 to 1960."

== Gallery ==
Landscape with afterglow, 1914

Landscape with Haywagon and Ducks, 1914

Goats and Dunes, 1919

Horses in Forest Landscape, 1920

Still life with Lilies of the Valley, 1921

Varieté, 1925
