= Heinrich Stegemann =

German painter

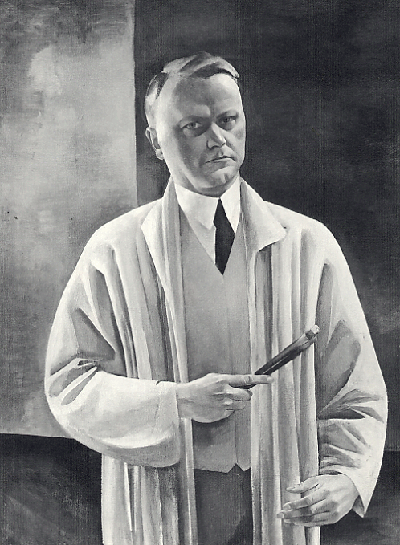
Self-portrait (c.1930)

Heinrich Stegemann (15 September 1888, Hamburg – 2 September 1945, Hamburg) was a German Expressionist painter and sculptor.

== Biography ==
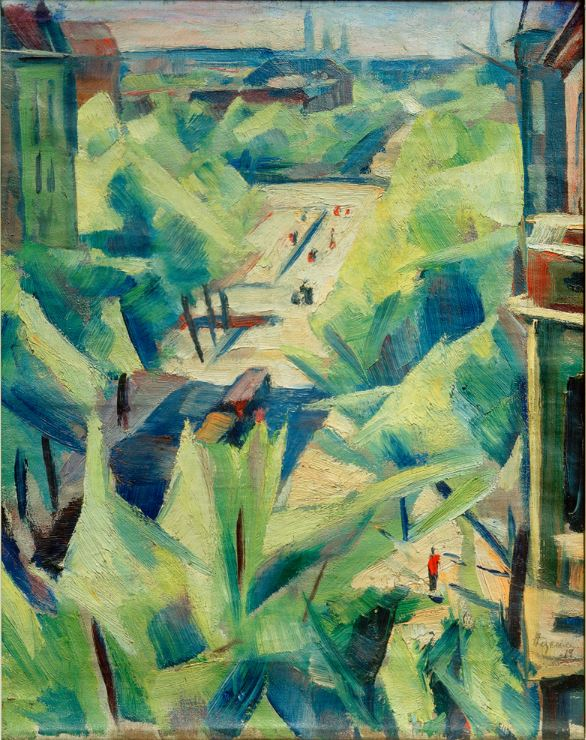
Mundsberger Damm, Hamburg

While serving an apprenticeship as a painter from 1904 to 1906, he audited classes by Franz Breest (1871-1931) at the Altonaer Kunstgewerbeschule (arts and crafts school). This allowed him to win a scholarship and become an enrolled student there from 1906 to 1907. He then transferred to the Grand-Ducal Saxon Art School, Weimar, where he studied from 1909 to 1913.

World War I marked a turning point in his career. At the age of twenty-six, he was recalled from studies in Italy, inducted, and posted to the western front. He fought until 1918, mostly at the front lines, was badly wounded, and reposted after a stay in the hospital. His experiences left him embittered and suffering from what is now called PTSD. When he had recovered sufficiently, he established himself as a free lance artist back in his hometown of Hamburg. He was a member of both the November Group and, after 1927, the Deutscher Künstlerbund (DKB).

In 1936, the Fine Arts Division of the Reich Chamber of Culture closed what would be the DKB's final exhibition, which he was directing. The following year, forty-three of his works were classified as "degenerate art" and confiscated. Three were shown at the Degenerate Art Exhibition in Munich. A bombing raid in 1943 destroyed his studio and all of his remaining art works. Twenty-two paintings and over one hundred drawings were in the possession of his friend, the art collector Wilhelm Werner, and were saved.

After his persecution by the Nazis he found it difficult to make a living as an artist. During this time, friends and anti-Nazi sympathisers helped support him and allowed him to continue his work by commissioning private works and family portraits which remain in private collections and are also among Stegemann's surviving body of work.

In 1945, he died of cancer and was buried in the Stellinger Friedhof, in Eimsbüttel.

In 2007, Annegret Moderegger and Burchard Bösche created the Heinrich Stegemann Art Foundation; dedicated to art in public spaces. They have initiated several exhibitions; often in collaboration with the Alfred Toepfer Stiftung F.V.S. and the Staats- und Universitätsbibliothek Hamburg.

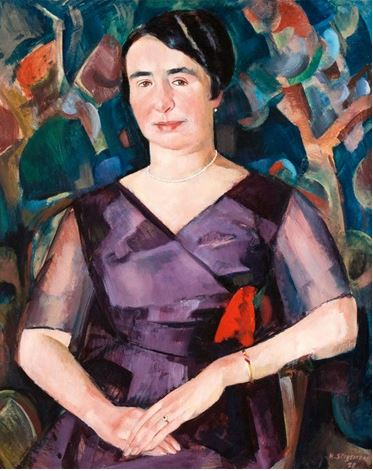
Portrait of a Lady
