= Yefim Golyshev =

Ukrainian painter and composer

Yefim Golyshev (Ukrainian: Юхим Голишев), variously transliterated as Golyscheff, Golyschev, Golishiff, Golishev, etc., 8 September 1897 – 25 September 1970) was a Ukrainian-born painter and composer who was mainly active in Europe.

After a successful career as a child prodigy violinist and the Reger Prize from Berlin's Stern Conservatory, Golyshev became one of the founding members of the Dadaist November Group, painting "anti-art" works and creating music for kitchen utensils and various new, invented instruments. In 1933 he had to flee from the Nazis, first to Portugal, then to Barcelona, where he worked as a chemist until 1938. He spent World War II in France, either in prison or hiding. Between 1956 and 1966 Golyshev, lived in São Paulo, where he influenced Brazil's Música Nova composers. He died in Paris in 1970.

Golyshev the composer is notable for his only surviving composition, a string trio. This piece, subtitled Zwölftondauer-Komplexe (twelve-tone-duration complexes), was published in 1925 in Berlin, but was possibly written as early as 1914. It makes use of various 12-note and 12-duration complexes, making it one of the earliest pieces of music composed using a variant of twelve-tone technique, and predating Olivier Messiaen's work. There are five movements, four provided with titles referencing their dynamics:

1. Mezzo-forte (Largo)
2. Fortissimo (Allegro)
3. Piano (Andante)
4. Pianissimo (Allegretto)
5. Adagio (Adagio)

The dynamics in the last movement are left to the performers to decide on. Copies of the archival score can be ordered directly from Robert Lienau, the original publishers of the work.

The rest of Golyshev's compositional output, which included two operas, romances, music for Vsevolod Pudovkin's lost film Igdenbu the Great Hunter, a string quartet and other pieces, is lost.

Golyshev provided illustrations for Sensorialité Excentrique, the last book published by Raoul Hausmann in 1970.
