= Ilse Heller-Lazard =

German artist

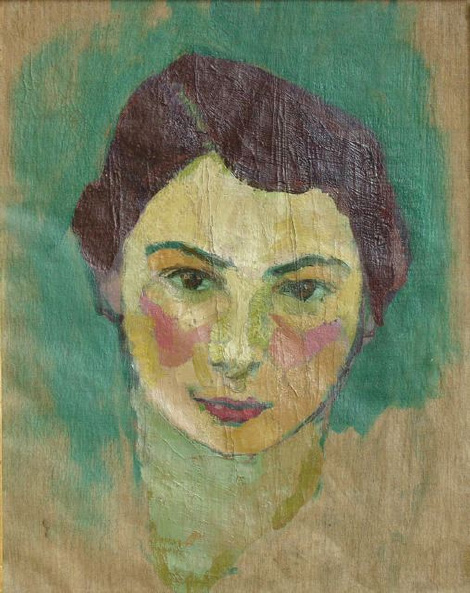
- Self-portrait
- Born: 3 August 1884 Metz 1884-08-03; Metz, Germany (now France)
- Died: 10 January 1934 (aged 49); Neuilly-sur-Seine, France
- Known for: Painting
- Spouses: Paul Gayer (m. 1910–1913) Ernst Heller (m. 1918)

Ilse Heller-Lazard (1884–1934) was a German painter.

== Biography ==
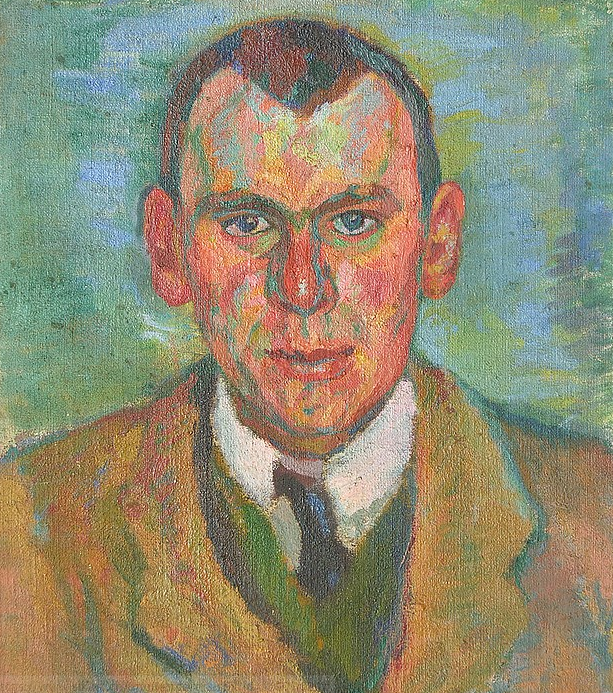
Ernst Heller

Heller-Lazard was born on 3 August 1884 in Metz. Her sister was the painter Lou Albert-Lasard. She studied art and music in Strasbourg and Berlin. In 1910 she married Paul Gayer whom she divorced in 1913. In 1918 she married the Swiss sculptor Ernst Heller. In 1919 she exhibited her work at the Kunsthaus Zürich.

She died on 10 January 1934 in Neuilly-sur-Seine, France. Her work has been included in three 21st-century exhibits at Das Verborgene Museum (The Hidden Museum) in Berlin.

== Gallery ==
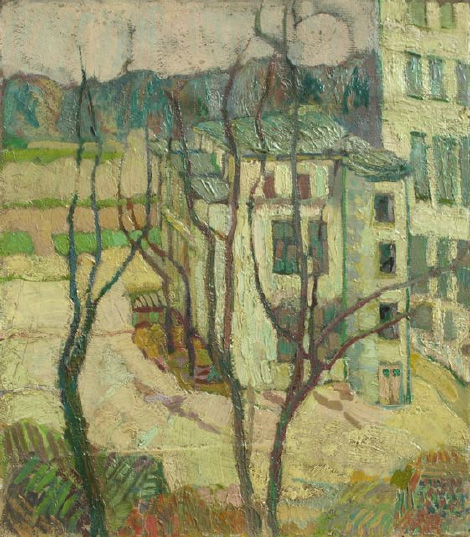
Haus

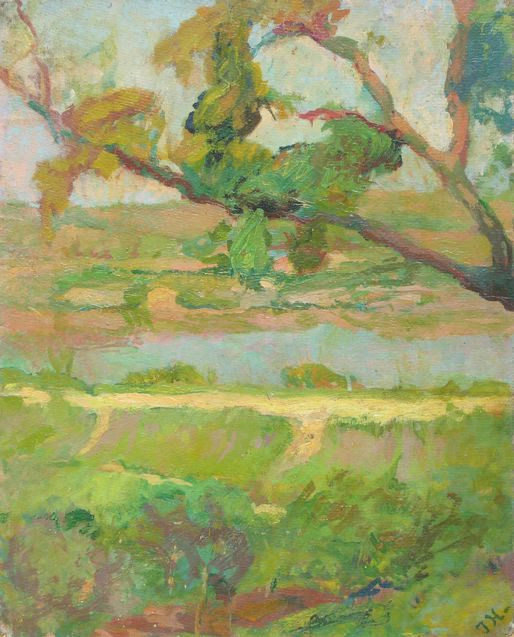
Tiber
