= Lou Albert-Lasard =

French-German painter

- Lou Albert-Lasard, 1916
- Born: November 10, 1885; Metz, France
- Died: July 21, 1969 (aged 83); Paris, France
- Resting place: Père Lachaise Cemetery
- Known for: Painting
- Movement: Expressionism
- Spouse: Eugene Albert (m. 1909)
- Partner: Rainer Maria Rilke

Lou Albert-Lasard (1885 in Metz – July 1969 in Paris) was an Expressionist painter.

She was born in 1885 in Metz (then part of Germany) to a Jewish banking family. From 1908 until 1914, she studied art in Munich, where she and her sister, Ilse Heller-Lazard lived, and then in Paris. In 1909, she married Eugene Albert, a chemist 30 years her senior, (1856–1929) and had a daughter, Ingo de Croux-Albert (1911–1997). Separating from her husband, she studied with the artist Fernand Léger. She also had connections with the Belgian avant-garde magazine "Het Overzicht", which was directed by Michel Seuphor and Jozef Peeters.

In 1914–1916, while still legally married, she had an affair with German-language poet Rainer Maria Rilke. She lived with Rilke from 1914 until 1916 in Vienna, and moved in an artist circle that included, among others, Romain Rolland, Stefan Zweig, Paul Klee, and Oskar Kokoschka. After breaking up with Rilke, she lived in Switzerland.

After 12 years in Switzerland, she moved to Berlin and joined an avant-garde artist group known as the Novembergruppe. Her work consisted mainly of drawings and etchings of her friends. In 1928, she returned to Paris and was part of the Montparnasse art society. She befriended Henri Matisse, Alberto Giacometti, and Robert Delaunay.

She traveled with her daughter to North Africa, India, Tibet, Cambodia and other countries. Drawings and watercolors from these travels were shown in 1939.

In May 1940, she and her daughter were interned at Gurs in southwestern France, but were later released. While imprisoned, she painted and drew portraits of fellow prisoners and camp scenes. Several of her works signed done in Gurs (signed "Mabull" which in French slang means crazy) are included in the art collection of Beit Lohamei Haghetaot (The Ghetto Fighters' House Museum).

After her release, she returned to Paris and managed to escape the German and French raids by hiding, fearing denunciation. In the 1950s, she again traveled with her daughter, often in a mobile home, painting her experiences via watercolor and lithography.
