= Hugo-Häring-Haus =

Coordinates: 48°06′13″N 9°48′00″E

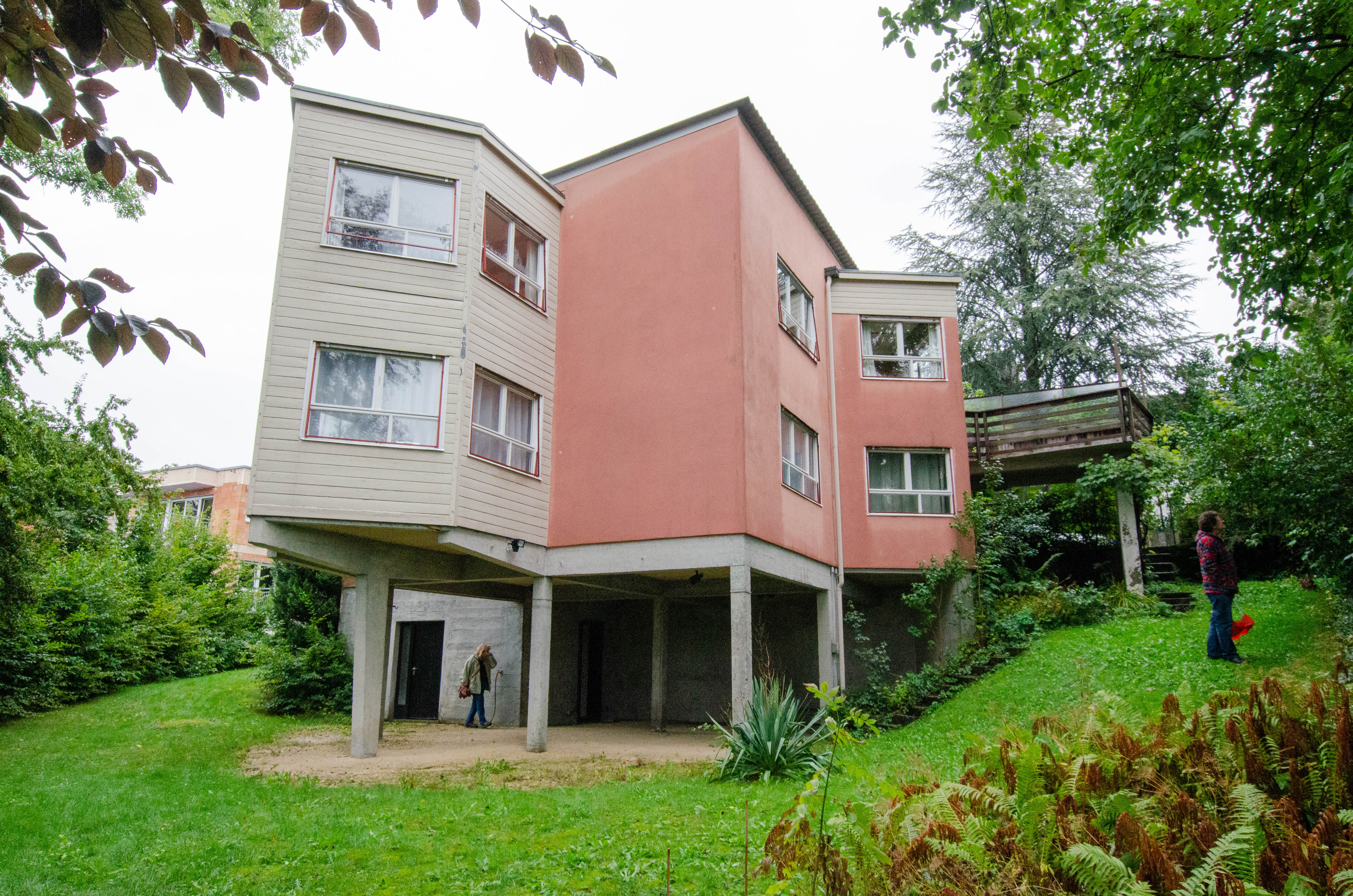
Hugo-Häring-Haus, 2019

The Hugo-Häring-Haus (also called "Hugo-Häring-houses") is one of two houses built by Hugo Häring in 1950 in Biberach an der Riß. With the support of Kreissparkasse Biberach, it became a municipal property, is a registered cultural monument of the modern age, and is being restored by the Hugo-Häring-Gesellschaft e.V. supervised.

== History ==
Hugo Haring, one of the most important representatives of the "New Building", built both houses after the Second World War. The house on the eastern slope of a steeply sloping slope of the Rißtal, northeast above the old town, located on Mettenberger Weg 17 was planned and built for Werner Schmitz. The larger house with the address Mettenberger Weg 15 was also planned and built by Hugo Häring for the father of Werner Schmitz, Guido Schmitz a weaving miller working in the silk mill.

The entry to the Hugo-Häring-Haus is on the upper floor. The core of the building is a two-storey building with a floor plan in the form of an angle. The one leg of the angle is directed with its long side of the south side and takes up the living rooms. The other, branching off to the north, the staircase and the side rooms. A south-facing pent roof emphasizes the opening towards the sunlight. Haring was not allowed to build during the Nazi period. He occupied himself at this time and later in theoretical writings with architecture. So he wrote about the design process when creating a floorplan in general:

"It's about building the house from the inside, starting with the living processes of living .... The outside is no longer given from the outset, it only becomes clear how the outside of all the structure of the organization first arises. The outside certainly sets boundaries for the organization, but it does not determine its form. You draw walls around residential groups, you do not place living groups in rectangles. ... there will hardly be a right-angled building. ... A natural order will be set up in which the endeavor is made to determine the place to the sun in detail, so that the house expands radially to the south to and from east to west, but the north turns its back. It behaves like a plant turning its organs to the sun." Hugo Häring

== Municipal property ==
After the acquisition of the house, they tried their best to restore the house to its original condition. The following components were the main interest of the dismantling:

- The outer skin of the house, especially the plaster façade, was renewed, the wood formwork painted wood-sawn again
- Wooden shutters were still preserved in the original and were revised
- Windows were partially very well received were also revised and made feasible
- Salubra wallpaper in the interior has been replaced by a similar product, which is made in Switzerland
- Alinolfußboden (plastic casting floor) had to be completely renewed
- Electrical installations
- Radiators were preserved or supplemented by the original type

== Literature ==
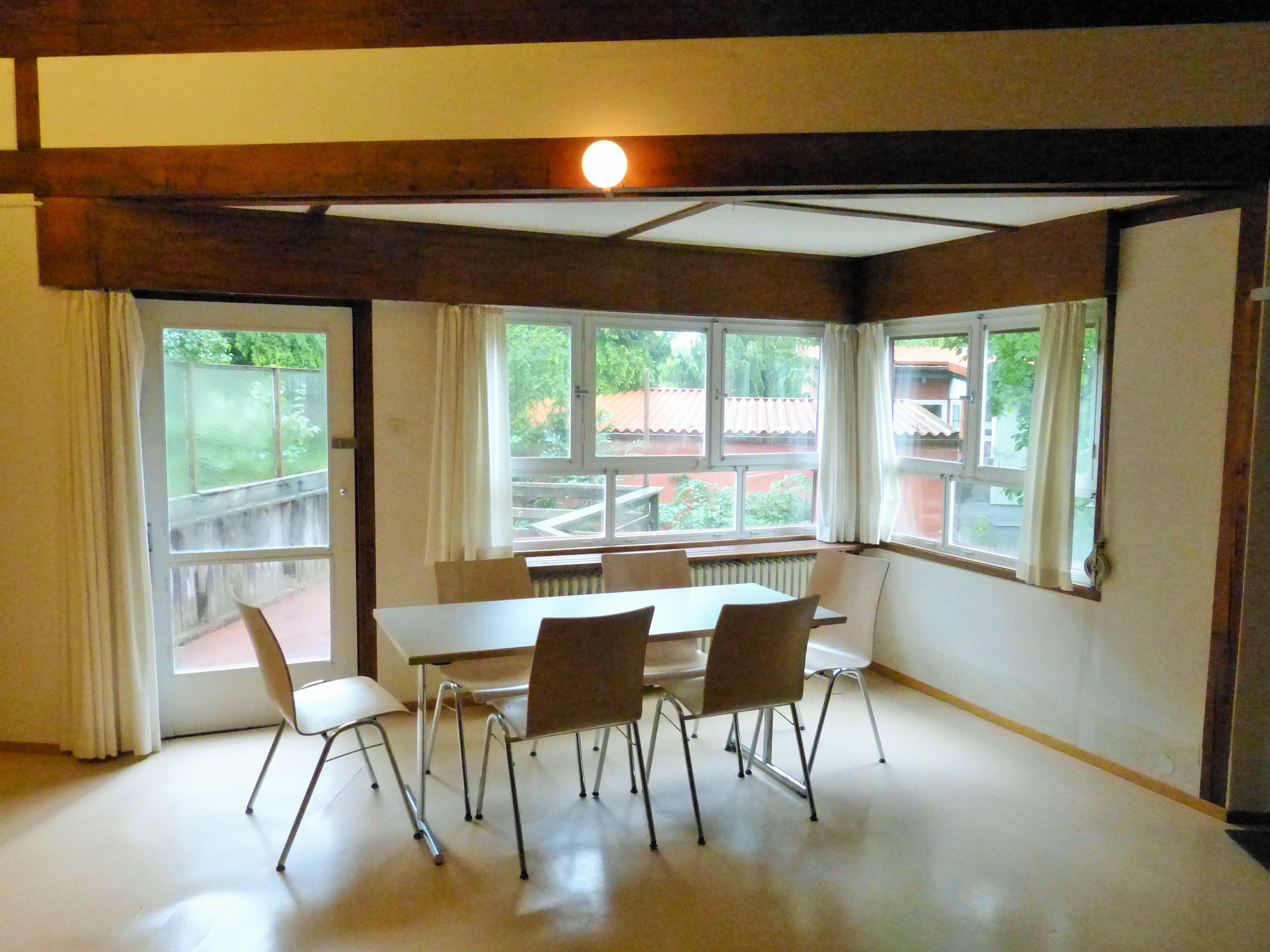
Living room, 2019

- „Neues bauen“ in Biberach/Riß – Das „Haus Mettenberger Weg 17“ : Guido Schmitz – Hugo Häring – Karl Böttcher / Joachim Ganzert; Katrina Obert; Petersberg : Imhof; 1. Edition; 2010, ISBN 978-3-86568-578-0
