= November Group (German) =

1918 German political group of artists

The November Group (German: Novembergruppe) was a group of German expressionist artists and architects. Formed on 3 December 1918, they took their name from the month of the German Revolution.

The group was led by Max Pechstein and César Klein. Linked less by their styles of art than by shared socialist values, the group campaigned for radical artists to have a greater say in such issues as the organisation of art schools, and new laws around the arts. The group merged in December 1918 with Arbeitsrat für Kunst (Workers Council of the arts – or 'The Art Soviet').

== History of the artist group ==
After its founding meeting on 3 December 1918 in Berlin, the Novembergruppe published an appeal in the Expressionist journal with the title Die schöne Rarität, which was also sent out as a circular letter to artists throughout Germany on 13 December 1918, soliciting further members.

The association's first office was located at 113 Potsdamer Strasse in Berlin (destroyed during the Second World War, level with today's No. 81). The house belonged to the art dealer and publisher Wolfgang Gurlitt. The artists and founding members César Klein and Max Pechstein in particular had been associated with the art dealer for some time.

In the first few months, 170 artists joined the newly founded Novembergruppe: 49 of them alone came from the editorial environment of Herwarth Walden's magazine Sturm. In the beginning, the artists' group was joined by Italian Futurists, important DADA artists as well as important Bauhaus members, some of whom belonged to the older Werkbund.

=== Weimar Republic ===
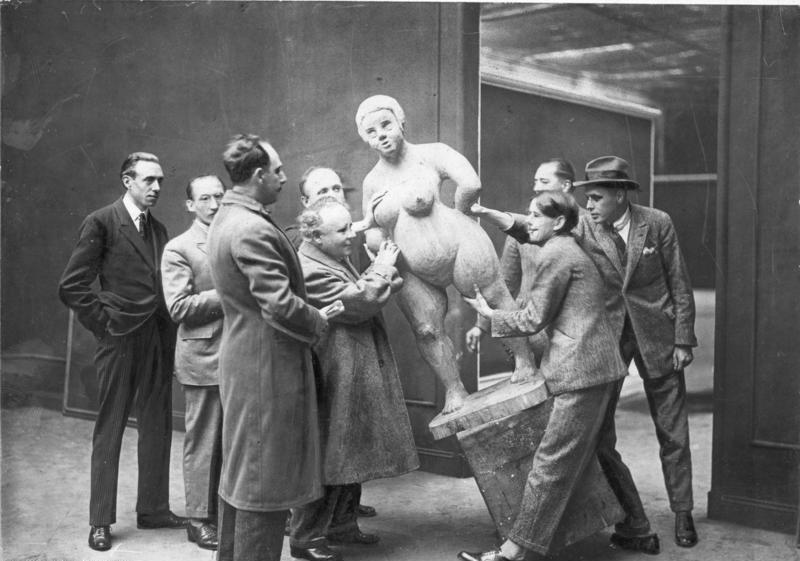
Preparation for the opening of the Große Berliner Kunstausstellung, June 1924

The artists of the November group described themselves as radical and revolutionary. Their work, like that of the similar Arbeitsrat für Kunst (Working Council for Art), aimed to support a socialist revolution in Germany. A key objective of the group was the union of art and the people. Furthermore, the group tried to influence public and cultural aspects of society.

In order to be entered in the register of associations, the association formulated the “representation and promotion of its artistic interests” as the purpose of its association in its statutes and gave itself an organisational form that endured with slight modifications in the following years. The executive committee consisted of a chairman, a secretary and a treasurer. The association had itself entered in the Berlin register of associations on 20 August 1920.

Characteristic of the artists of the November Group was a style syncretism that was often referred to as Cubofutoexpressionism. The neologism refers to Cubism, Futurism and Expressionism. The November Group was known for the diversity of its styles and disciplines, but is also criticised for this lack of uniformity and the resulting difficulty in classifying them stylistically. This diversity ranged from Expressionism and Cubism to Constructivism and represented “a middle ground between visionary and lyrical expressivity, constructive pictorial organisation and a sensitive and milieu-oriented objectivity.”

From July to December 1920, the Novembergruppe published six issues of the journal Der Kunsttopf. The texts reflected the liberal attitude of the authors, who consisted of members of the association as well as guests. The numerous illustrations documented the heterogeneous stylistic spectrum represented by the Novembergruppe. Recurring themes were the social responsibility of art and the opening of disciplines to collaborative work.

At the beginning of 1921, Raoul Hausmann attempted to take a leading role in the November Group. He drafted a sketch for the redesign of the Kunstopf in January. Together with Hans Siebert von Heister, Hausmann edited a new journal entitled NG (publication of the November Group), whose cover was designed by the artist Hannah Höch. The project was discontinued after only one issue.

With the dissolution of the Arbeitsrat für Kunst in spring 1921, many architects who had hitherto been organised in this association joined the November Group. In the same year, artists from the left wing of the November Group called for an end to the “bourgeois development” of the artists. The declaration was signed by Otto Dix, George Grosz, Raoul Hausmann, John Heartfield, Hannah Höch, Rudolf Schlichter and Georg Scholz.

On 20 January 1922, the general assembly of the Novembergruppe decided to admit writers and sound artists. In 1922, the decentralised November Group restructured away from a conglomeration of local groups and became part of the “Cartel of advanced artistic groups in Germany” (in German: Kartell fortschrittlicher Künstlergruppen in Deutschland).

As well as painters, there were many artists from other disciplines such as architecture and music. The musicians became one of the driving forces under their leader Max Butting (later replaced by Hans Heinz Stuckenschmidt).

At the end of 1924, Ludwig Mies van der Rohe took over the chairmanship of the association. In January 1925, the latter proposed that the management of the group must be professionalised in commercial terms. Hugo Graetz then became managing director and the association's office was moved to his gallery (Kunsthandlung Hugo Graetz), which was located at Achenbachstraße 21 (at the level of today's Lietzenburger Straße 33) in Berlin-Schöneberg.

On 3 and 10 May 1925, the November Group, in cooperation with the cultural department of UFA, organised the matinée Der absolute Film (The Absolute Film) at the Ufa-Palast on Kurfürstendamm in Berlin. Abstract and surrealist avant-garde films by German and French artists, including Ludwig Hirschfeld-Mack and Francis Picabia, were presented. The matinee is considered to be the first public screening of abstract film in Germany and at the same time the culmination of experiments in absolute film. The artists were convinced that the experience of the accelerated movement of the technical age called for a new art, and they sought new, innovative forms of representation through film in order to create a genuine art of movement. The Berlin press strongly condemned the screening.

At the beginning of 1927, all the architects except Alfred Gellhorn left the November Group and tried to represent their interests in the architects' association Der Ring (The Ring). Several visual artists and musicians also left the Novembergruppe in 1927. The loss of so many prominent comrades-in-arms plunged the association, which from this point on consisted of some 72 permanent members, into a serious crisis.

The group parted company with its managing director Hugo Graetz in the spring of 1930 and moved its office to the rooms of the gallery Die Kunststube, which was located at Königin-Augusta-Straße 22 in Berlin (today Reichpietschufer, at the height of house number 48). Members had already presented their works here on several occasions, including Otto Möller and Arthur Segal. The management of the art shop was in the hands of Ludwig Hermann Schütze and Charlotte Luke.

The November Group held regular art festivals, costume parties, studio visits as well as literary and musical events.

=== National Socialism ===
After the National Socialists came to power, all artists' and art associations were brought into line in the spring of 1933. This is effectively equivalent to an exhibition ban for the Novembergruppe. Like all avant-garde associations, the Novembergruppe was no longer permitted to participate in public exhibitions. The association was officially deprived of its legal capacity on 24 July 1935. Whether the dissolution of the Novembergruppe was requested or enforced by the Nazis themselves cannot be said with certainty due to the patchy nature of the files.

The November Group was called the Red November Group by the National Socialists. Because of their commitment to abstraction and atonality, their members were reviled as Bolshevik. In the diatribe Säuberung des Kunsttempels (The Cleaning of the Temple of Art) by Wolfgang Willrich, 174 former members and guests of the association were listed by name and publicly pilloried as “degenerate”. Like many avant-garde artists, former members of the Novembergruppe were dismissed from public office. According to Oskar Schlemmer, the dissolution of the artists' group began as early as 1932.

== Exhibitions ==
Exhibitions were regularly organised as the most important means of self-expression. Every year, the members of the artists' group were represented at the Große Berliner Kunstausstellung (Great Berlin Art Exhibition) with their own room. In addition, they exhibited together with the artists of their local groups scattered throughout the republic of the Weimar Germany.

The Novembergruppe invited important international artists or representatives of artist groups to its exhibitions. Thus in 1919 Marc Chagall, in 1920 Georges Braque, Fernand Léger and Marie Laurencin, in 1922 Henryk Berlewi and in 1923 El Lissitzky (with his legendary Proun Room) were represented in the Novembergruppe's section at the Große Berliner Kunstausstellung. Also in 1923, Ivan Puni and László Péri were among the exhibitors.

In the spring of 1922, the “Cartel of advanced artistic groups in Germany” (in German: Kartell fortschrittlicher Künstlergruppen in Deutschland), of which the November Group was a member, participated unitedly in the First International Art Exhibition in the rooms of the Düsseldorf department stores' Leonhard Tietz.

One of the most important international exhibition collaborations was a graphics exhibition held in collaboration with the Italian Futurists at the Casa d'Arte in Rome from 23 October to the end of November 1920, arranged by Filippo Tommaso Marinetti and Novembergruppe member Enrico Prampolini.

In 1921, the association was represented at the 16th Jury-Free Art Exhibition at the Stedelijk Museum in Amsterdam from 5 February to 6 March, at the invitation of the Dutch artists' group De Onafhankelijken.

In October 1924, the First General German Art Exhibition in Soviet Russia took place in Moscow, which subsequently travelled to Leningrad (now Saint-Petersburg) and Saratov. Thirteen German artists' associations participated, with the November Group being the most strongly represented group with 24 artists. The show became a great success with the Russian public, to whom German art had been largely unknown until then.

In 1925, a cohesive group of Prague architects participated in the November Group's exhibition at the Große Berliner Kunstausstellung. In 1926, more than 30 architects from the November Group participated in the Berlin Baukunst exhibition. The Kazimir Malevich Show in 1927, organised by the November Group, was one of the highlights of its exhibition history.

In addition, the association repeatedly exhibited in local galleries in Berlin: for example, in April/May 1920, an exhibition was held at the Gurlitt Gallery. This was followed by a smaller Novembergruppe exhibition from 4 to 30 November 1920 at the book and art antiquarian shop Fraenkel & Co (Josef Altmann). Josef Altmann, who had run the small gallery since 1914, can be considered the first art dealer of the Novembergruppe, who also represented individual members. Altmann's gallery again held a group exhibition from 1 to 30 November 1921.

== Members ==
=== Founding members ===
The group was initially founded mainly by painters Max Pechstein, Georg Tappert, César Klein, Moriz Melzer and Heinrich Richter. At the first meeting on 3 December 1918 they were joined by Karl Jakob Hirsch, Bernhard Hasler, Richard Janthur, Rudolf Bauer, Bruno Krauskopf, Otto Freundlich, Wilhelm Schmid, the sculptor Rudolf Belling and the architect Erich Mendelsohn. From this group the first working committee were drawn.

=== Women in the November Group ===
As in other revolutionary artists' associations, there were only a few women on the membership list of the Novembergruppe. Of the 49 founding members from the Sturm circle, Hilla Rebay was only one woman, although a large number of women were active in the Sturm circle. This was different at exhibitions of the November Group. Here, several women participated in exhibitions, in addition to Hannah Höch and Marie Laurencin, for example, Emy Roeder and Emmy Klinker.

=== List of members ===
A definitive list of all the members of the group is difficult to establish due to a lack of early documentation. According to research conducted by the Berlinische Galerie as part of the exhibition project Freedom. The art of the Novembergruppe 1918–1935 (2018), three lists of members have survived. Georg Tappert compiled a handwritten list of members in 1918, which is now in the estate of Walter Gropius in the Bauhaus Archive Berlin. A second list with the membership of the Novembergruppe was printed in the catalogue of 1925. A third list of members from 1930 was compiled by the Novembergruppe's managing director, Hugo Graetz, a copy of which is now in the Archive of the Academy of Arts in Berlin.

Among the mostly over 120 members were architects, painters, musicians and art theorists. The following is a listing of the members alphabetically by the first letter of the surname:

==== A ====
- Josef Achmann (noted on list from 1918)
- Jankel Adler (noted on list from 1930)
- Lou Albert-Lasard
- George Antheil
- Jean Arp (noted on list from 1918, 1925 and 1930)
- Rudolf Ausleger

==== B ====
- Willi Baumeister (noted on list from 1925 and 1930)
- Herbert Bayer (noted on list from 1925)
- Peter Behrens (noted on list from 1918)
- Herbert Behrens-Hangeler (noted on list from 1930)
- Rudolf Belling (noted on list from 1918, 1925 and 1930)
- Rüdiger Berlit (noted on list from 1918)
- Peter August Böckstiegel (noted on list from 1918)
- Kseniya Boguslavskaya (noted on list from 1930)
- Hans Brass
- Nikolaus Braun (noted on list from 1930)
- Marcel Breuer (noted on list from 1930)
- Max Butting

==== C ====
- Heinrich Campendonk (noted on list from 1918 and 1930)

==== D ====
- Heinrich Maria Davringhausen
- Walter Dexel (noted on list from 1925)
- Christof Drexel
- Kinner von Dressler (noted on list from 1925 and 1930)
- Friedrich Peter Drömmer (noted on list from 1930)
- Ewald Dülberg (noted on list from 1918)

==== E ====
- Heinrich Eberhard (noted on list from 1918 and 1930)
- A. Eberhardt (noted on list from 1925 and 1930)
- Josef Eberz (noted on list from 1918, 1925 and 1930)
- Viking Eggeling (noted on list from 1925)
- Heinrich Ehmsen (noted on list from 1930)
- Hanns Eisler (noted on list from 1930)
- Ignaz Epper (noted on list from 1925)

==== F ====
- Anton Faistauer (noted on list from 1918)
- Bedřich Feigl (noted on list from 1918)
- Lyonel Feininger (noted on list from 1925 and 1930)
- Conrad Felixmüller (noted on list from 1918 and 1930)
- Oskar Fischer (noted on list from 1925 and 1930)
- Peter Foerster (noted on list from 1925)
- Fred Forbát (noted on list from 1930)
- Hans Freese (noted on list from 1918, 1925 and 1930)
- Otto Freundlich
- Theodor Fried (noted on list from 1930)
- Alexander Friedrich (noted on list from 1918)
- Heinz Fuchs (noted on list from 1918 and 1925)

==== G ====
- Alfred Gellhorn (noted on list from 1925 and 1930)
- Paul Gösch (noted on list from 1925)
- Yefim Golyshev (noted on list from 1918)
- Werner Gothein (noted on list from 1918)
- Gottfried Graf (noted on list from 1925 and 1930)
- Walter Gramatté (noted on list from 1918)
- Otto Griebel (noted on list from 1925 and 1930)
- Walter Gropius (noted on list from 1925)
- Otto Großmann (noted on list from 1918)
- George Grosz (noted on list from 1930)
- Paul Grunwaldt (noted on list from 1925)

==== H ====
- Hugo Häring (noted on list from 1925)
- Erwin Hahs (noted on list from 1918)
- Bernhard Hasler (noted on list from 1930)
- Emil van Hauth (noted on list from 1930)
- Gustav Havemann (noted on list from 1925)
- John Heartfield (noted on list from 1930)
- Wilhelm Heckrott (noted on list from 1925 and 1930)
- Hans-Siebert von Heister (noted on list from 1925 and 1930)
- Wieland Herzfelde (noted on list from 1930)
- Oswald Herzog (noted on list from 1918, 1925 and 1930)
- Ludwig Hilberseimer (noted on list from 1925)
- Karl Jakob Hirsch (noted on list from 1918, 1925 and 1930)
- Leon Hirsch (noted on list from 1925 and 1930)
- Wilhelm Heckrot
- Hannah Höch (noted on list from 1925 and 1930)
- Bernhard Hoetger (noted on list from 1918)
- Lothar Homeyer (noted on list from 1918, 1925 and 1930)
- Jascha Horenstein (noted on list from 1930)

==== I ====
- Johannes Itten (noted on list from 1930)

==== J ====
- Philipp Jarnach (noted on list from 1925)
- Alexej Jawlensky (noted on list from 1930)
- Andreas Jawlensky (noted on list from 1930)

==== K ====
- Walter Kampmann (noted on list from 1925 and 1930)
- Wassily Kandinsky (noted on list from 1925 and 1930)
- Joachim Karsch (noted on list from 1930)
- Rita Kersten-Andexer (noted on list from 1918)
- Martin Kessel (noted on list from 1925)
- Georg Kind (noted on list from 1918)
- Bernhard Klein (noted on list from 1918, 1925 and 1930)
- Cesar Klein (noted on list from 1918, 1925 and 1930)
- Fritz Klein (noted on list from 1918 and 1925)
- Oskar Kokoschka (noted on list from 1918)
- Arthur Korn (noted on list from 1925)
- Heinrich Kosina (noted on list from 1925 and 1930)
- Heinrich Kosnick (noted on list from 1930)
- Hans Krebs (noted on list from 1925)
- Issai Kulvianski (noted on list from 1930)
- Alfred Kubin (noted on list from 1918)

==== L ====
- Otto Lange (noted on list from 1918, 1925 and 1930)
- Eva Lau (noted on list from 1918)
- Georg Leschnitzer (in Hebrew: גאורג לשניצר; noted on list from 1918)
- El Lissitzky
- Alfred Lomnitz (noted on list from 1930)
- Hans Luckhardt (noted on list from 1925)
- Wassili Luckhardt (noted on list from 1925)

==== M ====
- Thilo Maatsch (noted on list from 1930)
- Ewald Mataré (noted on list from 1925 and 1930)
- Max Hermann Maxy (noted on list from 1925 and 1930)
- Ludwig Meidner (noted on list from 1918)
- Moriz Melzer (noted on list from 1918, 1925 and 1930)
- Erich Mendelsohn (noted on list from 1918)
- Carlo Mense (noted on list from 1925 and 1930)
- Oskar Moll
- Ludwig Mies van der Rohe (noted on list from 1925)
- Otto Möller (noted on list from 1918, 1925 and 1930)
- Rudolf Möller (noted on list from 1918, 1925 and 1930)
- László Moholy-Nagy (noted on list from 1930)
- Georg Muche (noted on list from 1930)
- Albert Mueller (noted on list from 1925 and 1930)
- Otto Mueller (noted on list from 1918)

==== N ====
- Otto Nagel (noted on list from 1930)
- Ernest Neuschul (noted on list from 1930)

==== O ====
- Jacobus Oud (noted on list from 1925 and 1930)

==== P ====
- Max Pechstein (noted on list from 1918)
- Felix Petyrek (noted on list from 1925)
- Hans Poelzig (noted on list from 1925)
- Fritz Pollack (noted on list from 1930)
- Enrico Prampolini (noted on list from 1925)
- Ivan Puni (noted on list from 1930)
- Carl Puxkandl (noted on list from 1925 and 1930)

==== R ====
- Franz Radziwill (noted on list from 1930)
- Anne Ratkowski
- Hilla von Rebay
- Walter Reger (noted on list from 1925 and 1930)
- Hans Richter (noted on list from 1918 and 1930)
- Heinrich Richter (noted on list from 1918, 1925 and 1930)
- Joachim Ringelnatz (noted on list from 1930)
- Karl Rössing (noted on list from 1930)
- Christian Rohlfs (noted on list from 1930)
- Berti Rosenberg (noted on list from 1925)
- Kurt Hermann Rosenberg (noted on list from 1925 and 1930)
- Walter Ruttmann (noted on list from 1925 and 1930)

==== S ====
- Hans Scharoun
- Edwin Scharff (noted on list from 1918)
- Margarete Scheel (noted on list from 1918)
- Hermann Scherchen (noted on list from 1930)
- Oskar Schlemmer (noted on list from 1925)
- Rudolf Schlichter (noted on list from 1930)
- Wilhelm Schmid (noted on list from 1918, 1925 and 1930)
- Paul Schmolling (noted on list from 1925 and 1930)
- Georg Schrimpf (noted on list from 1918, 1925 and 1930)
- Richard Schrötter (noted on list from 1930)
- Kurt Schwerdtfeger (noted on list from 1930)
- Kurt Schwitters (noted on list from 1918)
- Arthur Segal (noted on list from 1925 and 1930)
- Lasar Segall (noted on list from 1925 and 1930)
- Hans Soeder (noted on list from 1925 and 1930)
- Meta Speier (noted on list from 1930)
- Hans Spiegel (noted on list from 1925 and 1930)
- Walter Spies
- Mart Stam (noted on list from 1925 and 1930)
- Heinrich Stegemann (noted on list from 1925)
- Milly Steger (noted on list from 1918)
- Gertrud Stemmler (noted on list from 1925 and 1930)
- Irma Stern
- Franz Stock (noted on list from 1925 and 1930)
- William Straube (noted on list from 1918)
- Fritz Stuckenberg (noted on list from 1930)
- Hans Heinz Stuckenschmidt (noted on list from 1930)

==== T ====
- Georg Tappert (noted on list from 1918, 1925 and 1930)
- Bruno Taut (noted on list from 1925)
- Max Taut (noted on list from 1925)
- Heinrich Tessenow (noted on list from 1925)
- Heinz Tiessen(noted on list from 1925)
- Eduard Trautner (noted on list from 1925)

==== U ====
- Rudolf Utzinger (noted on list from 1925)

==== V ====
- Karl Völker (noted on list from 1925 and 1930)
- Wladimir Rudolfowitsch Vogel (noted on list from 1930)

==== W ====
- Nicolai Wassiliew (noted on list from 1930)
- Vincent Weber (noted on list from 1930)
- Kurt Weill (noted on list from 1925 and 1930)
- Ines Wetzel (noted on list from 1930)
- Gustav Wiethüchter (noted on list from 1930)
- Carel Willink
- Gert Wollheim
- Stefan Wolpe (noted on list from 1930)

==== Z ====
- Willy Zierath (noted on list from 1918)

== Literature ==
- Helga Kliemann: Die Novembergruppe. Gebr. Mann, Berlin 1969.
- Galerie Nierendorf: Künstler der Novembergruppe. Ausstellungskatalog Galerie Nierendorf, Berlin 1985.
- Galerie Bodo Niemann: Die Novembergruppe. Ausstellungskatalog Galerie Niemann, Berlin 1993. ISBN 3-926298-21-9
- Will Grohmann (Hrsg.): 10 Jahre Novembergruppe. Sonderheft der Kunst der Zeit. Klinkhardt&Biermann, Berlin 3.1928, 1-3.
- Paul Bekker: Wesensformen der Musik. Veröffentlichung der Novembergruppe. B. Lachmann, Berlin 1925.
- Max Butting: Musikgeschichte, die ich miterlebte. Henschel, Berlin 1955.
- Christoph Wilhelmi: Künstlergruppen in Deutschland, Österreich und der Schweiz seit 1900. Ein Handbuch, Stuttgart 1996
- Irene Below: Between Africa and Europe in Irma Stern: Expressions of a Journey, Standard Bank Gallery, Johannesburg, 2003
