= Richard Döcker =

German architect and professor

Richard Döcker (13 June 1894, Weilheim an der Teck - 9 November 1968, Stuttgart) was a German architect and professor associated with the functionalist style in architecture.

== Biography ==
Döcker studied architecture from 1912 to 1918 at the University of Stuttgart, graduating with honors. From 1914 to 1917 he was a volunteer in World War I. In 1921 he passed his Staatsexamen in Stuttgart, and from 1922 to 1924 he was an assistant for Paul Bonatz at the University of Stuttgart, where he received his doctorate, on the architecture of homes.

In 1926, he joined Der Ring, an artist's society, and in 1927 was appointed as construction manager of the Weissenhof Estate in Stuttgart, a modern architectural project supervised by Mies van der Rohe. He became a member of the Deutscher Werkbund in 1928, and in that same year collaborated on the Congrès International d'Architecture Moderne.

From 1939 to 1941, he studied biology at the University of Stuttgart, and until 1944 performed military duty in Saarbrücken. He was appointed general construction director of Stuttgart, a position he gave up the next year after disagreements with the city's lord mayor, Arnulf Klett. He was elected regional president of the newly reformed Bund Deutscher Architekten. From 1947 to 1960 he was professor of city planning and reconstruction at the University of Stuttgart and chair of the architecture department; in 1957 he became a member of the Akademie der Künste in Berlin. He also taught at the Karlsruhe Institute of Technology, in 1958. He retired as emeritus in 1960.

== Bibliography ==
- Friederike Mehlau-Wiebking: Richard Döcker. Ein Architekt im Aufbruch zur Moderne. Vieweg, Braunschweig, Wiesbaden 1989, ISBN 3-528-08725-0.
- Dieter Kimpel, Dietrich Worbs (eds.): Richard Döcker 1894–1968. Ein Kolloquium zum 100. Geburtstag. Stuttgart 1996, ISBN 3-926269-20-0.
