= Hans Luckhardt =

Hans Luckhardt (16 June 1890 in Berlin-Charlottenburg – 8 October 1954 in Bad Wiessee) was a German architect and the brother of Wassili Luckhardt, with whom he worked his entire life. He studied at the University of Karlsruhe with Hermann Billing and was a member of the Novembergruppe, the Arbeitsrats für Kunst, and the Glass Chain. Together with Anton Lorenz, he designed furniture in the 1920s and 1930s, predominantly steel-tube and moveable chairs.

== Life ==
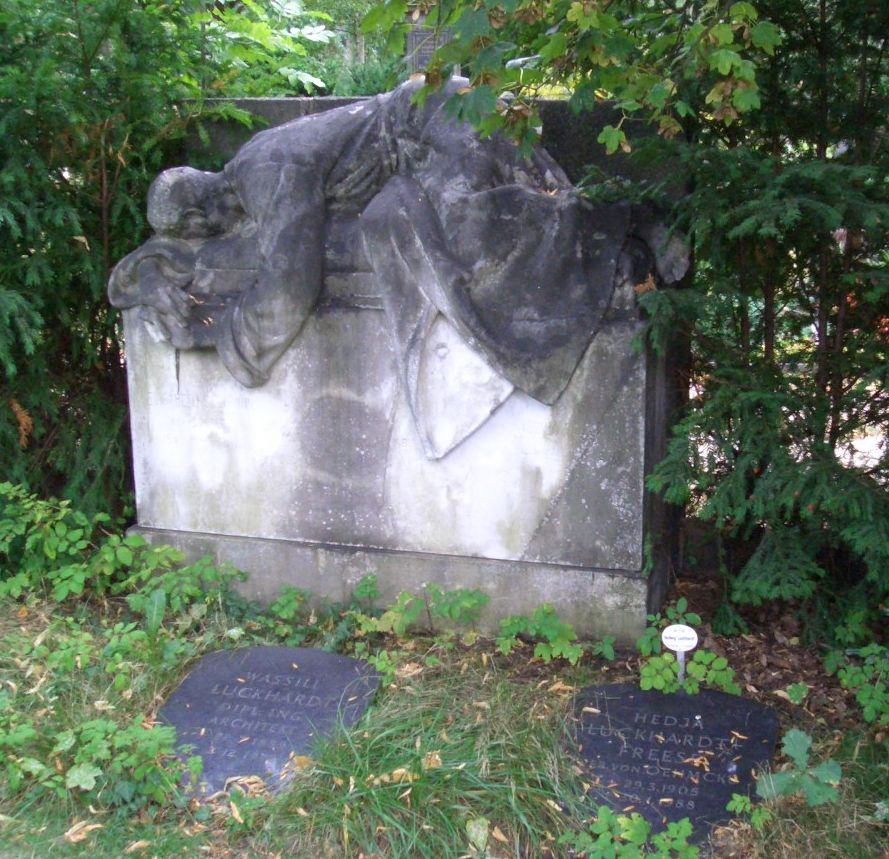
Grave in Berlin-Kreuzberg, with his brother Wassili Luckhardt (it's a bought classic grave of 1905, the so-called Grave Shishin)

From 1921 until his death he was in practice with his brother Wassili. From 1924 to 1934 their practice was also shared with Alfons Anker.

In the 1920s the brothers were among the world's top architects. Originally Expressionists, they later turned to Modernism. Their buildings are typical examples of Modernism, with skeletons of steel or reinforced concrete.

During the Nazism era, the Luckhardt brothers tried initially to reconcile their architecture with the new ruling powers, even joining the Nazi Party. It quickly became apparent, however, that the new regime required a different architectural language. They were professionally disqualified, and only built three single-family houses during this period; the exteriors were made to blend in with the preferred style of the Nazi era.

After World War II they tried to return to their pre-war work. From 1952 to his death, Hans was a professor at the Berlin State School of Fine Arts.

== Works ==
=== Buildings (selection) ===
- Terraced housing at Schorlemerallee (experimental settlement), Berlin-Zehlendorf (1925–30, alterations)
- Offices at Tauentzienstraße, Stadtküche Kraft, Berlin (1925, destroyed in the war)
- Chrysler-Haus, Berlin (1927, demolished 1961)
- Office at Hirsch, Berlin (1926–27)
- House Buchthal, Berlin-Charlottenburg (1928, later converted and extended)
- Telschow-House, Berlin-Tiergarten (1928–29, destroyed in the war)
- Country house, Kluge, Berlin-Charlottenburg (1929)
- Houses Am Rupenhorn, Berlin (1919–32)
- Country house, Bibersteig, Berlin (1939)
- Berlin Pavilion at the Constructa 1951, Hannover (1951, destroyed)

=== Projects (selection) ===
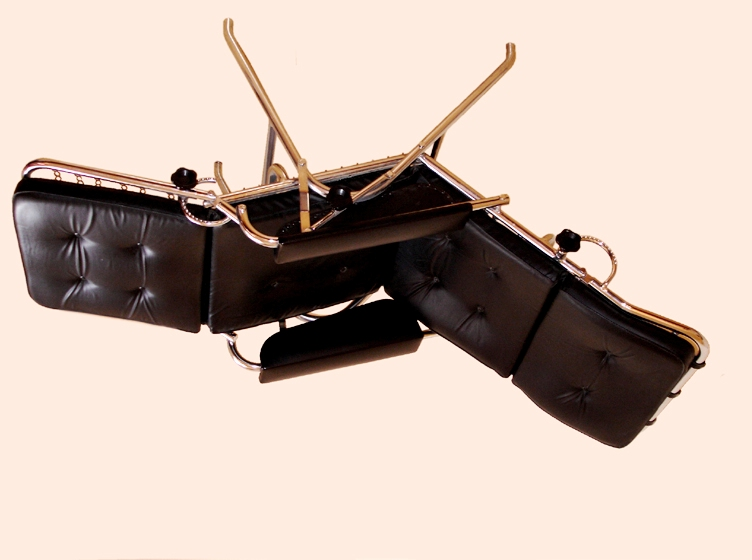
Thonet Siesta Medicinal

- Competition for the German Hygiene Museum, Dresden (1920)
- Competition high-rise building at the railway station Friedrichstraße, Berlin (1922)
- Competition for the redesign of the Alexanderplatz, Berlin (1929)
- Tower-house for the Potsdamer Platz, Berlin (1930)
- Medical University Preßburg (1933)
- Developing the Reclining Chair "Siesta Medicinal" in tubular steel for Thonet (1964)
- Competition "Rund um den Zoo", Berlin (1948)

== Bibliography ==
- Dagmar Nowitzki: Hans und Wassili Luckhardt: Das architektonische Werk. München (1992) ISBN 3-89235-042-6
- Udo Kultermann: Wassili und Hans Luckhardt. Tübingen (1958)
