= Bannetze =

- Ortschaft of Winsen (Aller)
- Interactive map of Bannetze
- Location within Germany Location within Lower Saxony
- Coordinates: 52°40′49″N 9°48′33″E
- Country: Germany
- State: Lower Saxony
- District: Celle
- Municipality: Winsen (Aller)
- Elevation: 33 m (108 ft)
- Time zone: UTC+01:00 (CET)
  - Summer (DST): UTC+02:00 (CEST)
- Postal codes: 29308
- Dialling codes: 05146

Bannetze is a village and Ortschaft (municipal division) on the River Aller in the municipality of Winsen (Aller) in the district of Celle in the north German state of Lower Saxony. The L180 state road passes through the village. The village has under 400 inhabitants.

== Politics ==
The village of Bannetze has a joint council with neighbouring Thören.

The council chair is Heinrich Leymers (CDU).

== Culture and places of interest ==
- The Bannetze Weir on the Aller (Allerwehr Bannetze) is the second barrage on the Aller below Celle and was built between 1909 and 1912. The old weir was replaced after almost 100 years by a modern, inflatable weir. The weir has a lock and a fishway.
- The school house in Bannetze is a free-standing two-storey school house with an annex. A preliminary draft was first published in 1910 and the construction was carried out by Otto Haesler in 1911.
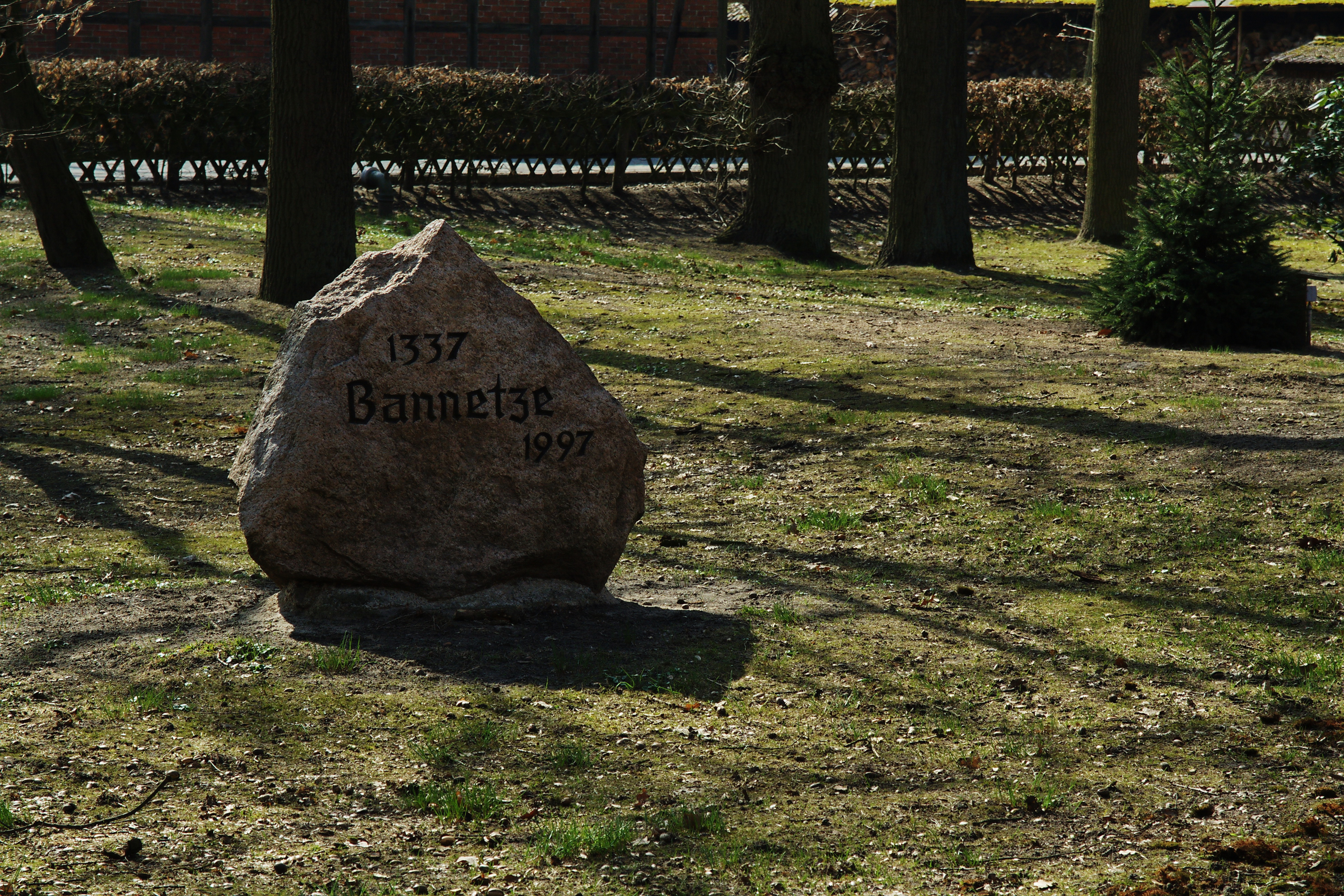
The village monument

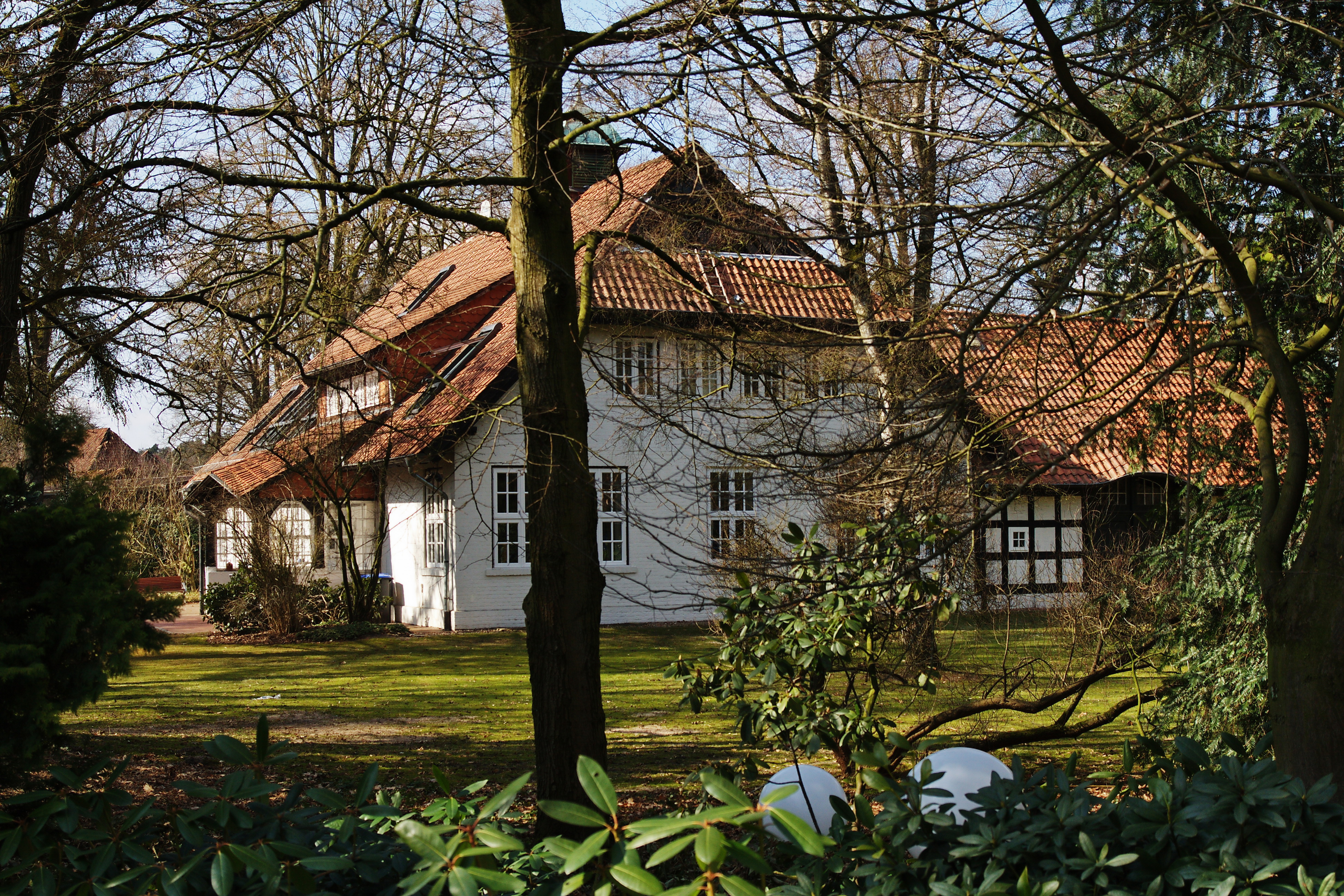
The old village school

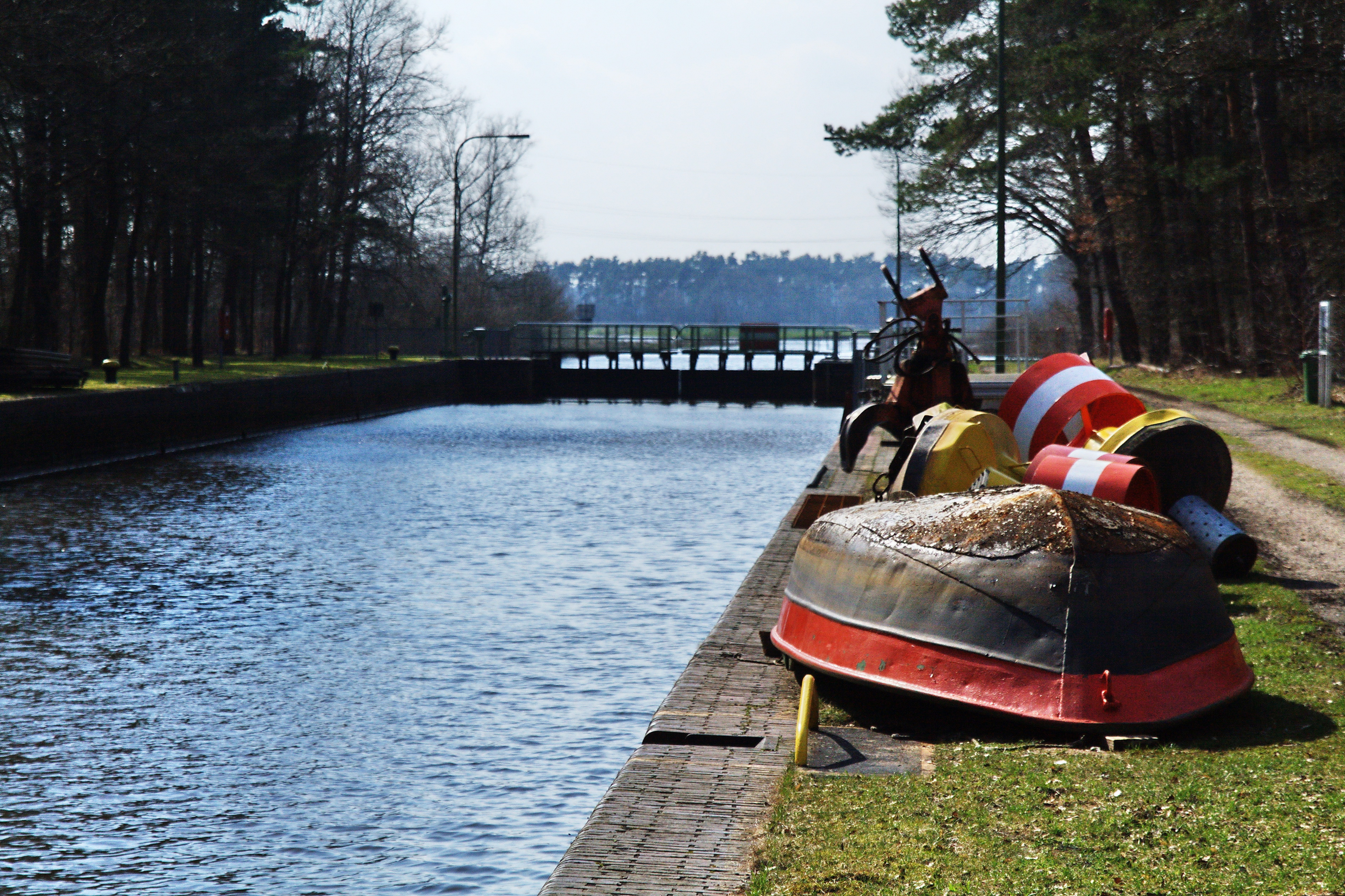
The lock

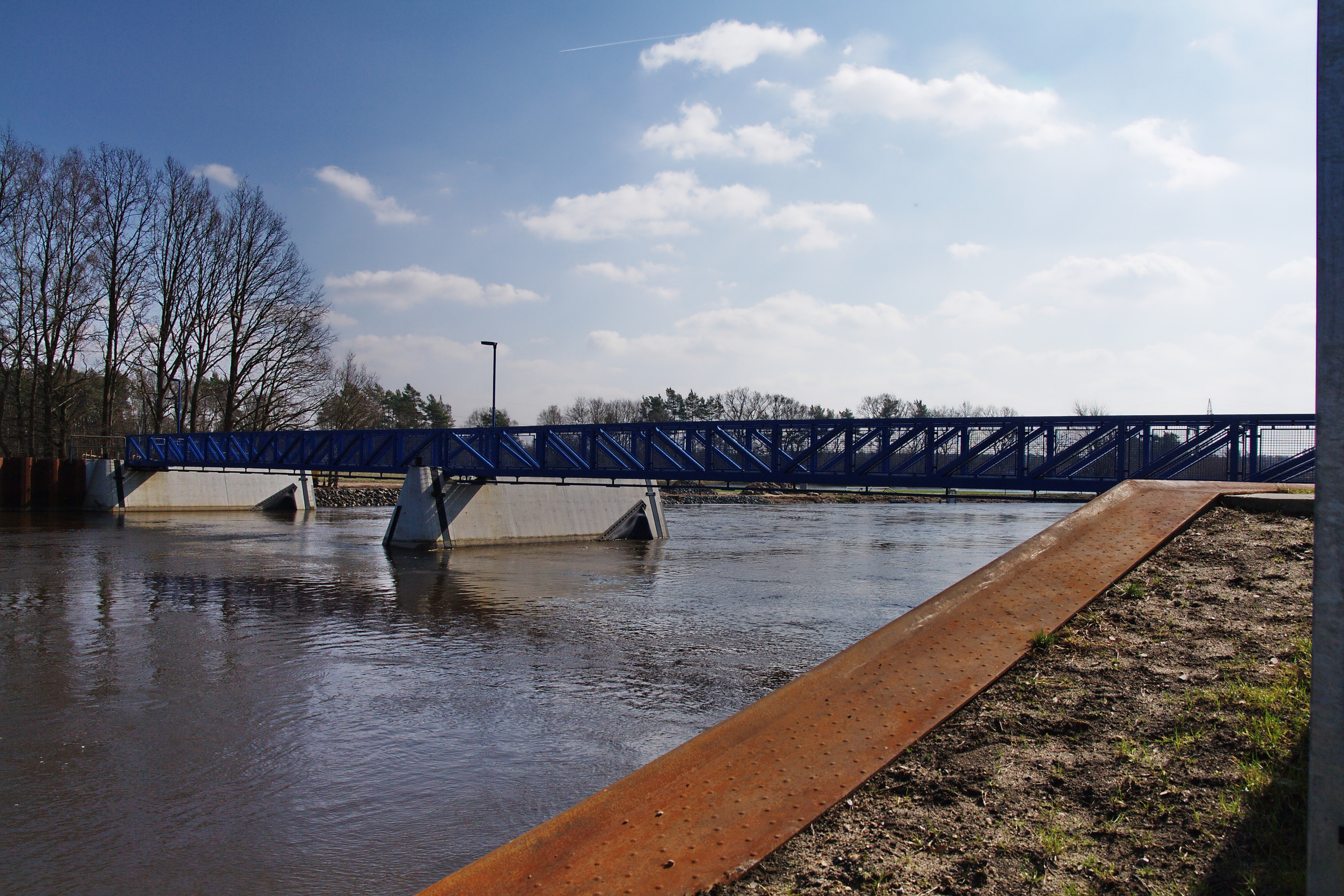
The Aller Weir
