= Hugo Häring =

German architect and architectural writer

- Born: May 11, 1882; Biberach an der Riß, Kingdom of Württemberg, German Empire
- Died: May 17, 1958 (aged 76); Göppingen, West Germany
- Occupation: Architect
- Spouses: Emilia Unda, Roma Bahn

Hugo Häring (11 May 1882 – 17 May 1958) was a German architect and architectural writer best known for his writings on "organic architecture", and as a figure in architectural debates about functionalism in the 1920s and 1930s, though he had an important role as an expressionist architect.

Häring was born in Biberach an der Riß, in the Kingdom of Württemberg. A student of the great Theodor Fischer, he took the view that each building should be uniquely developed according to the specific demands of the site and client. Few of Häring's designs were built but he was a strong influence on his friend and colleague Hans Scharoun. One built design was a contribution to the Siemensstadt housing project in Berlin from 1929 through 1931, which was master-planned by Scharoun.

Häring was a founding member of both The Ring and CIAM. He was married to actress Emilia Unda in 1918. The couple later divorced and he married actress Roma Bahn in 1950. He died in Göppingen, aged 76.

== Buildings ==
- 1922–1928: Gut Garkau in Scharbeutz
- 1926/1927: Buildings in the Onkel-Tom-Siedlung in Berlin-Zehlendorf
- 1929/1930: Ring-Siedlung in Berlin-Siemensstadt
- 1929–1931: Prinzenallee/Gotenburger Straße and Stockholmer Straße in Berlin-Gesundbrunnen
- 1931/1932: Duplex Vietingergasse 71/72 in the Wiener Werkbundsiedlung in Vienna-Lainz
- 1931/1932: Doppelhaus Engelbrechtweg 4 in the Wiener Werkbundsiedlung] in Vienna-Lainz (1945 destroyed, new built by Roland Rainer)
- 1938: Landhaus v. Prittwitz in Tutzing
- 1950: Hugo-Häring-Häuser in Biberach an der Riß

== Bibliography ==
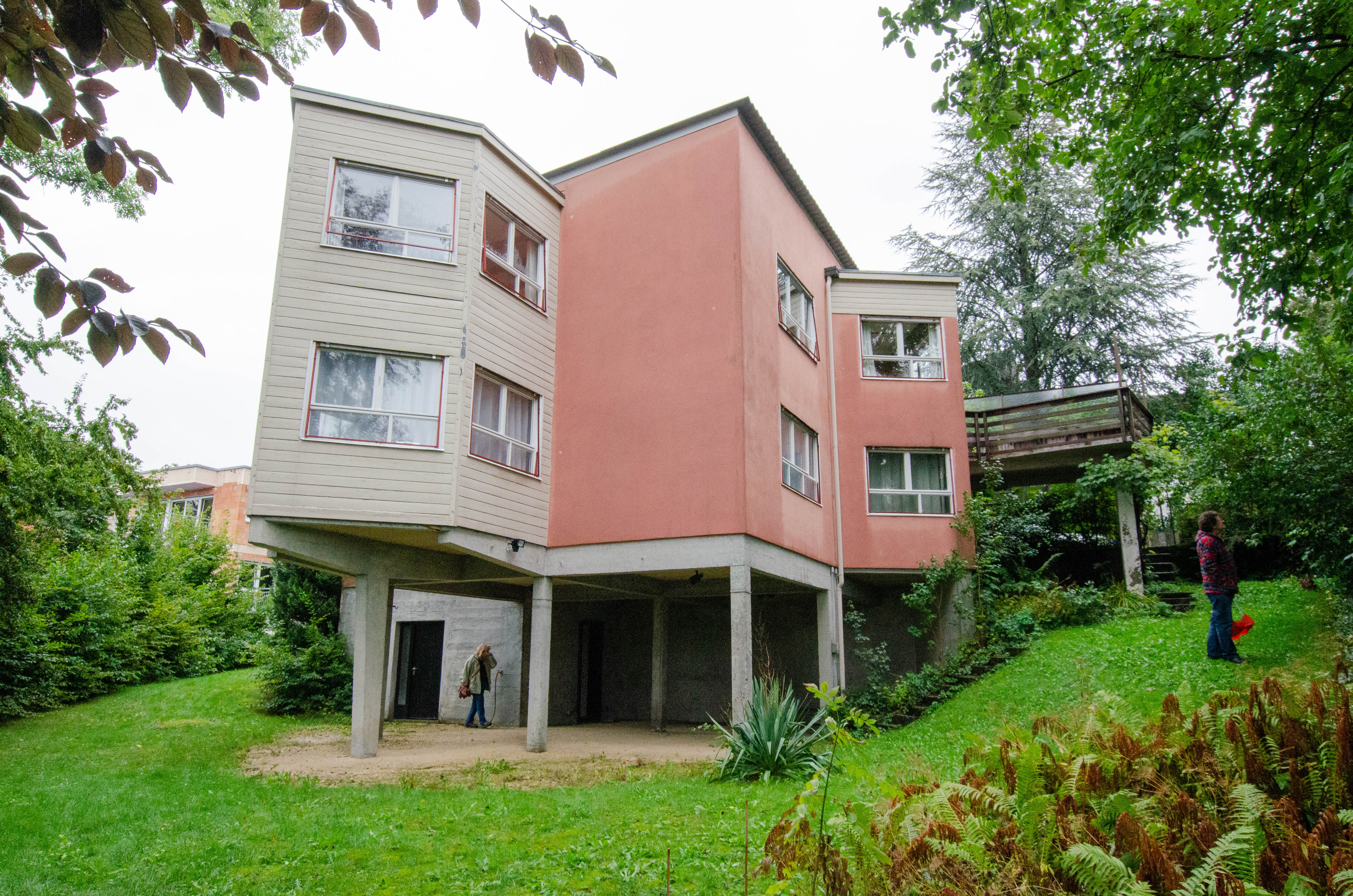
Hugo-Häring-Haus, 2019

- M. Aschenbrenner, P. Blundell-Jones, Hugo Häring – the Organic versus the Geometric, Edition Axel Menges, 1999
- P. Blundell-Jones, Hugo Häring – New Buildings, Cambridge University Press, 2003
- Jose-Manuel GARCÍA ROIG, "Tres arquitectos alemanes. Bruno Taut. Hugo Häring. Martin Wagner", ISBN 978-84-8448-288-8, Valladolid (Spain), 2004, Universidad de Valladolid, Secretariado de Publicaciones
