= Glass Chain =

The Glass Chain or Crystal Chain sometimes known as the "Utopian Correspondence" (German: Die Gläserne Kette) was a chain letter that took place between November 1919 and December 1920. It was a correspondence of architects that formed a basis of expressionist architecture in Germany. It was initiated by Bruno Taut.

== Names, pen-names, and locations of participants ==
| Name | pen-name | location |
|---|---|---|
| Wilhelm Brückman | Brexbach | Emden |
| Hermann Finsterlin | Prometh | Stuttgart |
| Paul Gösch | Tancred | Berlin |
| Jakobus Göttel | Stellarius | Cologne |
| Walter Gropius | Maß | Weimar |
| Wenzel Hablik | W.H. | Itzehoe |
| Hans Hansen | Antischmitz | Cologne |
| Carl Krayl | Anfang | Tuttlingen |
| Wassili Luckhardt | Zacken | Berlin |
| Hans Luckhardt | Angkor | Berlin |
| Hans Scharoun | Hannes | Insterburg |
| Bruno Taut | Glas | Berlin |
| Max Taut | No Name | Berlin |

== Bibliography ==
- Sharp, Dennis (1966). Modern Architecture and Expressionism. George Braziller: New York.
- Whyte, Iain Boyd ed. (1985). Crystal Chain Letters: Architectural Fantasies by Bruno Taut and His Circle. The MIT Press. ISBN 0-262-23121-2
- Benson, Timothy. O.; Dimenberg, Edward; et al. (2001-09-17). Expressionist Utopias: Paradise, Metropolis, Architectural Fantasy (Weimar and Now: German Cultural Criticism). University of California Press. ISBN 0-520-23003-5.
