= Arbeitsrat für Kunst =

Soviet artisan union

The Arbeitsrat für Kunst (German: 'Workers council for art' or 'Art Soviet') was a union of architects, painters, sculptors and art writers, who were based in Berlin from 1918 to 1921. It developed as a response to the workers' and soldiers' councils and was dedicated to bringing current developments and trends in architecture and art to a broader population.

The Arbeitsrat worked closely with the Novembergruppe and the Deutscher Werkbund. Some of the architects represented in the Arbeitsrat united in the Glass Chain, or joined the correspondence group, Der Ring. Many members were important founders of the Bauhaus. Individual members informed the most important German academy of art of the time, the Staatliche Akademie für Kunst und Kunstgewerbe Breslau, as well as the Bauhaus.

== Aims ==
Art and the people must form an entity. Art shall no longer be a luxury of the few but should be enjoyed and experienced by the broad masses. The aim is an alliance of the arts under the wing of great architecture. Flyer dated March 1st 1919

Their demands were: the acknowledgment of all tasks of building as public and not private tasks, the abolition of all official privileges, the establishment of community centers as places to exchange art and ideas, the dissolution of the Academy of the arts and the Prussian national art commission, the release of architectural, plastics, painting and handicraft commissions from national patronage, the promotion of museums as education places, the removal of artistically worthless monuments and the formation of a state body to oversee and promote education in the arts.

The Arbeitsrat reacted to the unpalatable situation concerning orders for young architects, who were lost in the First world war.

== Actions ==
The Arbeitsrat recruited the public to participate in its art and architectural exhibitions and publications. Its exhibitions were open for non-architects and also for non-members of the group to take part, with designs, models, sketches and sculptures.

=== Exhibitions ===
- "Ausstellung für unbekannte Architekten",(Exhibition for unknown architects ) Berlin und Weimar, 1919
- "Neues Bauen" (New building), Berlin, 1920

=== Publications ===
- Bruno Taut: Ein Architektur-Programm. (An architectural programme) Berlin 1918
- Paul Rudolf Henning: Ton. Ein Aufruf von P. R. Henning. Zweite Flugschrift des Arbeitsrats für Kunst (Clay/tone/sound. A call by P.R. Henning. Second Pamphlet of the work advice for art ). Berlin ca. 1918
- Arbeitsrat für Kunst (Hrsg.): Arbeitsrat für Kunst. Flugblatt (Arbeitsrat für Kunst. Leaflet). Envelope with woodcut by Max Pechstein, Berlin 1919
- Arbeitsrat für Kunst (Hrsg.): Ja! Stimmen des Arbeitsrates für Kunst in Berlin (Yes! Voices of the Art Society in Berlin). Berlin 1919
- Arbeitsrat für Kunst (Hrsg.): Ruf zum Bauen: zweite Buchpublikation des Arbeiterrats für Kunst (Call for building: Second book publication of the Arbeitsrats für Kunst). Berlin 1920
- Otto Bartning: Ein Unterrichtsplan für Architektur und bildende Künste (An instruction plan for architecture and the visual arts)
