= Strempel =

Strempel is a surname. Notable people with the surname include:

- Eileen Strempel, American soprano and author
- Erwin Strempel (1924–1999), German footballer
- Geoff Strempel, Australian librarian, retiring director of the State Library of South Australia in 2024
- Horst Strempel (1904–1975), German painter and graphic artist
- Shane Strempel (born 1969), Australian rules footballer
