= Staatliche Akademie für Kunst und Kunstgewerbe Breslau =

Coordinates: 51°06′41.11″N 17°02′37.27″E

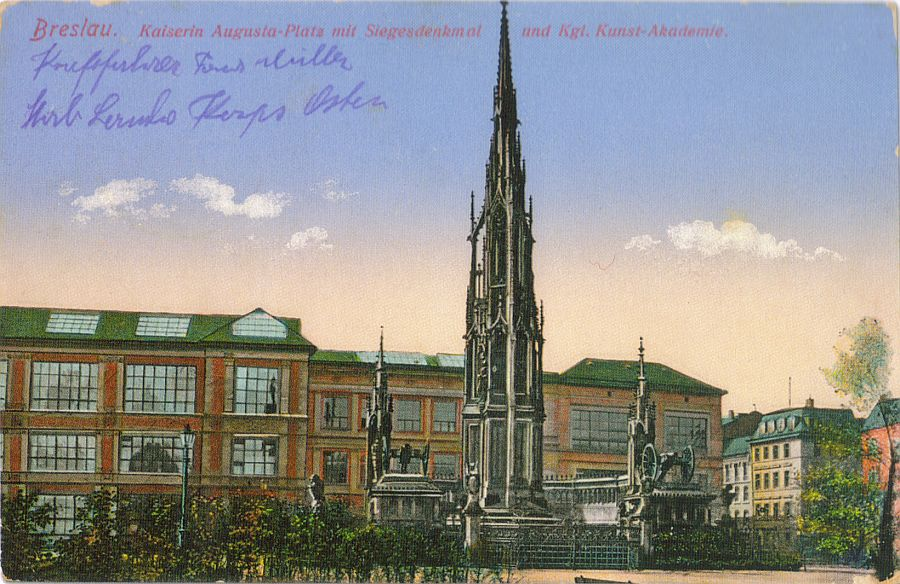
Breslauer Akademie on the Kaiserin-Augusta-Platz (now Plac Polski) with the war memorial on a 1916 postcard.

The Staatliche Akademie für Kunst und Kunstgewerbe (State Academy for Art and Crafts) was an art, architecture and craft academy in Breslau, Prussia (now Wrocław in Poland).

It originated in 1911 from the Royal Art and Craft School (Königlichen Kunst- und Gewerbeschule) on the Kaiserin-Augusta-Platz, which had itself been founded in 1791. Its first director was Hans Poelzig, under whom the School was promoted to the rank of Academy. As a result of the second Prussian Notverordnung it closed on 1 April 1932. After that closure classes continued in masters' studios for about a year.

== Selected tutors ==
- Robert Bednorz
- Wanda Bibrowicz (1904–1911) textile tutor
- Albrecht Bräuer (1830–1897), professor and tutor of freehand drawing
- Arnold Busch (1901–1924, tutor of head drawing and figure drawing)
- Gertrude Daubert (from 1911 director of textile classes, together with Else Wislicenus)
- Paul Dobers
- August Endell (from 1918 director)
- Markus van Gosen
- Theodor von Gosen (1903–1932)
- Robert Härtel (from 1878)
- Karl Hanusch (1909–1922)
- Georg Paul Heyduck (1930–1932, teacher training)
- Paul Holz (from 1925)
- Eduard Kaempffer (1895–1924, Professor of Nature Drawing and Figure Painting)
- Alexander Kanoldt (1925–1931)
- Konrad von Kardorff (1920–1927)
- Hermann Kühn (1849–1902, from 1881 director)
- Carlo Mense (from 1925)
- Oskar Moll (1918–1932, from 1926 director)
- Johann (Johannes) Ernst Ludwig Molzahn (1928–1933)
- Otto Mueller (from 1919–1930)
- Georg Muche (1931–1932, Professor of Painting)
- Fryderyk Pautsch, 1912–1919
- Hans Poelzig (1900–1916, from 1903 as director of the Art and Craft School, from 1911 as director of art and crafts)
- Adolf Rading (1919–1923 Employee of August Endell; 1923–1932, Professor for Architecture and Craft)
- Hans Rossmann (1903–1912, Professor of Decorative Drawing and Painting, Workshop Director for Glass Painting)
- Hans Scharoun (1925–1932, Professor of Architecture)
- Hugo Scheinert (1902–1924, Professor of Drawing and Calligraphy)
- Oskar Schlemmer (1929–1932)
- Ignatius Taschner (1903)
- Jo Vinecky
- Li Vinecky-Thorn
- Albert Werner-Schwarzburg (1857–1911), from 1899
- Else Wislicenus (from 1911 director of textile classes)
- Max Wislicenus (from 1896)

== Selected students ==
- Thuro Balzer (1900–1904)
- Herbert Blaschke (until 1923)
- Emil Bartoschek (1925–1932)
- Willibald Besta (1905–1907)
- Alexander Camaro (1920–1925)
- Hans Bimler (1887)
- Richard Böhnke
- Hertha Degn (1929–1931)
- Hermann Diesener (1920–1930)
- Walter Ebeling
- Fritz Erler (from 1886)
- Willy Exel (1910–1912)
- Johnny Friedlaender (1928–1930)
- Max Friese
- Hans Hacker
- Moritz Hadda (1911–1913)
- Gerhart Hauptmann (1880–1882 sculpture class)
- Max Heilmann (1885–?)
- Gerhart Hein (1929–1932)
- Walter Herzberg (1923–1925)
- Georg Paul Heyduck 1913–1916 und 1919–1921
- Helmut Hofmann
- Willy Jaeckel (1906–1908)
- Else Jaskolla (1904–1906)
- Elisabeth Jaspersen (1924–?)
- Margarete Knüppelholz-Roeser
- Walther Kohlhase (1928–1931)
- Hanna Koschinsky (until 1904)
- Heinrich Lauterbach (from 1911)
- Hans Leistikow
- Arnold Lyongrün
- Otto Martin (1891/92)
- Ludwig Meidner (1903–1905)
- Gerhard Neumann (1925–1927)
- Hans Emil Oberländer (1909–1914)
- Frieda Plew (1909)
- Paul Plontke (1900–1902)
- Walter Rhaue (1918–1919 and other periods)
- Herbert Sandberg (1925–1926)
- Willy Schmidt (1895–1959)
- Hermann Schmiechen (1872–1873)
- Georg Schubert (from 1923)
- Ernst Seger (from 1884)
- Horst Strempel (1923–1927)
- Helmut Thoma (1930–1932)
- Willi Ulfig (1931–1932)
- Heinrich Wolff (1891–1893)

== Group exhibitions ==
- Breslauer Akademieschüler (1922–1932) heute – Kunstforum Ostdeutsche Galerie Regensburg, 1979
- 200 Jahre Kunsthochschule Breslau – Nassauischer Kunstverein, Wiesbaden 1990

== Bibliography (in German) ==
- Kornelia von Berswordt-Wallrabe (ed.): Von Otto Müller bis Oskar Schlemmer. Künstler der Breslauer Akademie. Experiment, Erfahrung, Erinnerung. Staatliches Museum Schwerin, Schwerin 2002, ISBN 3-86106-076-0 (Ausstellungskatalog).
- Johanna Brade: Werkstätten der Moderne. Lehrer und Schüler der Breslauer Akademie 1903–1932. Stekovics, Halle an der Saale 2004, ISBN 3-89923-061-2 (Ausstellungskatalog).
- Johanna Brade: Zwischen Künstlerbohème und Wirtschaftskrise. Otto Müller als Professor der Breslauer Akademie 1919–1930. Oettel, Görlitz u. a. 2004, ISBN 3-932693-84-1.
- Petra Hölscher: Die Akademie für Kunst und Kunstgewerbe zu Breslau. Wege einer Kunstschule 1791–1932 (= Bau + Kunst. Schleswig-holsteinische Schriften zur Kunstgeschichte, 5) Ludwig, Kiel 2003, ISBN 3-933598-50-8. (zugl. Dissertation, Universität Kiel, 1997.) Das Inhaltsverzeichnis steht online, z. B. bei Deutsche Nationalbibliothek.
