= Waldbrunn, Hesse =

Waldbrunn (Westerwald)
- Municipality
- Flag Coat of arms

- Location of Waldbrunn (Westerwald) within Limburg-Weilburg district
- Interactive map of Waldbrunn (Westerwald)
- Location within Germany Location within Hesse
- Coordinates: 50°31′N 08°07′E
- Country: Germany
- State: Hesse
- Admin. region: Gießen
- District: Limburg-Weilburg

Government
  - Mayor (2020–26): Peter Blum (Ind.)

Area
  - Total: 29.77 km^{2} (11.49 sq mi)
- Elevation: 240–425 m (787–1,394 ft)

Population (2025-12-31)
  - Total: 5,865
  - Density: 197.0/km^{2} (510.3/sq mi)
- Time zone: UTC+01:00 (CET)
  - Summer (DST): UTC+02:00 (CEST)
- Postal codes: 65620
- Dialling codes: 06479, 06436 (Ellar, Hausen)
- Vehicle registration: LM, WEL
- Website: www.waldbrunn.de

Waldbrunn (Westerwald) (German pronunciation: [ˈvaltˌbʁʊn]) is a municipality in Limburg-Weilburg district in Hesse, Germany.

== Geography ==
=== Location ===
The community lies in the southern Westerwald. Within the municipal area rises the Kerkerbach, which flows through the centres of Fussingen and Lahr. The Lasterbach flows through the centres of Ellar and Hausen after rising on the nearby Knoten (mountain).

=== Neighbouring communities ===
Other communities bordering on Waldbrunn are, clockwise from the north, Mengerskirchen, Merenberg, Beselich, Hadamar, Elbtal, Dornburg and Neunkirchen.

=== Constituent communities ===
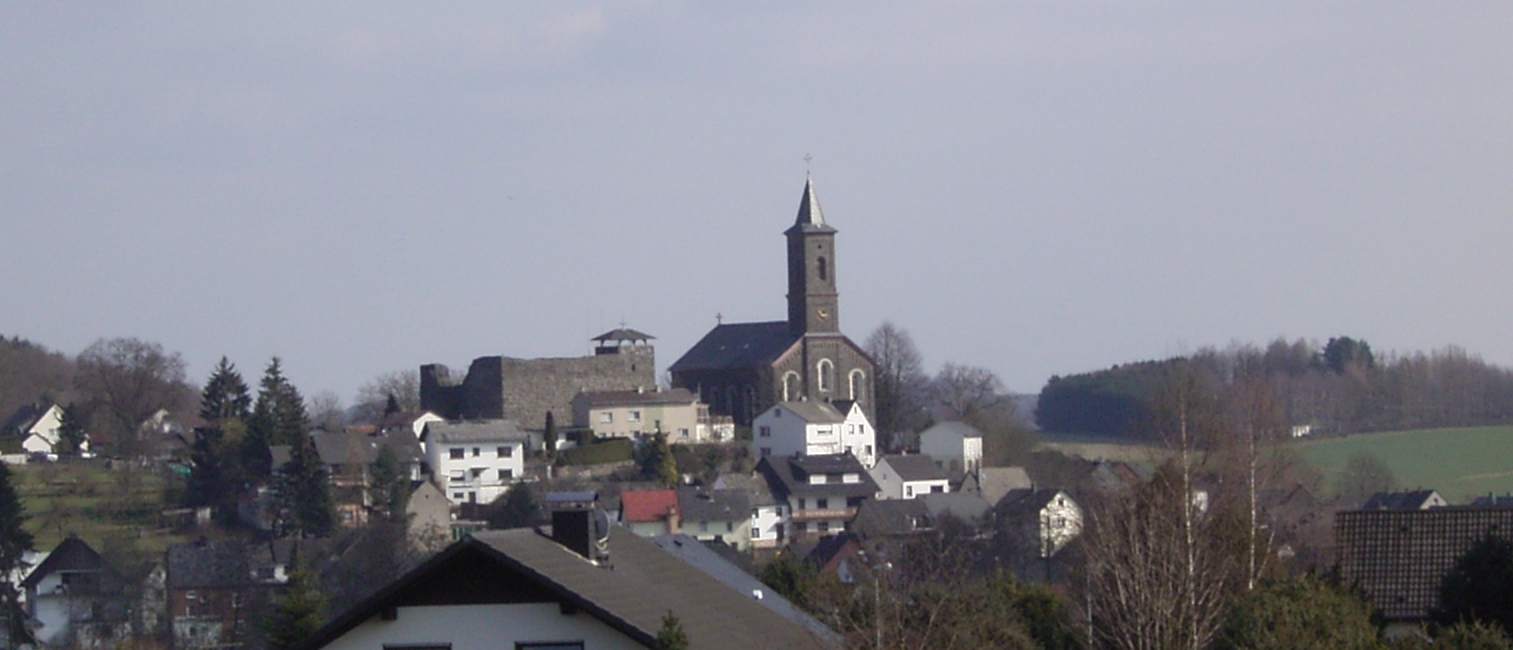
View from Ellar of the church and castle

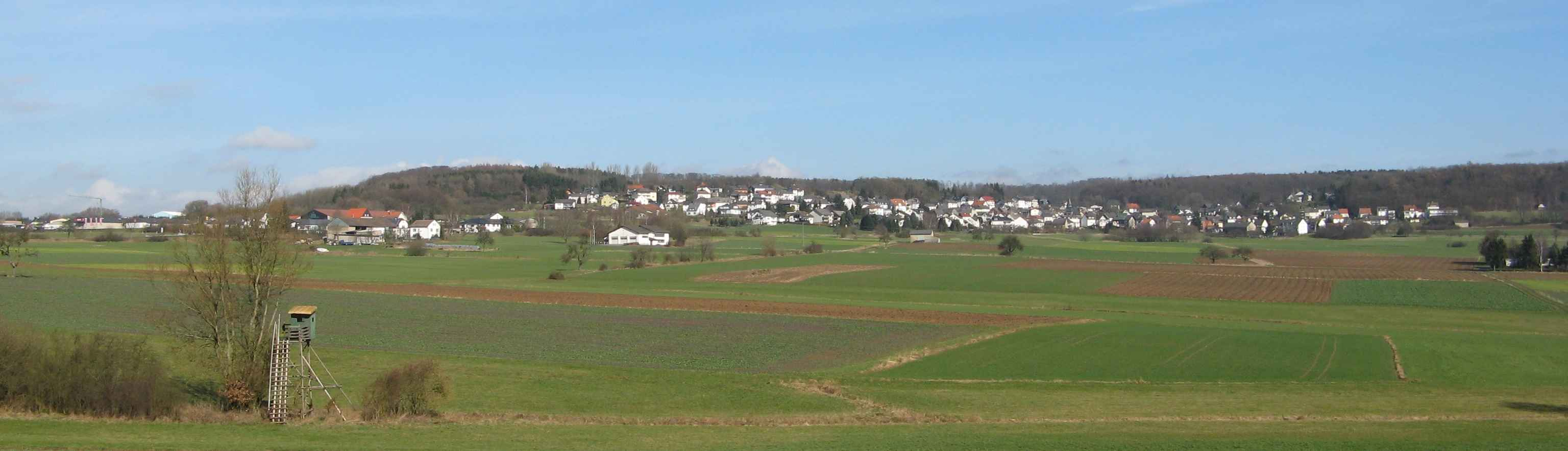
Panorama of Fussingen

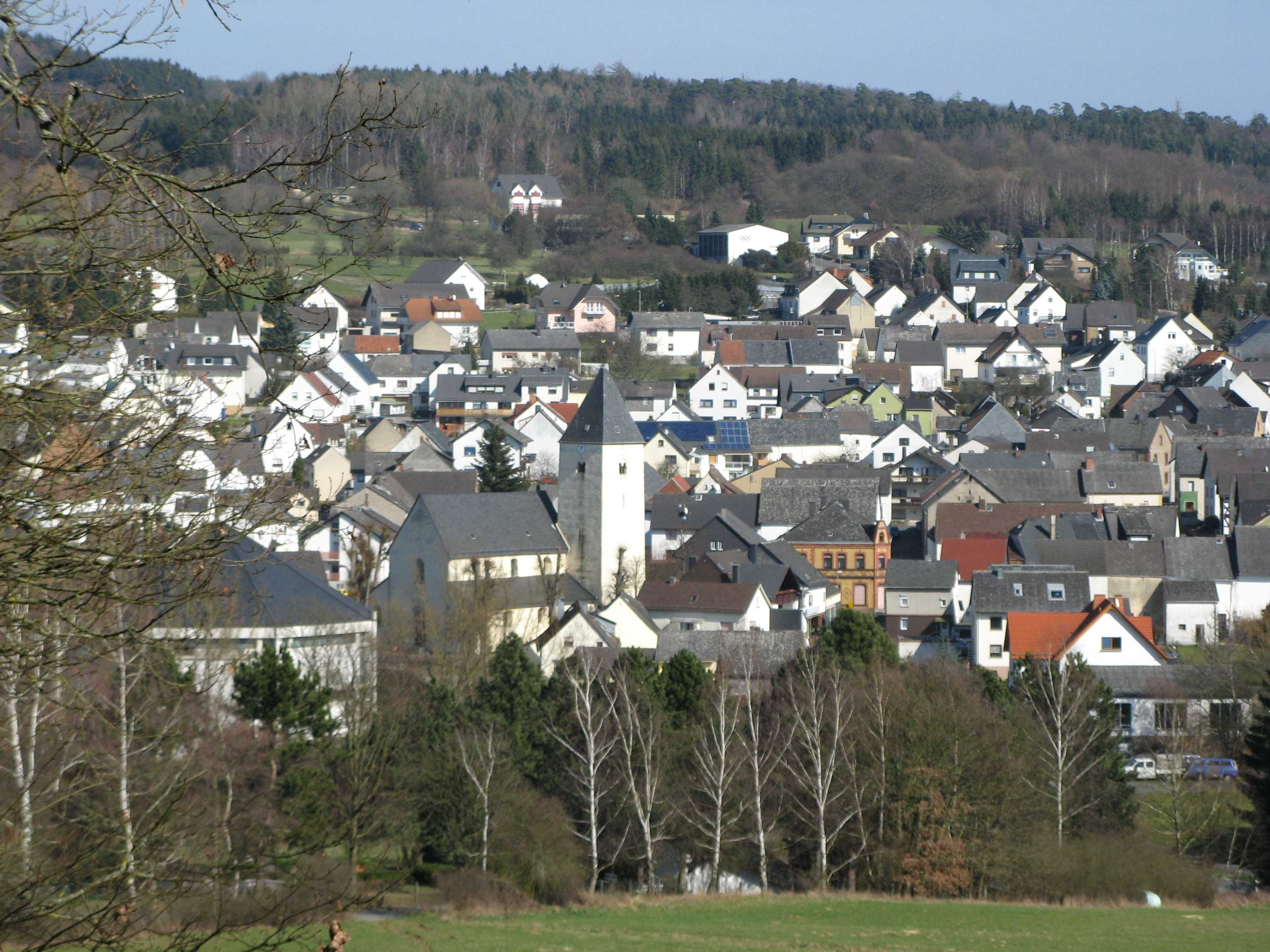
Panorama of Lahr

The community consists of five Ortsteile. The numbering was arranged so that the centre with the community's main postal station was given the number 1. The others were then numbered clockwise.

No.	Constituent community	Inhabitants 1969	Inhabitants 1986	Inhabitants 2006
1	Ellar	933	1,130	1,489
2	Hausen	1,010	1,173	1,419
3	Fussingen	575	705	809
4	Lahr	1,179	1,333	1,438
5	Hintermeilingen	981	1,099	1,313

The community's administrative seat is Fussingen. On a few maps, the community is marked as Schlagmühle, although this actually belongs to Hintermeilingen.

== History ==
The community of Waldbrunn is largely coëxtensive with the former parish and tithing area of Lahr, one of four that once belonged to the Amt of Ellar. The three other parishes were the tithing areas of Frickhofen, Elsoff and Niederzeuzheim (known collectively as the Vier Centen).

Until 1815, the centre of Waldernbach (nowadays part of the community of Mengerskirchen) also belonged to the parish of Lahr along with the now forsaken centres of Wehnaue/Winnau, Wenigen-Reynderroytchen, Brotelbach, Brechtelbach, Gralshofen and Oberhof.

The oldest trace of man in what is now the community is an urnfield grave from the Bronze Age near Fussingen. After the Ubii migrated from the area in 38 BC, it was settled by the Usipeti.

In Frankish times, the Amt of Ellar with its four tithing areas belonged to the Niederlahngau under the Counts of Diez. In 1337, they sold the Counts of Katzenelnbogen this Amt. In 1401, Gerhard Kelner appears as the first Keller (a kind of estate manager) of the County of Katzenelnbogen in Ellar.

From 1491 comes the oldest preserved print of the Ellar court's seal, which later yielded today's civic coat of arms. The court was dedicated to St. Maximinus. The Amt of Ellar found itself in Nassau-Dillenburg's hands in 1557.

Through a bequest-sharing agreement, the Amt of Ellar passed to Nassau-Hadamar in 1607. In 1609, Greden, mentioned as "Rörichs Johanns Weib" (that is to say, his "woman", although the word is cognate with the English "wife") from Ellar, was put to death in Hadamar after having been found guilty of being a witch.

The villages in the Amt of Ellar became Catholic again in 1630, whereupon Prince Johann Ludwig of Nassau-Hadamar authorized the Jesuits. A Plague epidemic swept through the Amt of Ellar in 1636 and 1637. The village of Obersdorf was wiped out utterly without a single villager surviving. Many other villages lost most of their people. The Jesuit priest Rutger Hesselmann took it upon himself to care for the sick. He died of the Plague on 30 April 1637. The upheaval brought about by the Thirty Years' War led to considerable losses in the surrounding centres. Besides plunderings by soldiers moving through the area, the people also suffered food shortages and many outbreaks of illness.

In 1736 came an uprising in the villages of Dillhausen, Dorchheim, Dorndorf, Ellar, Fussingen, Frickhofen, Hausen, Hintermeilingen, Mühlbach, Lahr, Langendernbach, Probbach, Waldernbach, Wilsenroth and Winkels against the war tax that Prince Christian of Nassau-Dillenburg had imposed on them. The uprising went down in history as the Klöppelstreit ("Clapper Dispute"). The uprising was quelled by Dillenburg and Weilburg soldiers.

With boundary adjustments in Orange-Nassau in 1790, the new Amt of Ellar was founded. It comprised the parishes of Lahr und Frickhofen.

In 1806, the Amt of Ellar was made part of the Grand Duchy of Berg. All today's constituent communities belonged to the Mairie of Lahr in the Canton of Hadamar, which in turn belonged to the Arrondissement of Dillenburg and thereby also to the Département of Sieg. In 1815, the Grand Duchy of Berg was awarded to the Kingdom of Prussia. Prussia, however, exchanged the Mairie of Lahr for some places around Wetzlar with the Duchy of Nassau.

With boundary adjustments in the Duchy of Nassau, the Amt of Ellar was merged with the Amt of Hadamar. After the Duchy's annexation in 1866, the places within the Amt found themselves in the Kingdom of Prussia. In 1886, under the Prussian district and province reorganization, the old Nassau Amt system was abolished. Waldbrunn's constituent communities then belonged to the district of Limburg, whereas Waldernbach was assigned to the Oberlahnkreis district.

British bombers dropped seven high-explosive bombs over Ellar during the Second World War on 29 August 1941. On 27 March 1945, United States troops occupied the community. Since 1947, the community has been part of the Land of Hesse.

In 1964, the municipal coat of arms was introduced as Ellar's arms. On 1 January 1971 came the merger of the communities of Ellar and Hintermeilingen into the community of Ellar. The centres of Fussingen, Hausen and Lahr merged themselves into the community of (Alt-)Waldbrunn. On 1 July 1974, the five centres were united to form the community of Waldbrunn (Westerwald).

=== Religion ===
The population is overwhelmingly Roman Catholic.

== Politics ==
=== Mayor ===
Mayoral elections take place every six years. In the latest elections in March 2020 the incumbent mayor Peter Blum (independent) was re-elected. Previous mayors were:

- Lothar Blättel: 1990-2014
- since 2014: Peter Blum

=== Community council ===
The municipal election held on 26 March 2006 yielded the following results:

Parties and voter communities		% 2006	Seats; 2006	% 2001	Seats; 2001
CDU	Christian Democratic Union of Germany	57.2	18	56.5	17
SPD	Social Democratic Party of Germany	19.2	6	21.4	7
BLW	Bürgerliste Waldbrunn	23.6	7	22.1	7
Total		100.0	31	100.0	31
Voter turnout in %		47.5		59.2	

=== Coat of arms ===
Waldbrunn's arms might heraldically be described thus: Party per pale, Or a lion rampant sinister gules armed and langued azure, azure a lion rampant dexter Or armed and langued gules strewn with billets Or.

It was borne by the community of Ellar from 1964 onwards, and under a resolution in 1977 was adopted as the greater community's arms. The arms show on the sinister side (left from the armsbearer's point of view; right from the viewer's) the lion of the House of Nassau (gold on blue), and on the dexter side (right from the armsbearer's point of view; left from the viewer's) the lion of the County of Katzenelnbogen (red on gold). The charges symbolize the old Amt's historical allegiances to Nassau and Katzenelnbogen.

=== Town partnerships ===
The community of Waldbrunn has no partner communities. However, the centre of Ellar maintains one with Oststeinbek near Hamburg.

== Sightseeing ==
Waldbrunn has certain significant sightseeing destinations:

- Ellar
  - Ellar Castle
  - the old smithy (part of the Heimatmuseum)
  - Ludwig-Bös-Haus (Heimatmuseum)
  - St. Maximinus's Catholic church (built 1843)
  - town wall ruins with the Hungerturm, or "Hunger Tower" (14th century)
  - former Jewish graveyard
- Hausen:
  - St. Laurentius Catholic church
- Fussingen
  - St. Leonhard Catholic church
- Lahr
  - Romanesque basilica Johannes Enthauptung, or "John's Beheading" (13th century)
  - new octagonal Johannes Enthauptung church
  - historic graveyard
  - historic parish house (16th century)
  - bakehouse in the old town hall
- Hintermeilingen:
  - Maria Verkündigung (Annunciation) Catholic church
Things to see in Waldbrunn

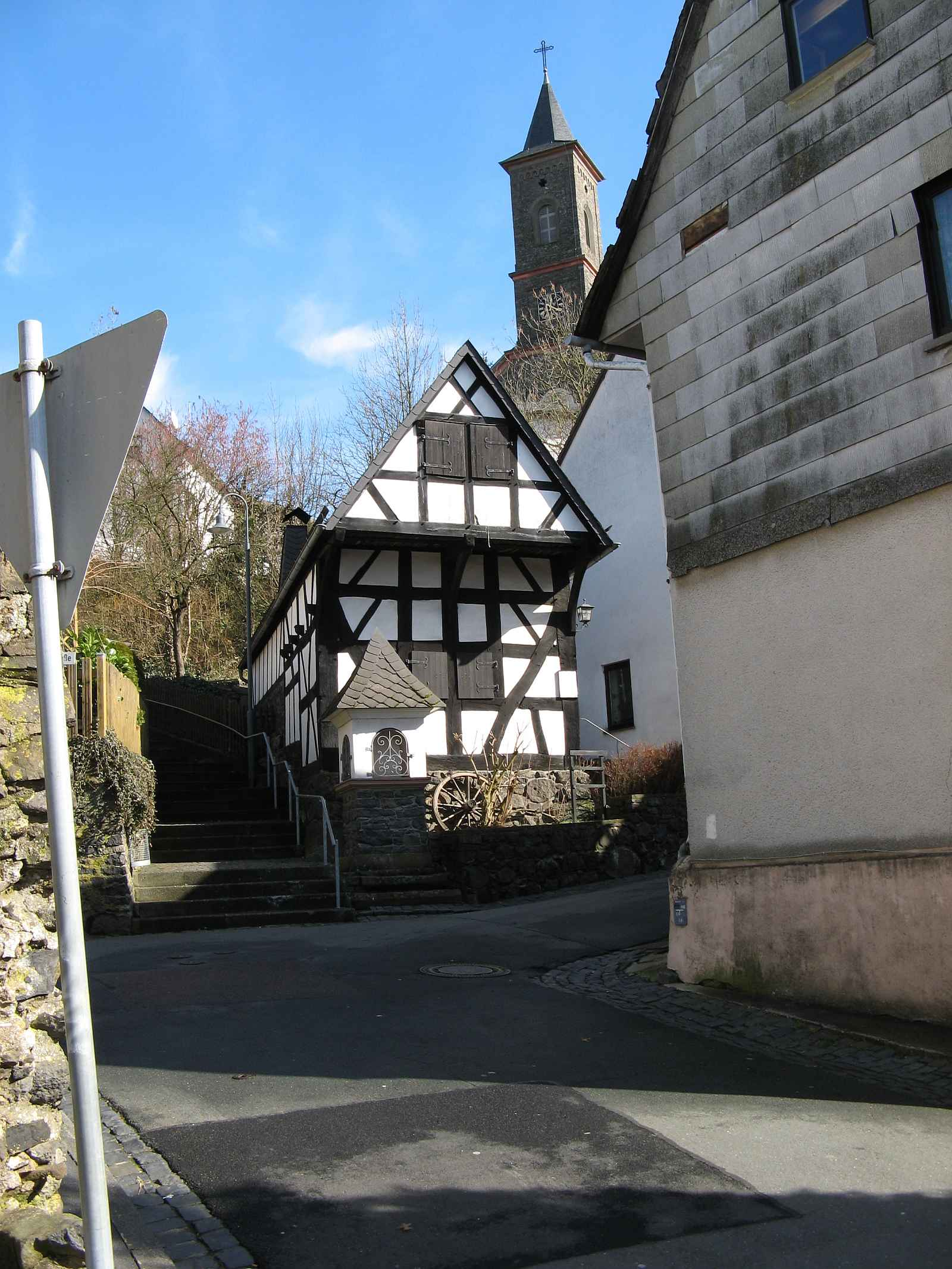
Old smithy in Ellar

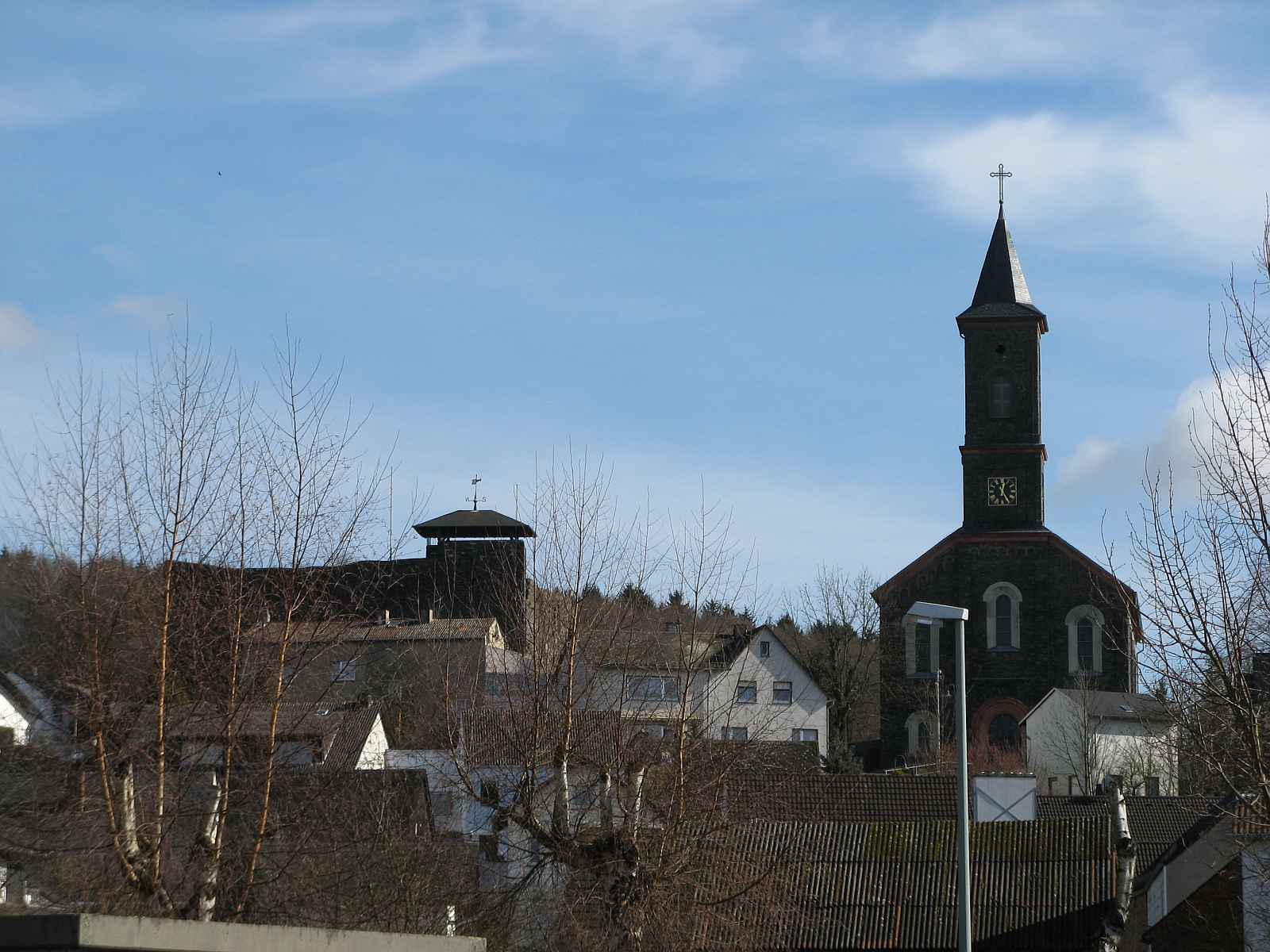
Ellar: castle and church

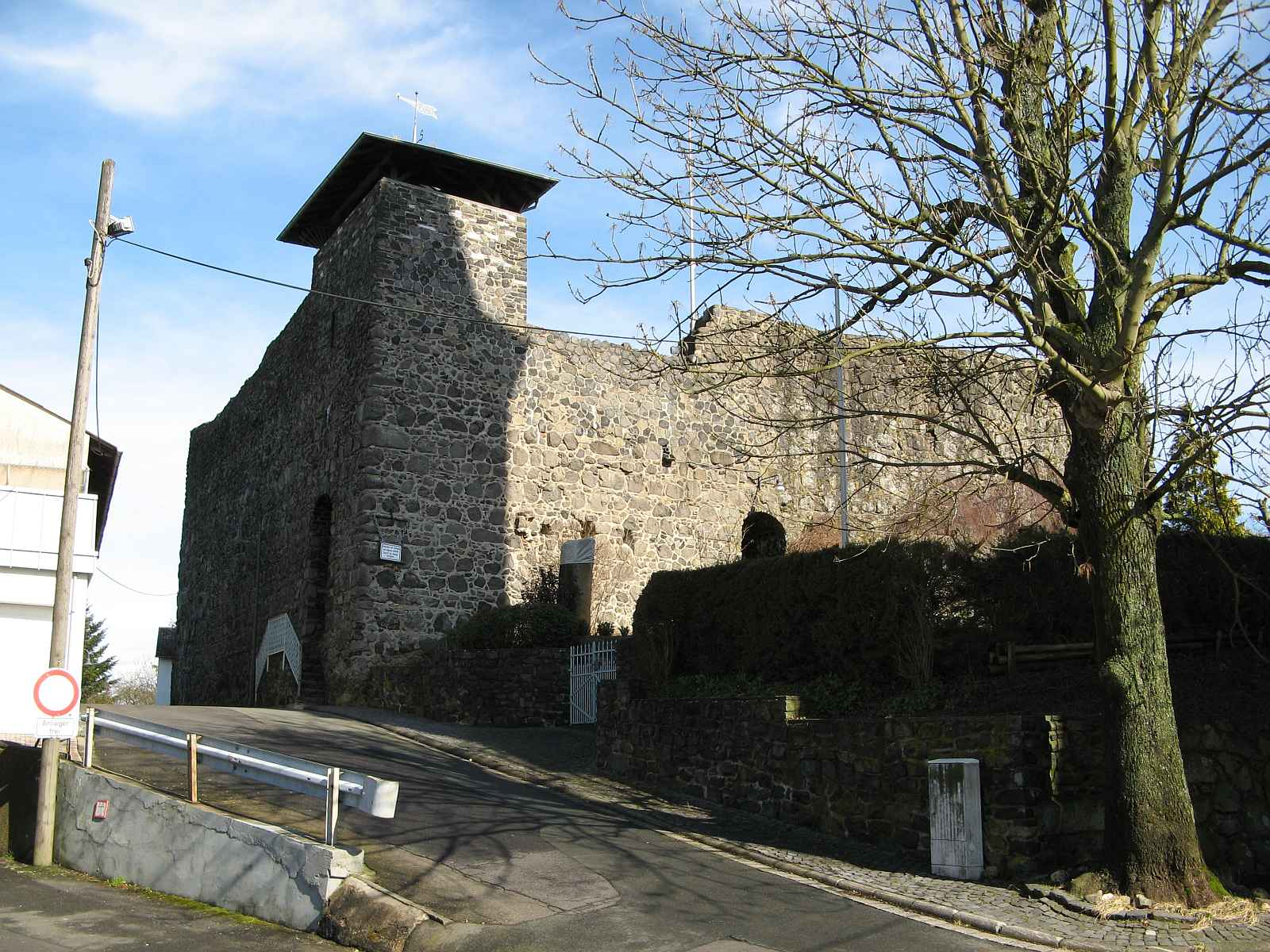
Ellar Castle

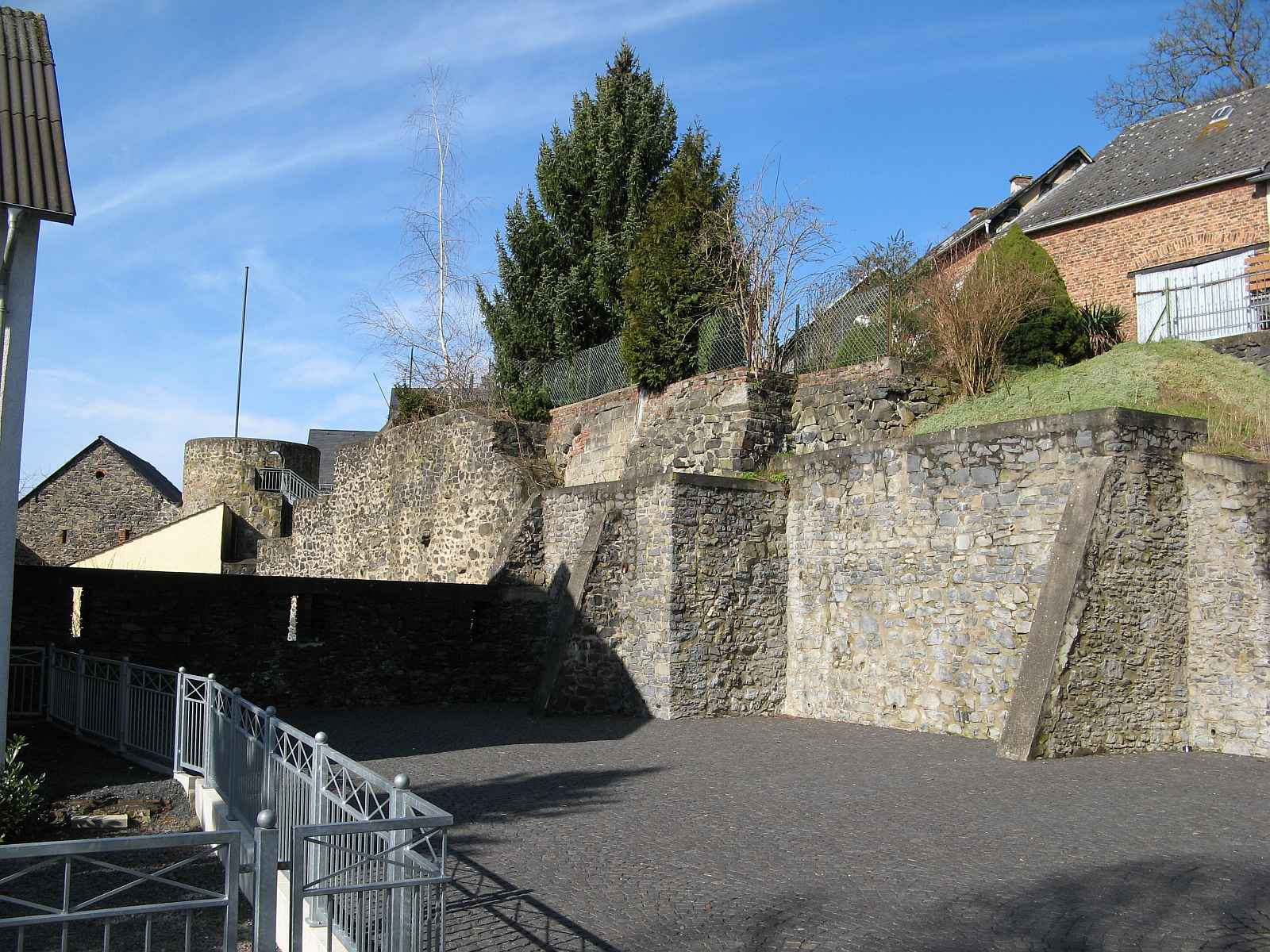
Ellar town wall ruins

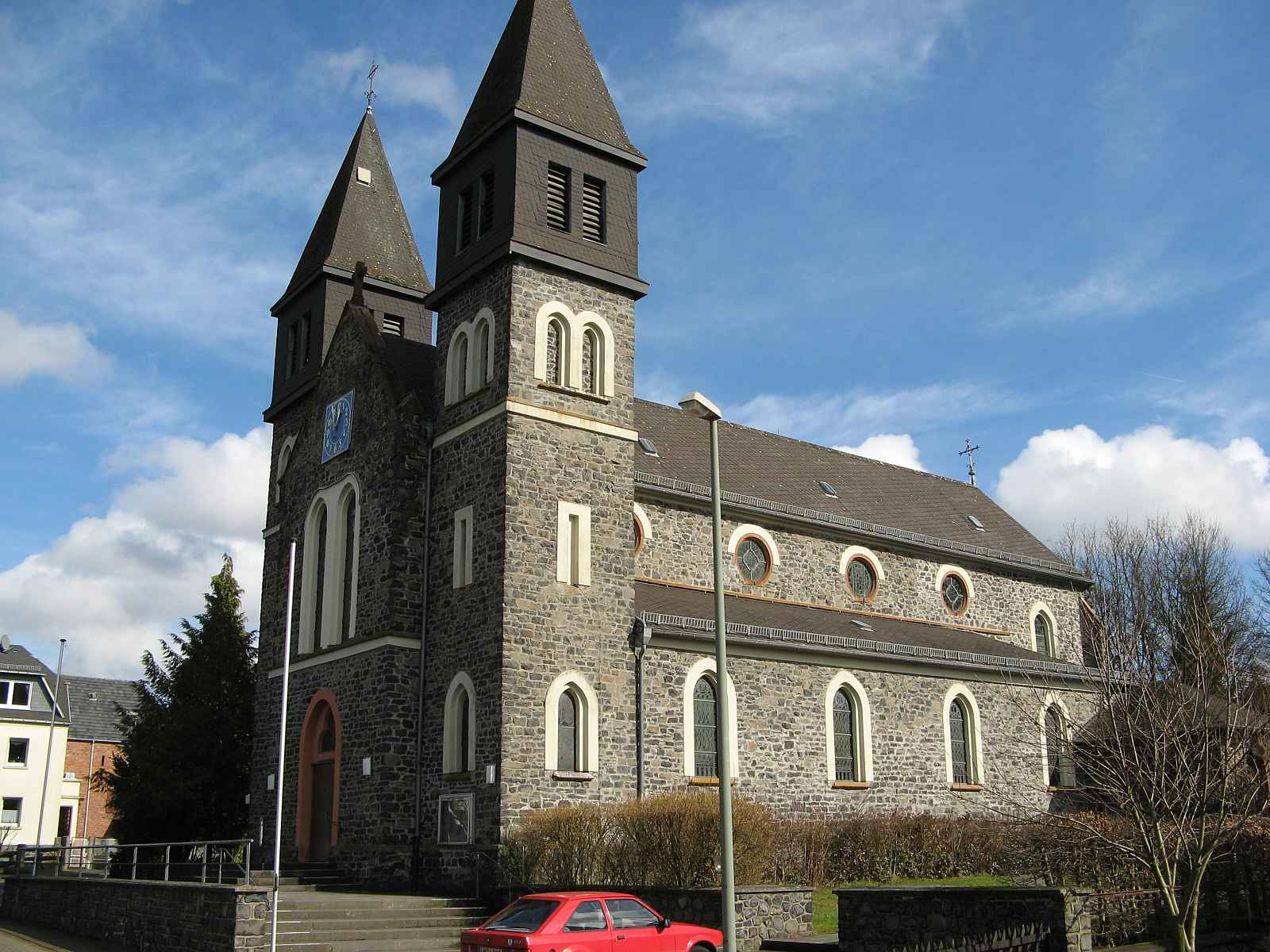
Hausen Catholic church

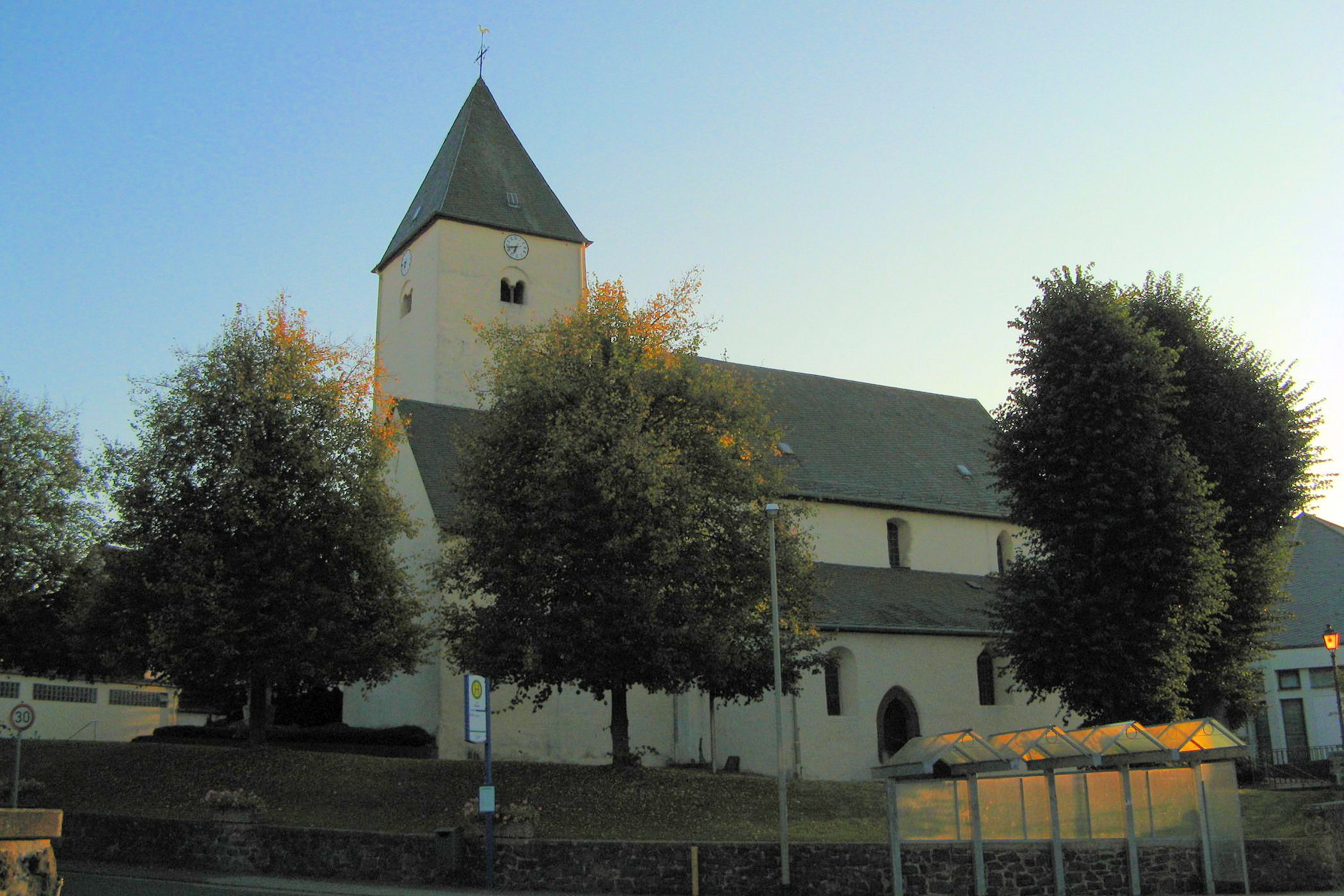
Romanesque basilica in Lahr

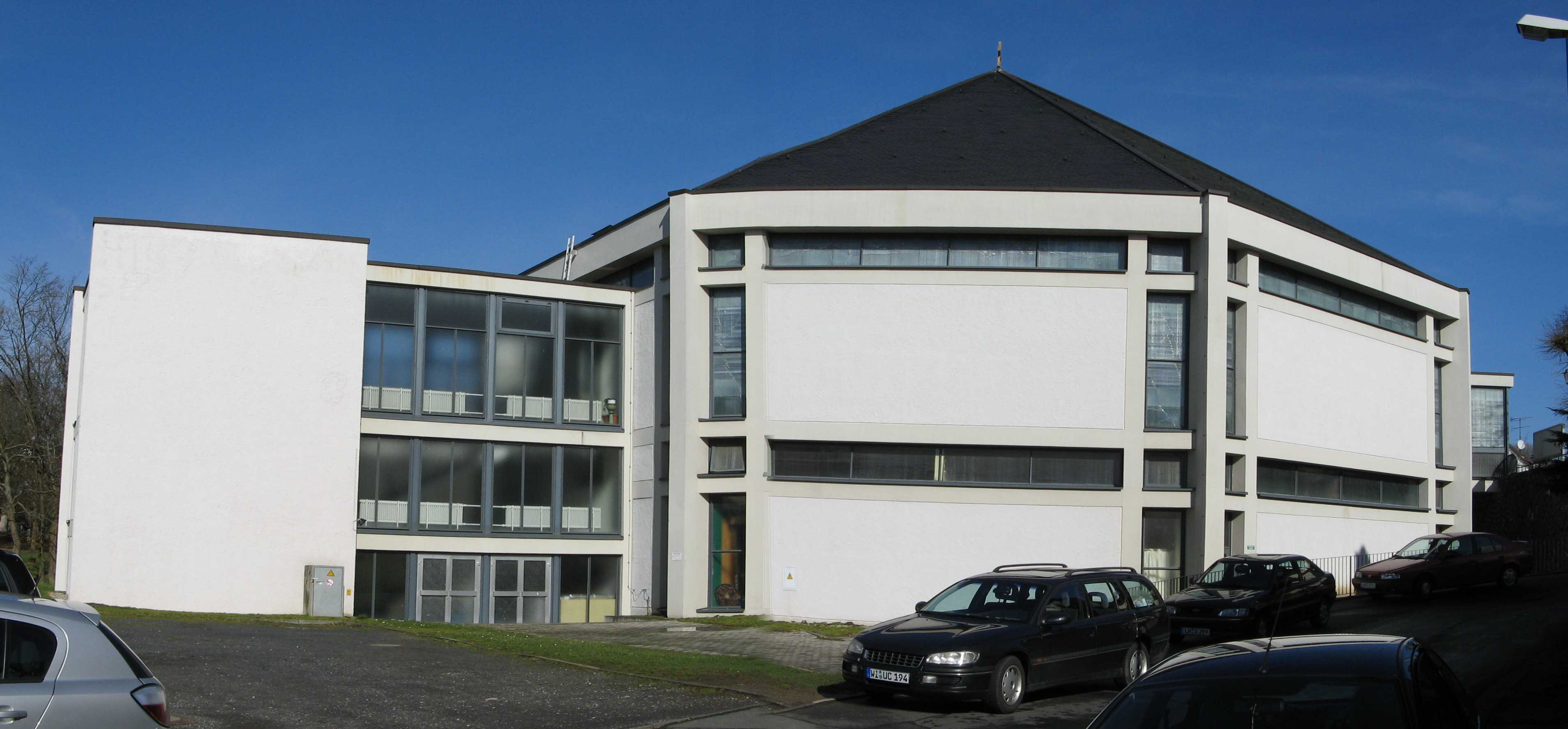
New church in Lahr

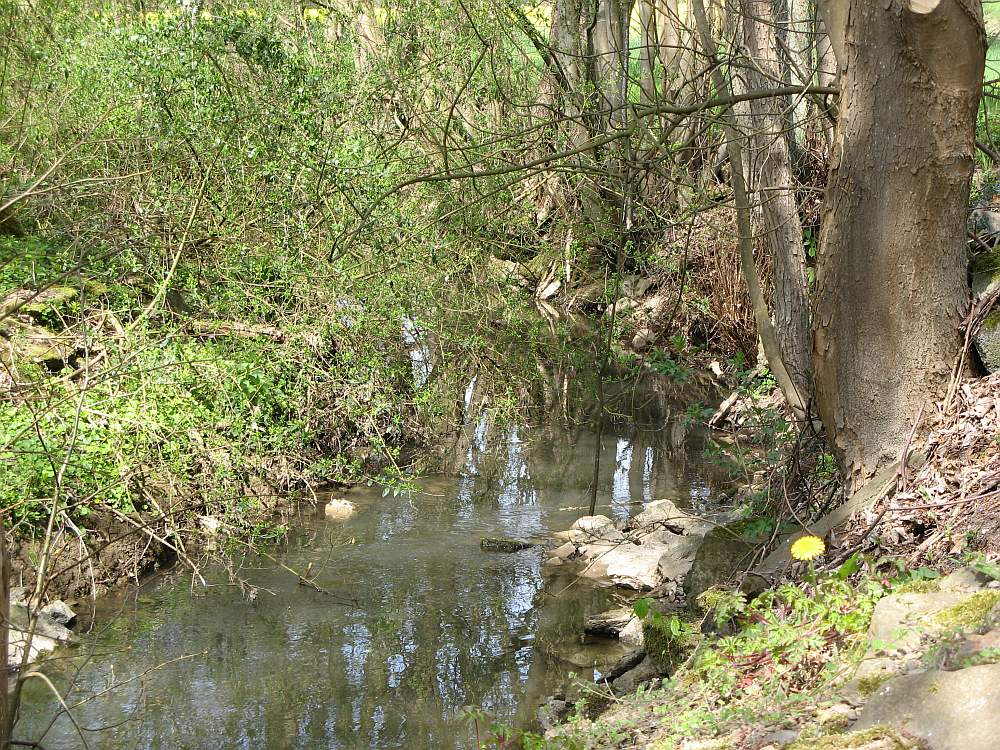
Kerkerbach near the Schlagmühle

=== Museums ===
Ellar has a Heimatmuseum ("homeland museum"). It houses the collection in the Ludwig-Bös-Haus: the still functional old smithy as well as remains of the town wall. In Hintermeilingen on 16 July 2006, the Hintermeilinger Geschichts- und Museumsverein ("History and Museum Club") was founded. It has set itself the goal of turning the old town hall in Hintermeilingen into a "homeland museum".

=== Music ===
One of the oldest Westerwald singing clubs has been in Lahr since 1839. In the other centres are more singing clubs. Furthermore, the Musikverein Fussingen has the Original Waldbrunner Blaskapelle (wind orchestra). There is another wind orchestra in Ellar run by the fire brigade; in 2007, it had its 75-year jubilee.

== Economy and infrastructure ==
=== Transport ===
Waldbrunn is not directly linked to the long-distance road network. The nearest Bundesstraße interchanges are on Bundesstraße 49 in the communities of Merenberg and Beselich. The nearest interchanges on Bundesstraße 54 are in the community of Elbtal.

Since the Kerkerbachbahn (railway) stopped running in 1958, there has been no more rail service. The nearest long-distance railway station is to be found in Limburg. There, besides regional lines to Koblenz, Gießen, Frankfurt am Main and Au, can be found an InterCityExpress station on the Cologne-Frankfurt high-speed rail line. It is about 80 km from Waldbrunn to Frankfurt Airport.

=== Education ===
There are primary schools in the centres of Ellar, Hausen, Lahr and Hintermeilingen. Children from Fussingen go to the one in Hausen.

All Waldbrunn's centres but Ellar belong to the feeder area for the Westerwaldschule Haupt- and Realschule. Ellar belongs to the feeder area for the St. Blasius Mittelpunktschule (roughly "comprehensive school") in Frickhofen.

The nearest Gymnasium is in Hadamar, and other higher schools can be found in Limburg an der Lahn.

== Famous people ==
=== Honorary citizens ===
Walter Rudersdorf (1926-2015), teacher and local historian

=== Sons and daughters of the town ===
Paul Grimm (* 1926), sculptor and painter

=== Other famous people connected with the community ===
- Anton Hoen (b. about 1540/41; d. 7 August 1587) was a Landschreiber (roughly "state secretary" – a high position), commander and Amtsverweser (Amt administrator) of the County of Diez. He is known to have been an Amt secretary by 1567.
- Rutger Hesselman, Jesuit priest S.J., d. 30 April 1637 (see above). A street in Lahr is named after him. He was buried in the Pfarrkirche Liebfrauen in Hadamar.
- Emil Bartoschek, b. 30 July 1899 in Czuchów, Upper Silesia; d. 26 February 1969 in Waldbrunn-Fussingen, was a German painter, student of Johannes Itten at the Weimar Bauhaus and master student of Karl Mueller and Oskar Moll at the Staatliche Akademie für Kunst und Kunstgewerbe in Breslau (now Wrocław).
