= Emil Bartoschek =

German painter

Emil Bartoschek (30 July 1899 – 26 February 1969) was a German painter and Bauhaus-artist.

== Life ==
Bartoschek was born in Czuchow, which became part of Poland in 1922. He began to learn and work in 1914 as a decorative painter in Czerwionka, where he also received drawing and painting lessons from the academic painter Gotschlich. His initial works were shown in a collective exhibition in Hindenburg in 1919.

=== At the Bauhaus and in Breslau ===
In 1920 he began his studies with the preliminary course of Johannes Itten at the Bauhaus in Weimar. He was also taught by Paul Klee and Wassily Kandinsky during his studies. Due to the turbulent political situation in the border area of Poland and German Silesia, he left Weimar, and in 1921 went to study at the State Academy of Fine and Applied Arts in Breslau (today: Wroclaw). He was a master student of Otto Mueller and Oskar Moll. He was a member of the artist group Die Brücke (The Bridge). From 1925 Bartoschek worked as an artist in Breslau and had solo exhibitions and participated also in collective exhibitions. He shared a studio with Alexander Camaro. In 1930 he married Elsa Bartoschek and moved in 1937 permanently to Berlin.

=== Berlin ===
His studio in Berlin was near the Tiergarten. For commercial and political reasons he made popular impressionist and naturalist paintings of the landscape of Brandenburg, which were sold through the galleries of Sarcander and Kallide, at the Friedrichstrasse, in large quantities. As he was afraid to be arrested by the Nazis producing "degenerate art", his real artistic work was presented in a very small circle, and only a few of these modernist paintings and drawings were sold. In 1939 he bought a small lot in the countryside near Schorfheide and built a weekend home to work more undisturbed. In 1942 his Berlin studio and much of his work was destroyed by bombs, and he moved temporarily to Schorfheide. In 1945 he escaped from the Russians, with only a few personal items, to the western part of Germany. Works by Bartoschek, hidden in a bunker in Berlin, were destroyed in the battle of Berlin.

=== Western Germany after 1945 ===
Emil Bartoschek became part of the artist association Hagenring in Hagen. In 1949 he separated from his first wife, and he married his former student Hildegard Grunert, who taught ceramics and decorative painting in Cologne. Bartoschek's later work turned back to the modern painting and produced a large quantity of impressionistic, abstract, expressionist and surrealist oil paintings, drawings, watercolors, tempera paintings, charcoal, chalk and graphite drawings. In 1969, Emil Bartoschek died shortly before his 70th birthday, in Waldbrunn.

== Works ==
With his pictures which he painted to conceal his abstract work in large numbers, plus the destruction of his main works and his extensive and wide-ranging later works, today give a distorted picture of the work of the Bauhaus artist Bartoschek.

Works of his can be found in the Museum Haus Schlesien (Deutsches Kultur- and Bildungszentrum e. V., in Heisterbacherrott, Museum of the City of Lennestadt) as well as in private collections. The Haus Schlesien in 1986 displayed an exhibition with works of Bartoschek.

== See also ==
- List of German painters
