= Portrait of Greta Moll =

1908 painting by Henri Matisse

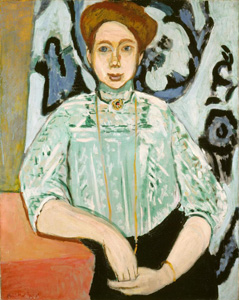
- Artist: Henri Matisse
- Year: 1908
- Medium: oil paint, canvas
- Dimensions: 93 cm (37 in) × 73.5 cm (28.9 in)
- Location: National Gallery
- Owner: Marg Moll, Fine Arts Associates, Sarah Campbell Blaffer, Lefevre Gallery, National Gallery
- Accession: 4192

Portrait of Greta Moll is a painting by Henri Matisse from 1908. It is part of the National Gallery collection in London.

Margarete Moll known as Greta was a German artist and a student of Matisse.

In the early 21st century the ownership of the painting was disputed. Purchased by the National Gallery in 1979, the decedents of Oskar and Greta claimed the portrait, originally in the collection of Oskar Moll, was secreted in Switzerland after World War II to keep it safe from looters. The family stated in a lawsuit filed in 2015, that the painting was stolen in 1947, and under international agreement of war-related lost property the painting should be returned to the family. In 2014 the Spoliation Advisory Panel declined to hear the case as the painting was not stolen on or before 1945. The family then tried to file suit in New York. The court refused to hear the case claiming that court did not have jurisdiction. In 2018 the federal appeals court in New York declined to hear the case. In 2019 the U.S. Supreme Court declined to hear an appeal of the case.

The National Gallery, London has legal ownership and maintains possession.

== See also ==
- List of works by Henri Matisse
