= Marg Moll =

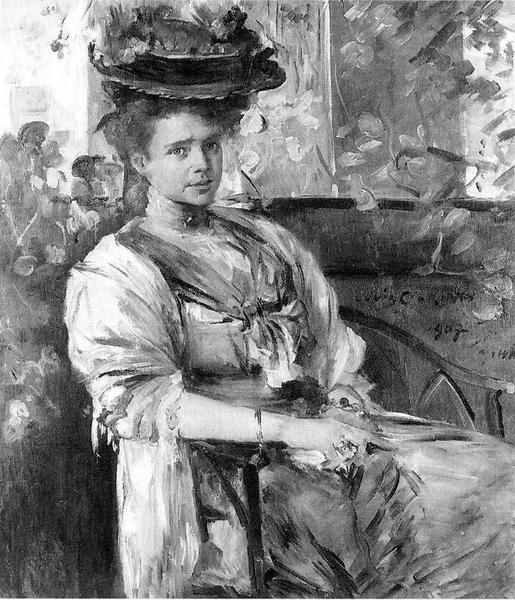
- Portrait of Margarethe Moll (1907) by Lovis Corinth
- Born: Margarethe Haeffner; August 2, 1884; Mühlhausen, Germany
- Died: March 15, 1977 (aged 92); Munich, Germany
- Known for: Sculpture
- Spouse: Oskar Moll
- Website: www.margmoll.de/en/index.html

Marg Moll (born Margarethe Haeffner; 2 August 1884 – 15 March 1977) was a German sculptor, painter and author.

Moll was strongly influenced by Henri Matisse as a young artist and spent her life contributing to his form of art, although at times her art was destroyed and criticized by Nazis because it was modern art. Moll was known for being very high spirited when it came to Matisse and was known for building an "ultra-modern house" in Berlin designed by Hans Scharoun, German architect best known for his design on the Berlin Philharmonic concert hall in Berlin, Germany.

== Biography ==
Moll was born in Mühlhausen. She attended the Stadelsches Institut in Frankfurt am Main from 1903 to 1905 and studied under painter Hans Volker in Wiesbaden. She also studied painting in Bavaria under Oskar Moll, a professor and director at the Breslau Academy. Marg also studied sculpture under Louise Schmidt in Frankfurt am Main. In 1905, she traveled to Rome and later studied at Lovis Corinth's school for women in Berlin from 1906 to 1907.

Margarethe married Oskar Moll and became known as the "Director's Wife" due to her husband's position. From 1907 to 1908, she studied at Académie Matisse, Paris, and founded the Matisse School in Paris with her husband in 1908 to teach and promote the modernist aesthetics in art, including Matisse's form of art. In 1908, the Molls met Henri Matisse. In the same year, Matisse painted her portrait, now in the National Gallery in London. When she began to work with Matisse, she concentrated more heavily on sculpture, perfecting her technique and using all sorts of sculpting materials.

The Molls had two daughters: Melita, born in 1908, and Brigitte, born in 1918. She lived in several cities throughout her life, including Berlin, from 1908 to 1919, and Breslau, where she moved to in 1919 and remained until 1932. In 1934, she returned to Berlin and lived there throughout World War II. Though her family hid from the Nazis during the war, the Molls built a house in Berlin in 1943 designed by the German architect Hans Scharoun. They filled their home with paintings by Matisse, Fernand Léger, Georges Braque, and Picasso. Their home, along with many of her works, was destroyed by the bombing of Berlin in 1943. She traveled to Europe and the United States after Oskar died in 1947. She lived in both Düsseldorf and Munich after 1952.

== Art ==
Moll painted and sculpted her entire life, but her sculpting style over time changed from Matisse-like figurative arts to a much more modern form of art like Constantin Brâncuși’s works. Her works incorporated various styles of German art, including Expressionism and Bauhaus style. She experienced these forms of art as the wife of Oskar Moll, who was the director of Breslau Academy. Moll once took an Eheferien, German for a vacation from marriage and went to Paris to finish some of her works in 1928, as stated in her autobiographical notes. Moll wanted to separate her works from her husband's, but at times they did exhibit their works together. Her earliest exhibitions of art were with other artists like the Novembergruppe in Berlin and with Oskar Schlemmer, a Breslau artist at the Galerie Flechtheim in 1931. Her works were bought by museums throughput Germany, but many of them were later removed and destroyed by the Nazis. One of her sculptures, The Dancer was found in ruins during excavation for a new train station in Berlin, along with ten other works. Her work was a victim of Hitler's campaign against so-called degenerate art. Moll's sculpture is featured at Berlin's Neues Museum in Germany.

== Recognition and legacy ==
After her husband's death in 1947, Moll exhibited her work several times. She traveled to the United States where she was recognized as an artist who had promoted the importance of modern art in Germany and throughout the world. In 1950 she met the sculptor Henry Moore. In 1951, she became a member of the Women's International Art Club in London and received a medal. She continued to work with GEDOK, an organization that helped female artists exhibit their work freely from 1930 to 1970. She was awarded a Groupe 1940 medal in Paris. When she was 70, she gave lectures at Wayne State University in Detroit. By the 1950s her works were being exhibited along with her husband's paintings. She died in Munich in 1977.
