= Willy Jaeckel =

German painter and lithographer (1888–1944)

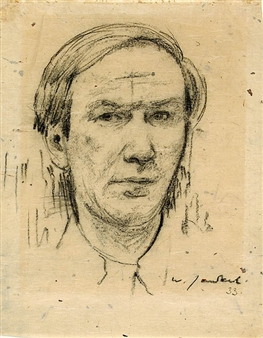
- Self-portrait (1933)
- Born: Willy Gustav Erich Jaeckel; 10 February 1888; Breslau, German Empire
- Died: 30 January 1944 (aged 55); Berlin, Nazi Germany
- Education: Staatliche Akademie für Kunst und Kunstgewerbe Breslau, 1908; Dresden Academy of Fine Arts
- Movement: Expressionism

Willy Gustav Erich Jaeckel (10 February 1888 – 30 January 1944) was a German painter, lithographer and representative of the Expressionist art movement.

== Biography ==
Jaeckel was born on 10 February 1888 in Breslau, German Empire (present-day Wrocław, Poland). His father was a public lands manager and he originally intended to become a forest ranger, but poor health forced him to change his plans. From 1906 to 1908, he studied at the Staatliche Akademie für Kunst und Kunstgewerbe Breslau, then enrolled at the Dresden Academy of Fine Arts, under the direction of Otto Gussmann, an ornamental painter. In 1913, he moved to Berlin to work as a free-lance artist and became a member of the Berlin Secession in 1915. Four years later, he was elected a member of the Prussian Academy of Arts and became a teacher at the University of the Arts in 1925.

His first successful painting was "Kampf" (Battle, or Struggle), a large canvas featuring a bellowing, muscular, naked man. In 1928, he was awarded the "Georg-Schlicht-Preis" for the "most beautiful portrait of a German woman". His work was part of the art competitions at the 1928 Summer Olympics and the 1932 Summer Olympics.

He was named an associate professor in 1933, but he was dismissed when the Nazis came to power. His students protested, and he was eventually reinstated. This victory was short-lived, however. Those who took classes with him were likely not to graduate and, in 1937, some of his works were officially classified as "degenerate". In response, he painted "Plowman in the Evening" (1939), meant to depict the Nazi concept of Blood and Soil. Many of his works survived the war only because the Nazi government removed them from Berlin.

He lost his studio to a bombing raid in 1943 and he was killed during another raid early the following year. One of his major works, a four-part fresco mural at the Bahlsen bakery in Hanover dating from 1917, was destroyed later in 1944.

== Selected paintings ==
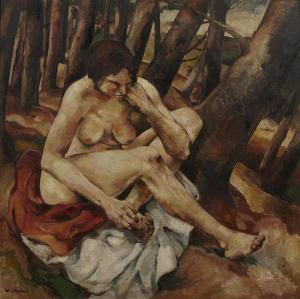
Sitting Female Nude

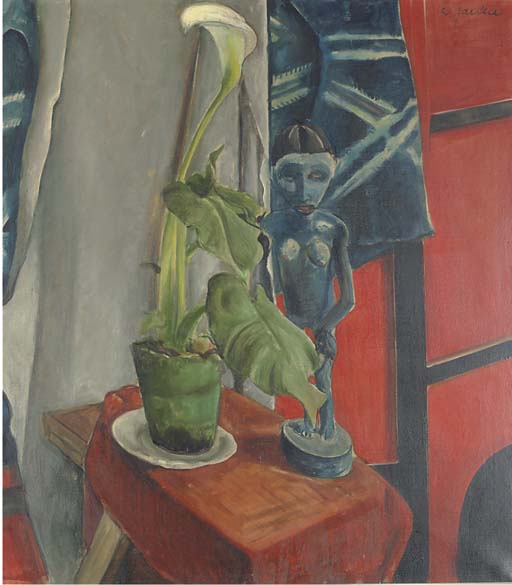
Calla Lily with African Sculpture

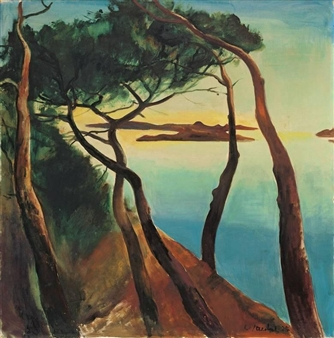
Landscape by the Sea

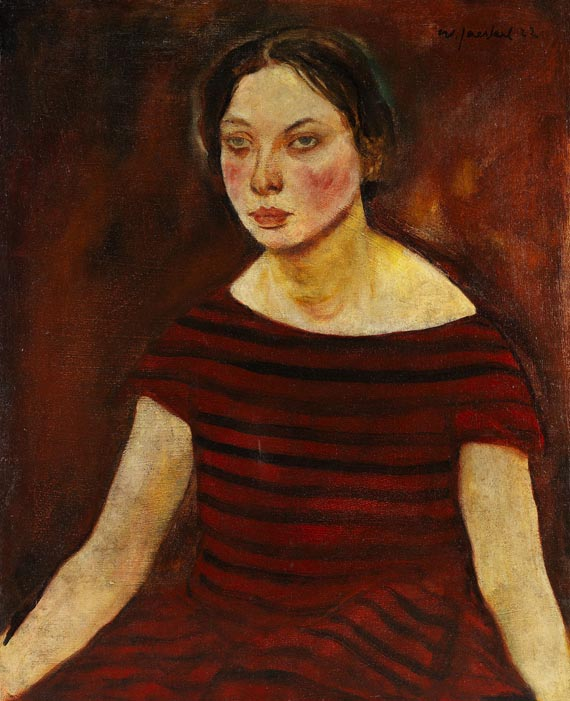
Portrait of a Woman
