= Walther Kohlhase =

German painter

- Born: 6 March 1908; Raguhn, Germany
- Died: 14 April 1993 (aged 85); Raisdorf, Germany
- Occupation: Painter

Walther Kohlhase (6 March 1908 – 14 April 1993) was a German painter. His work was part of the painting event in the art competition at the 1932 Summer Olympics. He also studied at the Staatliche Akademie für Kunst und Kunstgewerbe Breslau.
