= Fritz Erler =

German painter

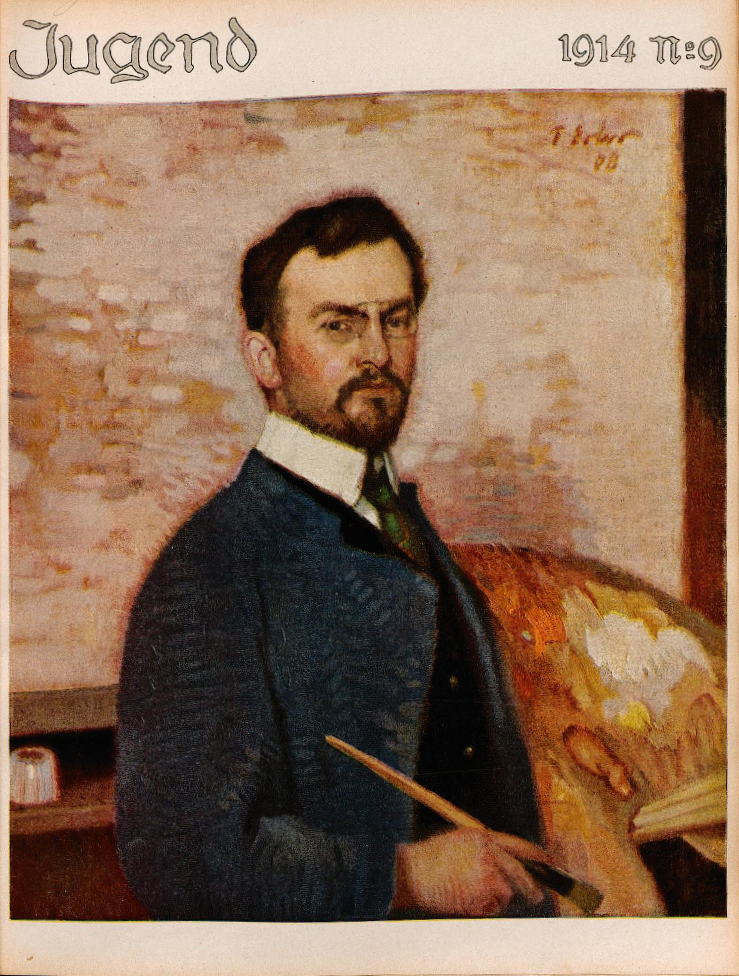
Fritz Erler self-portrait (1908)

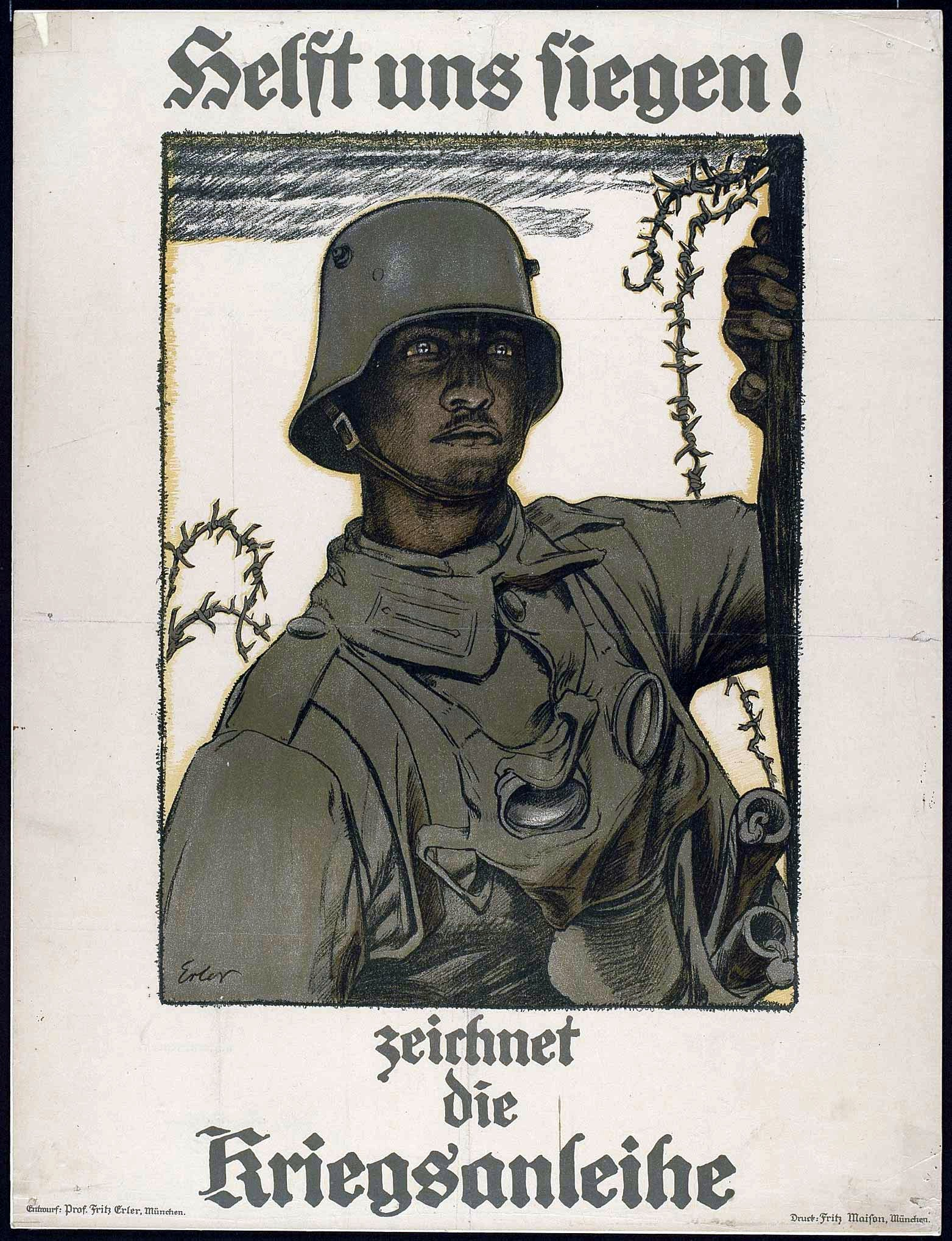
Helft uns siegen – zeichnet die Kriegsanleihe! (Help us win – buy war bonds!) 1917. Collection the Imperial War Museum

conquered village, 1916

Fritz Erler (15 December 1868 – 11 December 1940) was a German painter, graphic designer and scenic designer. Although most talented as an interior designer, he is perhaps best remembered for several propaganda posters he produced during World War I.

== Education and early career ==
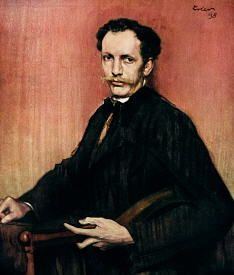
1898 Portrait of Richard Strauss by Fritz Erler.

He was born in Frankenstein (Schlesien). Beginning in 1886 he studied under Albrecht Bräuer at the Staatliche Akademie für Kunst und Kunstgewerbe Breslau. He also attended the Académie Julian in Paris. In 1895 he moved to Munich and lived from 1918 in Holzhausen am Ammersee. His first designs date from 1893: vases, glass windows, book covers, later furniture, theatrical sets, and interior decorations. In 1896 he was a founding member of the magazine Jugend. He also painted several portraits around the start of the 20th century, most notably of Richard Strauss and Gerhart Hauptmann.

== World War I and afterward ==
Along with Arthur Kampf Erler was one of the official military painters for the Oberste Heeresleitung. His paintings were commissioned as war propaganda.

The promotional poster for the sixth war bond (sechste Kriegsanleihe) was adorned with his painting Helft uns siegen! (1917), perhaps Erler's best-known work. It brought in at least 13.1 million marks more than any other campaign. Its power of moral exhortation has been compared to James Montgomery Flagg's iconic poster of Uncle Sam, while the idea ultimately derives from the influential Lord Kitchener Wants You poster of 1914. A soldier, his face darkened from the muck of the trenches, gazes beyond the viewer into No Man's Land with eyes that shine as if from an inward light. This heroic image depicts the widespread contemporary belief that trench warfare would somehow be a morally cleansing experience.

During the National Socialist period Erler's portraits of Adolf Hitler, Franz von Epp, and Wilhelm Frick were very remunerative.

Erler died in Munich in 1940.

== See also ==
- List of German painters
