= Eduard Kaempffer =

German painter (1859–1926)

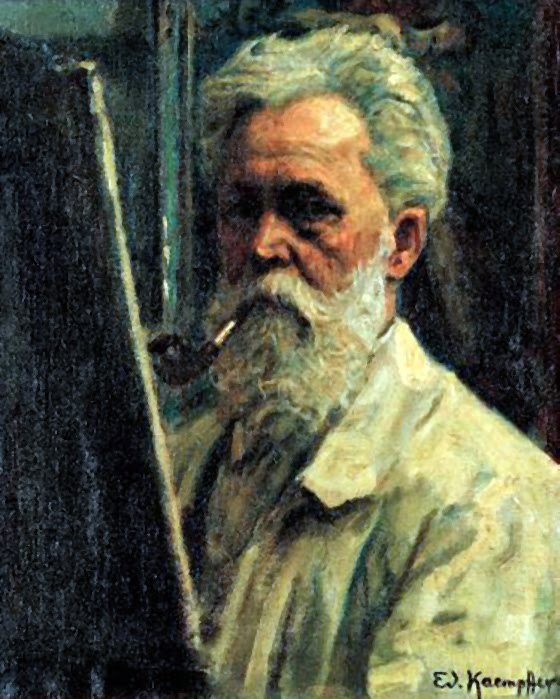
Self-portrait (date unknown)

Eduard Kaempffer (13 May 1859 – 22 March 1926) was a German painter, sculptor and medallist.

== Life and work ==
He was born in Münster. From 1875 to 1880, he studied with Eduard von Gebhardt and Peter Janssen at the Kunstakademie Düsseldorf. Then, from 1880 to 1881, he was enrolled at the Academy of Fine Arts, Munich, where he studied advanced techniques with Ludwig von Löfftz and Anton Seitz. In 1885, he returned to Düsseldorf and lived in one of the homes owned by the widow of Eduard Schoenfeld, a noted landscape painter who had recently died.

That same year, he spent some time in Rome; supported by a stipend from the Abraham Wetter Foundation. Two years later, he was awarded a scholarship from the same foundation for his altarpiece, "The Flagellation of Christ", designed for the Martin-Luther-Kirche in Bad Neuenahr, on behalf of the Kunstverein für die Rheinlande und Westfalen. In 1891, he was back in Munich. In 1893, 1894 und 1895 he was awarded small gold medals at the Große Berliner Kunstausstellung. Following his award in 1895, he was appointed to the Staatliche Akademie für Kunst und Kunstgewerbe Breslau, where he taught "drawing from nature" and figure painting, until 1924. His students there included Oskar Obier, Paul Plontke, Georg Wichmann and Carl Bantzer. He was also involved with the Willingshäuser Artists' Colony. He died in 1926, in Obernigk.

Among his most important works are the cycle of paintings in the stairwell at the Erfurt Town hall, which were executed between 1889 and 1896. They depict scenes from the Tannhäuser legend, the saga of Faust, and the life of Martin Luther; among other subjects. In addition to small bronzes, his sculptures include figures of Salome and Pegasus, as well as a "Lamentation of Christ".

== Selected paintings ==
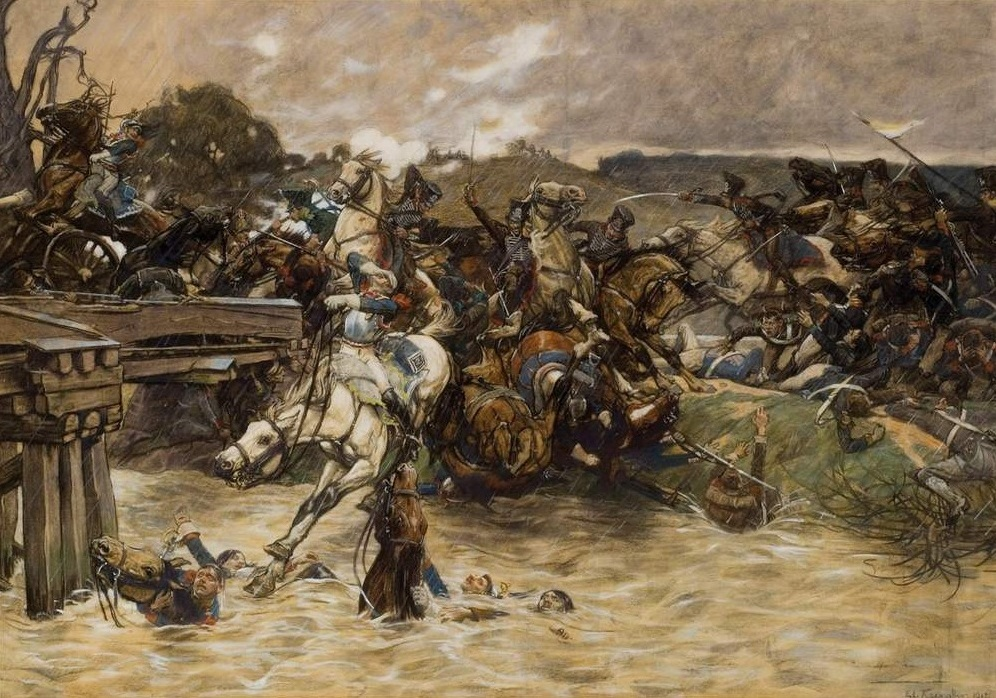
Battle of the Katzbach

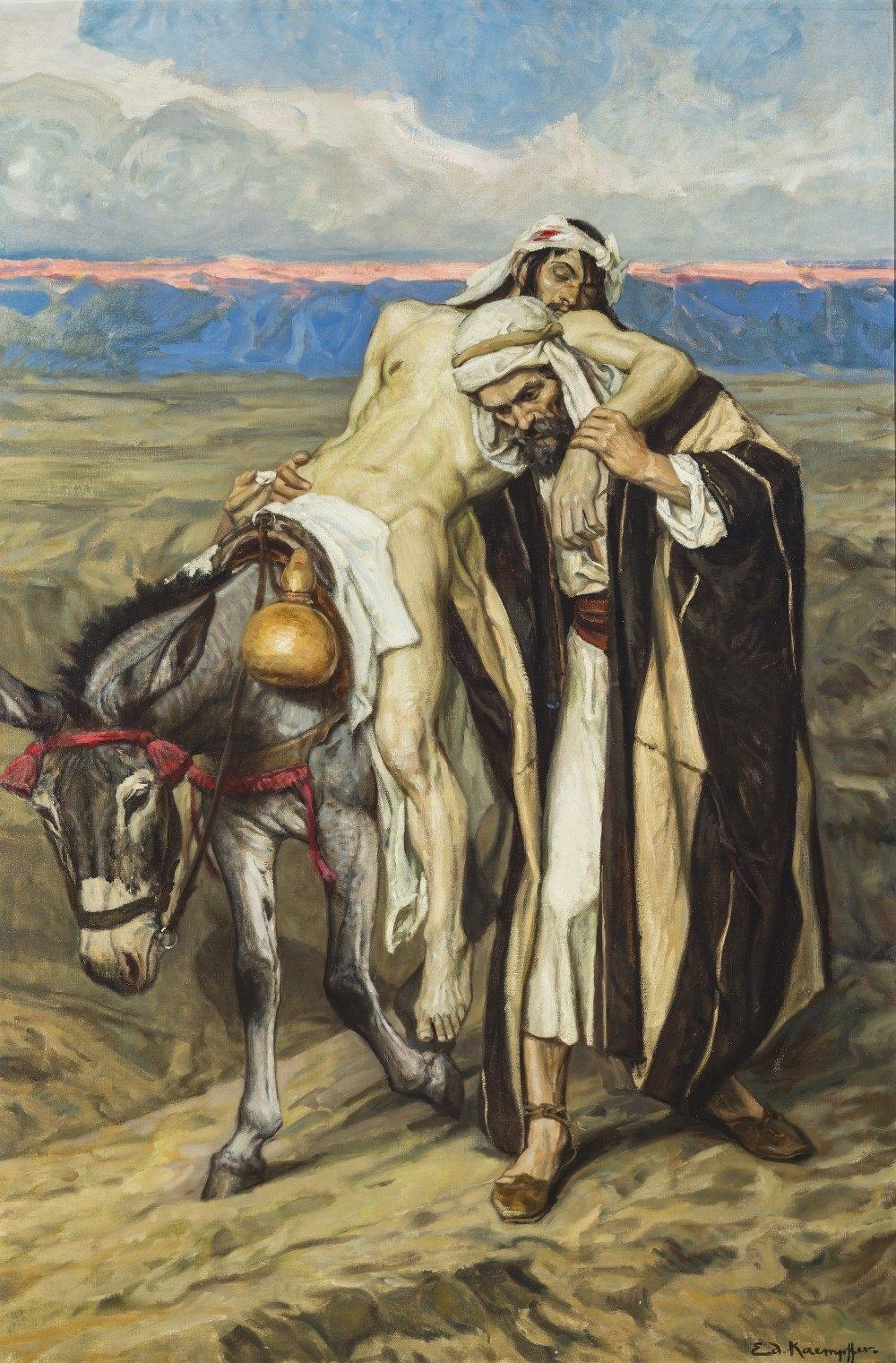
The Good Samaritan

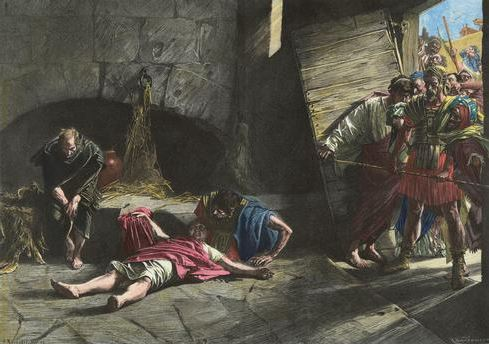
The Death of Nero

== Sources ==
- "Kaempffer, Eduard", In: Allgemeines Lexikon der Bildenden Künstler von der Antike bis zur Gegenwart, Vol. 19: Ingouville–Kauffungen, E. A. Seemann, Leipzig 1926
- "Kaempffer, Eduard". In: Friedrich von Boetticher: Malerwerke des 19. Jahrhunderts. Beitrag zur Kunstgeschichte. Vol.1/2, Heideck–Mayer, Boetticher’s Verlag, Dresden 1895, pg.641 (Online)
- Petra Hölscher: Die Akademie für Kunst und Kunstgewerbe zu Breslau. Wege einer Kunstschule 1791–1932. Ludwig, Kiel 2003, ISBN 3-933598-50-8
