= Horst Strempel =

German painter

- Born: 16 May 1904; Beuthen, Upper Silesia, Germany
- Died: 4 May 1975 (aged 70); Berlin, Germany
- Occupations: Painter (art); Graphic artist
- Political party: KPD; SED

Horst Strempel (16 May 1904 in Beuthen – 4 May 1975 in Berlin) was a German painter and graphic artist.

== Life ==
Strempel's initial training from 1918, after leaving school, was as a house painter. However, from 1923 till 1927 he attended the Regional Academy for Arts and Culture at Breslau (at the time in Germany) where he studied under Oskar Moll and Otto Mueller. In 1927 he moved to Berlin in order to progress his studies with Karl Hofer. It was during this time that he joined the Communist Party, also becoming involved with the closely associated Association of Revolutionary Visual Artists (ARBKD / Assoziation revolutionärer bildender Künstler Deutschlands).

In 1931 or 1932 Strempel's controversial Painting "Blessed are the Poor in Spirit" ("Selig sind die geistig Armen") was removed by exhibition organisers from the annual Berlin Arts exhibition. Then the NSDAP (German Nazi Party) took power, in January 1933, and lost little time in implementing their one-party state strategy. As far as the German Communist Party was concerned this involved expropriating the party assets on 26 May 1933 and embarking on a systematic campaign of arresting or (less frequently) murdering Communist Party members. Strempel was not arrested, but in the middle of 1933 he decided to join the thousands of German communist party members who emigrated to Paris, where he had already lived for two years in 1929-1931 while studying at the École des Beaux-Arts.

Between 1933 and 1939 Strempel lived in Paris, earning a living producing caricatures that were published in the newspapers. At the same time he was working as a decorative artists, on advertisements and as a theatre artist. After the German army took over in Paris in June 1940 Stempel found himself deported to the southern part of France which was still unoccupied, but where the government was in most respects closely aligned with the German forces occupying the north of the country. In the south of France Horst Strempel was accommodated in a succession of internment camps till 1941 when he agreed to an offer that he be deported back to Germany. Although he had received assurances of impunity, on his return he found himself in a Punishment unit. The final two years of the war were spent as a soldier in Yugoslavia and Greece where in 1944 his military career was crowned with a term as a prisoner of war held by the English.

In June 1945 Horst Strempel returned to Berlin and devoted himself to "cultural reconstruction" in the Soviet occupied Eastern part of the city. During the early postwar years he quickly became a well known Berlin figure, both because of his frequent public appearances and because of his mural paintings round the eastern sector of the city, and in particular his mural at the Friedrichstrasse station. He was also producing illustrations for the satirical fortnightly magazine Ulenspiegel.

His painting and graphic art at this time was focused on the contrast between the Nazi period and the subsequent reconstruction phase that was under way. His best known work from 1945/46 is the triptych "Night over Germany" ("Nacht über Deutschland"), which somehow rises above the immediate present, serving as a more general testimony to the phase in history through which the artist was living. The picture sets out the trauma of National Socialism in obscured complex images which the viewer can still identify, but in a way with which the artist could only get to grips if he understood not merely the bare realities but also the underlying spiritual condition of the people.

By 1946 it was becoming increasingly apparent that political division between the Soviet occupation zone and those parts of Germany occupied by the western allies was to be permanent, as a plan unfolded for the creation of a separate stand-alone state, the German Democratic Republic. The East German state was only founded formally in 1949, but the basis for a return to the single party rule was created in April 1946 with the establishment under the Soviet Military Administration of the Socialist Unity Party of Germany (SED / Sozialistische Einheitspartei Deutschlands). Paradoxically this meant an end for the old Communist Party (KDP) in this part of Germany, because in the Soviet zone the creation of the new party resulted from a forced merger - theoretically at this point a merger of equals - between the KPD and the SPD (parties). Horst Strempel, his Communist Party membership no longer illegal in Germany, was among the 1.75 million people who by the end of 1946 had transferred to the new SED (party).

After his epochal "Night over Germany" Strempel produced a large number of still life paintings which also reflect the spirit of the times and place. In 1947 he took a teaching post at the Arts academy in Berlin's Weissensee quarter. A professorship followed in 1949.

The public profile of his art placed Strempel at the heart of the debate then raging over the role of art in a socialist society. The protagonists had become polarized into two camps. There were some who insisted on Soviet-style "Socialist Realism" as the example that East German art should be following, but there were also those who demanded greater artistic independence, and the opportunity to take inspiration from the wide range of modern and traditional artistic approaches manifested round the world. Strempel found himself strongly criticised by people contending that his artistic style could not sufficiently convey the image of humanity being advanced by the country's political leadership. His giant wall painting at the Berlin Friedrichstraße station entitled "Trümmer weg – baut auf" ("Clear the rubble: rebuild") recalled the condition of the city in the years directly following the war, and had never been wholly uncontroversial. In 1951 it was now painted over in a night time cloak-and-dagger operation. In the face of this and other attacks, and in a presumably conscious echo of his flight from Berlin to Paris in 1933, Horst Strempel now felt he had no option but to escape from the German Democratic Republic, and in 1953 he relocated with his family to West Berlin, by now firmly separated politically and beginning to become more segregated physically from the eastern part of the city than hitherto.

In West Berlin Horst Strempel did not enjoy the level of recognition that he had acquired in East Berlin since 1945. After arriving in 1953 it took him till 1971 to obtain formal recognition as a political refugee, thanks in part to the impact on officialdom of the acute political tensions between the two halves of the divided city. In his final decades he left only shallow footprints on the historical record. While he was trying to establish his civic status there was little energy left over for continuing his career as an artist, but he was able to secure his physical survival with jobs that included designing carpets and fabrics. He also gave drawing tuition at community colleges.
