= Oskar Moll =

German painter

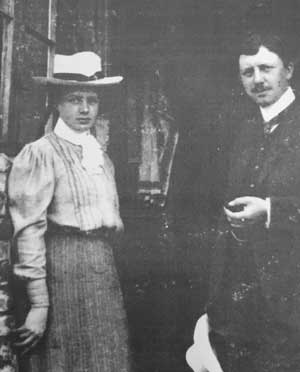
Oskar Moll with his wife, the artist Marg Moll (c. 1906)

Oskar Moll (21 July 1875, Brieg – 19 August 1947, Berlin) was a German Fauvist painter, best known for his landscapes, portraits and somewhat abstract still-lifes.

== Biography ==
Moll initially studied biology in Switzerland, but also taught himself how to paint and decided to pursue art as a career instead. After some time in Munich, he went to Berlin, where he became an assistant in the studios of Lovis Corinth. In 1906, he married the sculptor and painter, Margarethe Haeffner. The following year, they went to Paris, where he made the acquaintance of Henri Matisse and became an habitué of Le Dôme Café. As a result, he, Margarethe and their friend Hans Purrmann participated in founding the short-lived Académie Matisse. During the war, he lived in Berlin and was among the first members of the November Group. He was also a member of the Free Secession.

In 1918, he became a professor at the Staatliche Akademie für Kunst und Kunstgewerbe Breslau. He succeeded August Endell as its Director in 1925 and served until its closure in 1932, following the emergency decrees issued by Heinrich Brüning. He then transferred to the Kunstakademie Düsseldorf, but was there for only a year when he was defamed and dismissed for being a purveyor of "degenerate art". A planned exhibition of his works was closed by the Nazi government in 1935. Two years later, thirty-five of his works were confiscated and displayed at the propagandistic Degenerate Art Exhibition in Munich.

In 1936, he and Margarethe settled into a reclusive life in Berlin, but their home and studio, along with numerous paintings, some by Matisse and Picasso, were destroyed during an air raid in 1943. They attempted to find refuge in his hometown, but were forced to return to Berlin in 1945 when the Red Army occupied that area. He died in Berlin in 1947.

Recently, the Kunstforum Ostdeutsche Galerie has begun a research project devoted to his works.

== Selected paintings ==
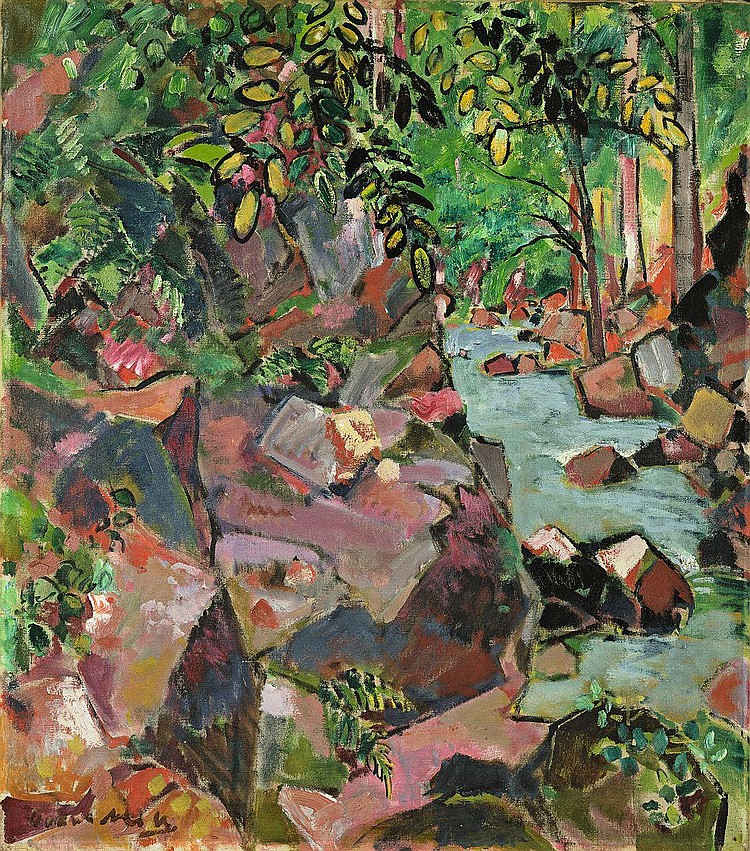
Rocks by a Brook

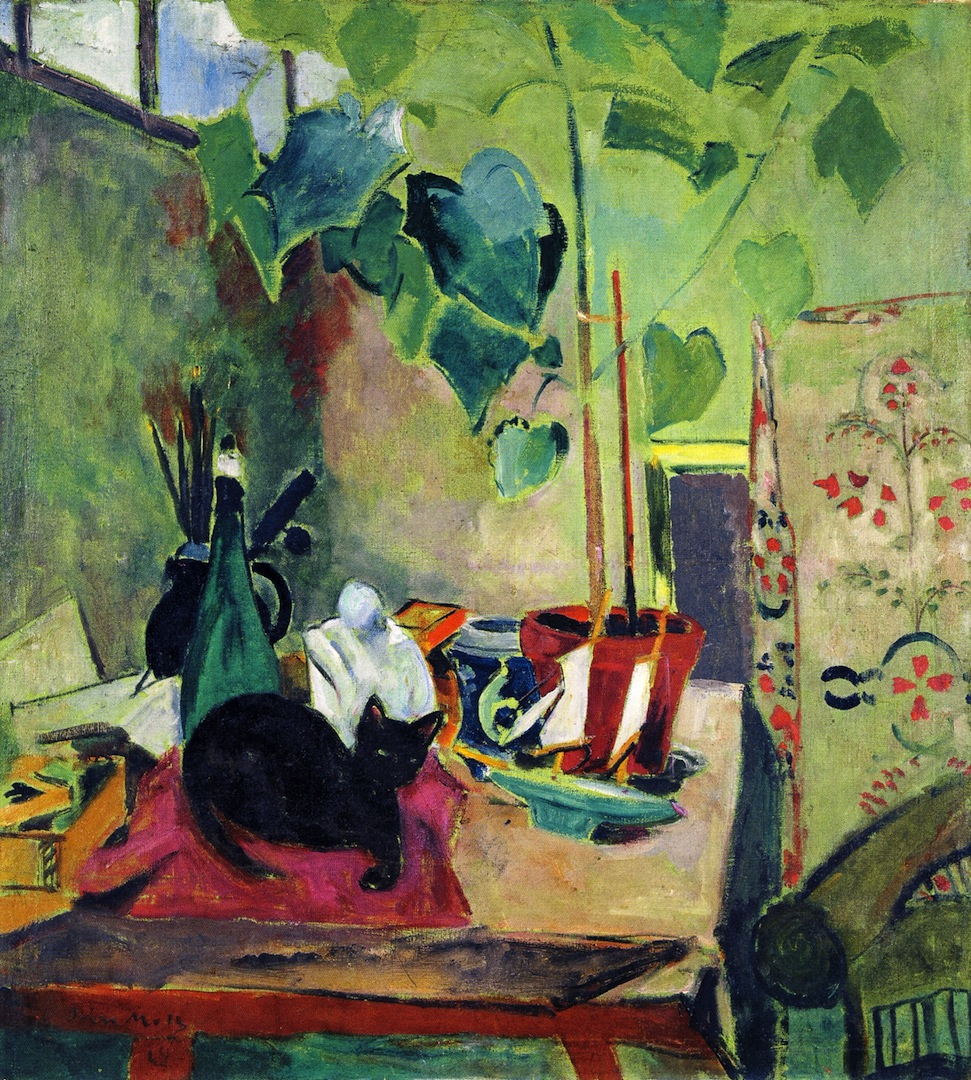
Cat with a House Plant

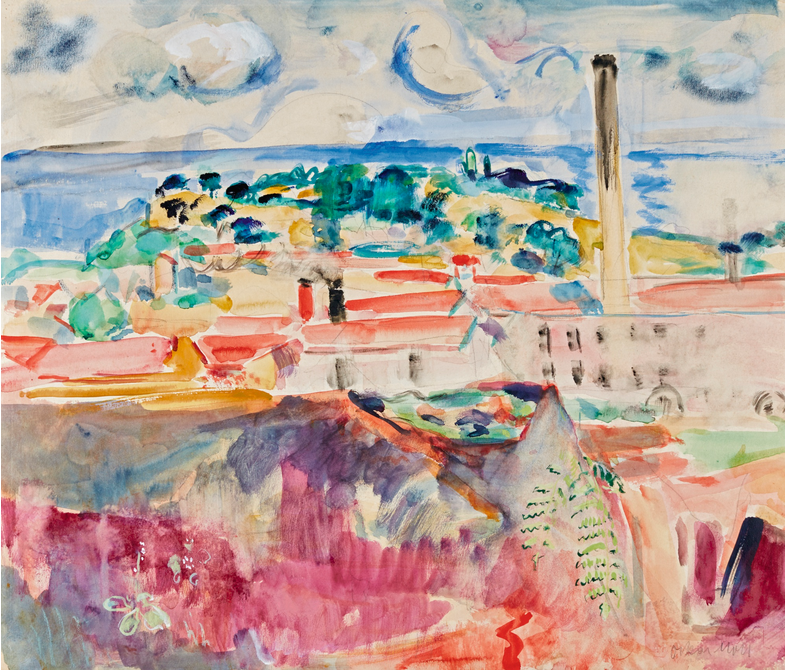
Southern Landscape with Factory

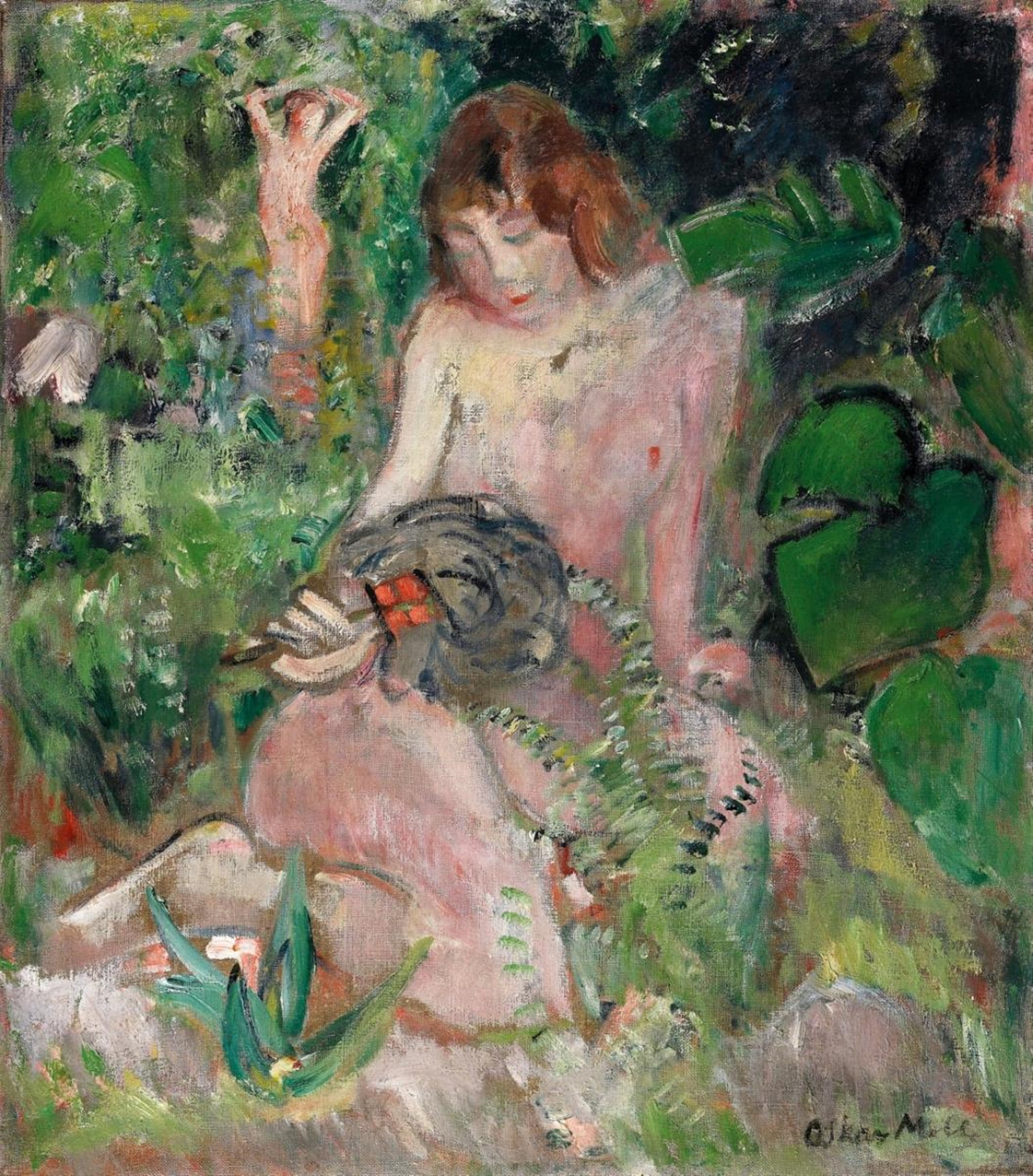
Nude with a Fan,
Amid the Leaves

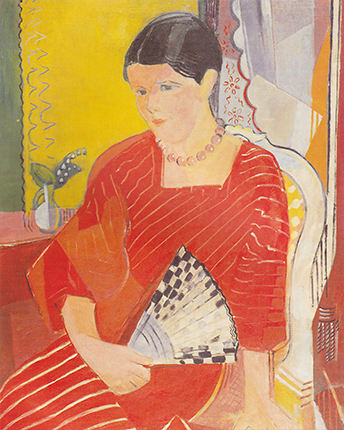
Brigitte (his daughter)
in a Red Dress
