= Erich Dieckmann =

German furniture designer (1896–1944)

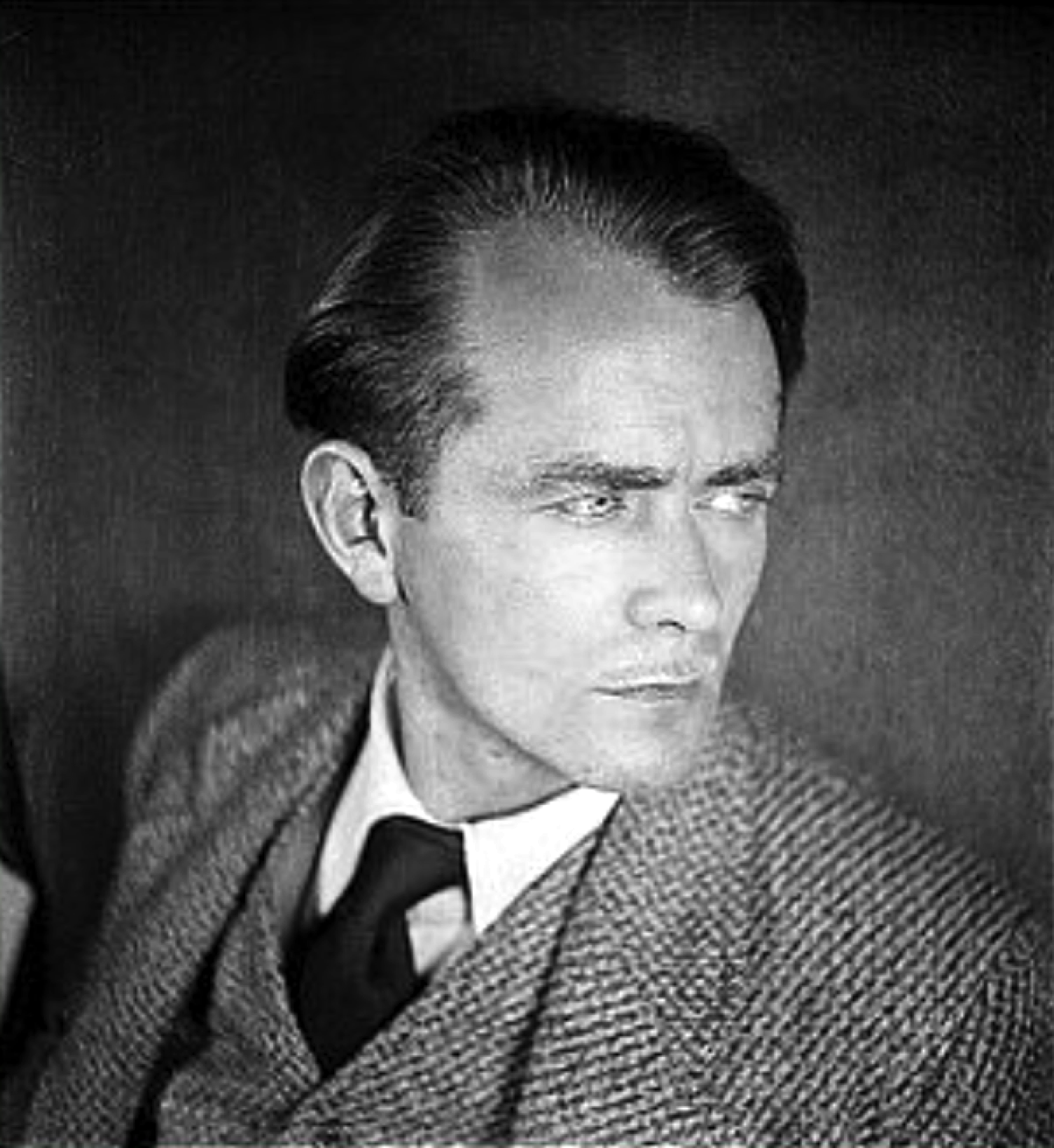
- Born: 1896
- Died: 1944 (aged 47–48)
- Education: Bauhaus
- Occupations: Designer, furniture designer

Signature
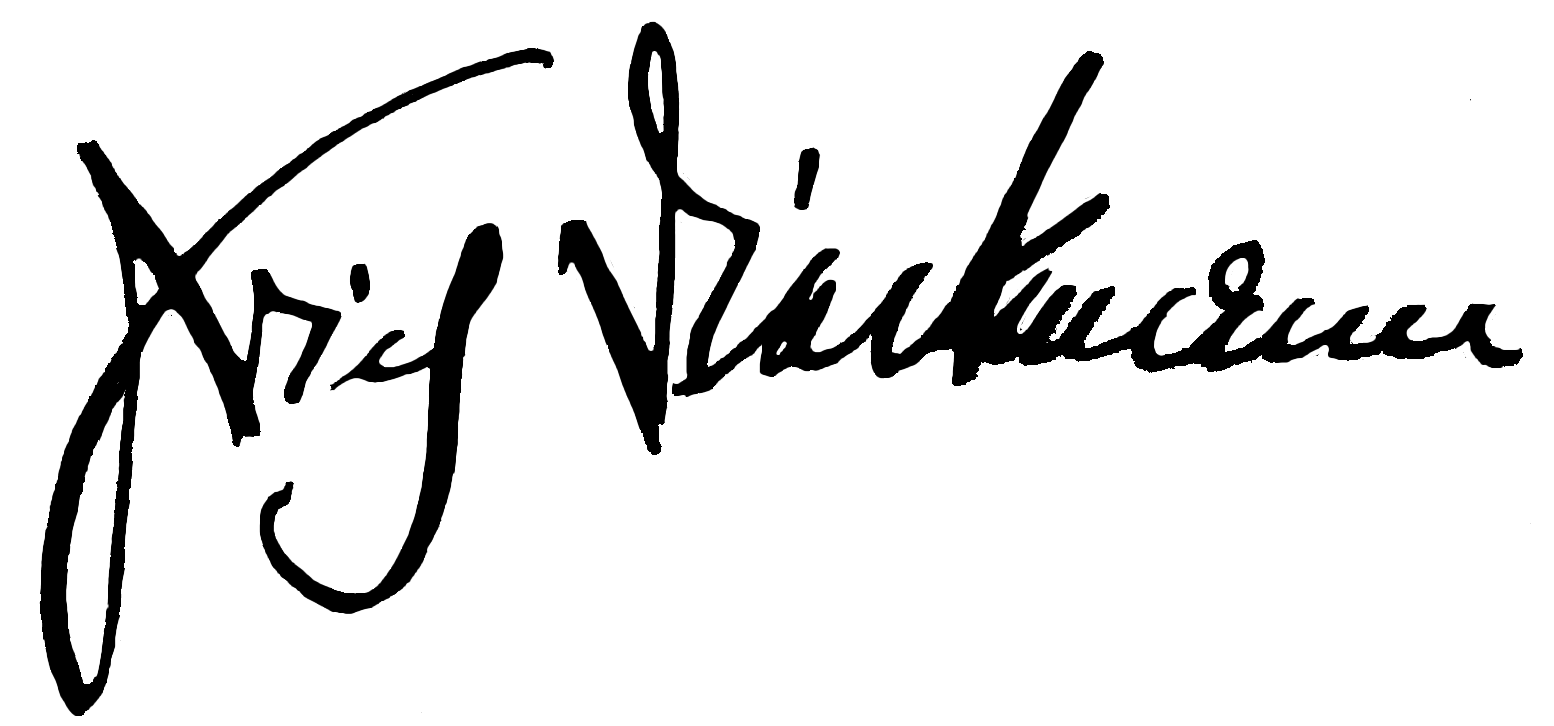

Erich Dieckmann (5 November 1896 – 8 November 1944) was a German carpenter, furniture designer, architect and university lecturer. Alongside Marcel Breuer, he is considered the most important furniture designer of the Bauhaus in Weimar and Dessau.

He primarily developed furniture (cabinets, tables, and seating furniture), initially made of wood in geometric shapes with rectangular frames and standardized designs, which enabled cost-effective production. Later, he also designed some organic seating furniture as well as carpet designs, clocks, furnishing and color concepts for functional interiors. His life and work fell into oblivion.

A piece of furniture has either grown organically, always developed from individual parts with a view to its intended purpose, or it has been cobbled together – from an elephant's body, a bay leaf, a spider's leg, if you will.

— Erich Dickmann, Möbelbau Holz-Rohr-Stahl,

== School, World War I, and education ==
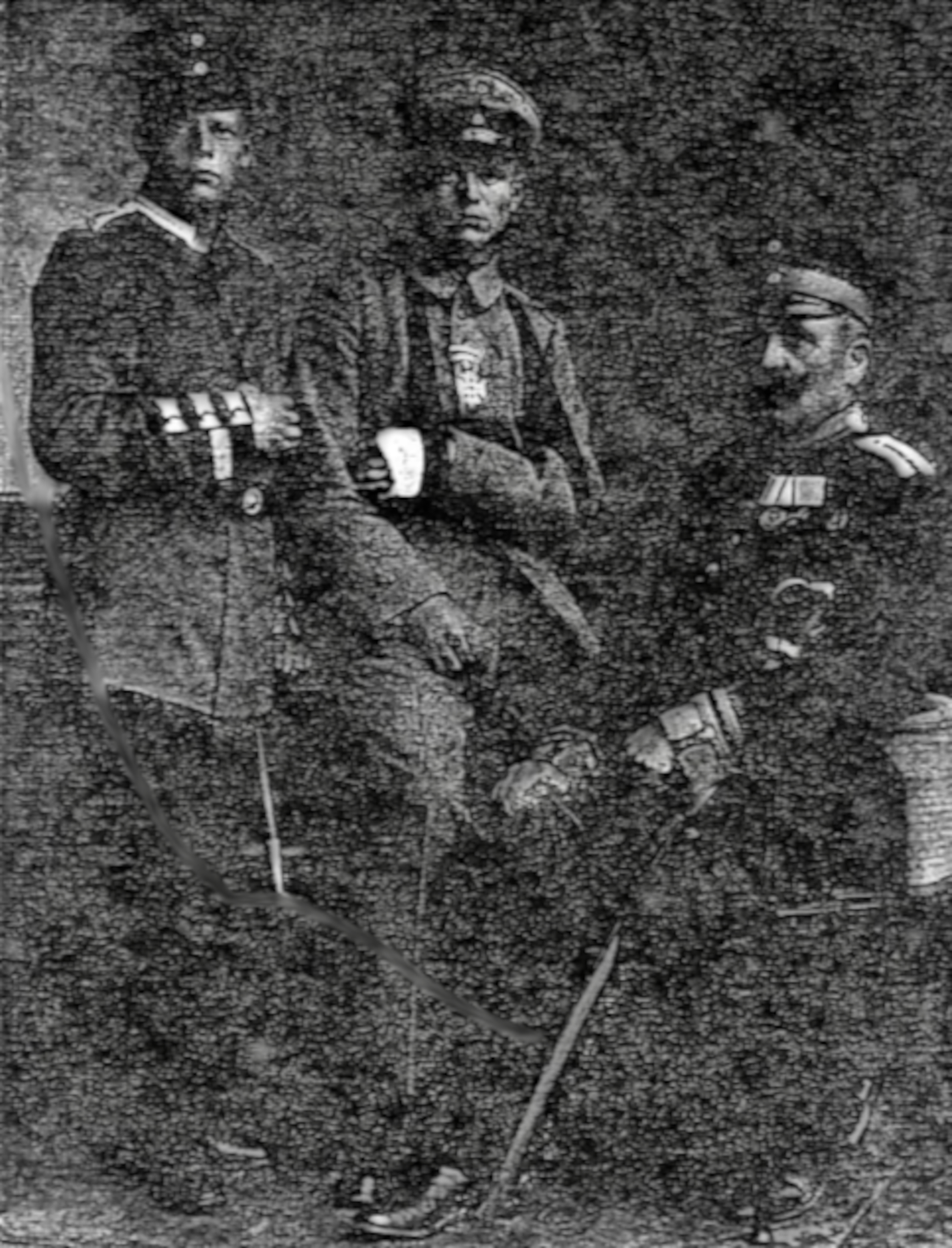
The seriously wounded Erich Dieckmann (center), decorated with the Iron Cross, with one of his two older brothers, also seriously wounded, and his father Hermann (1859–1924), seated, ca. 1917

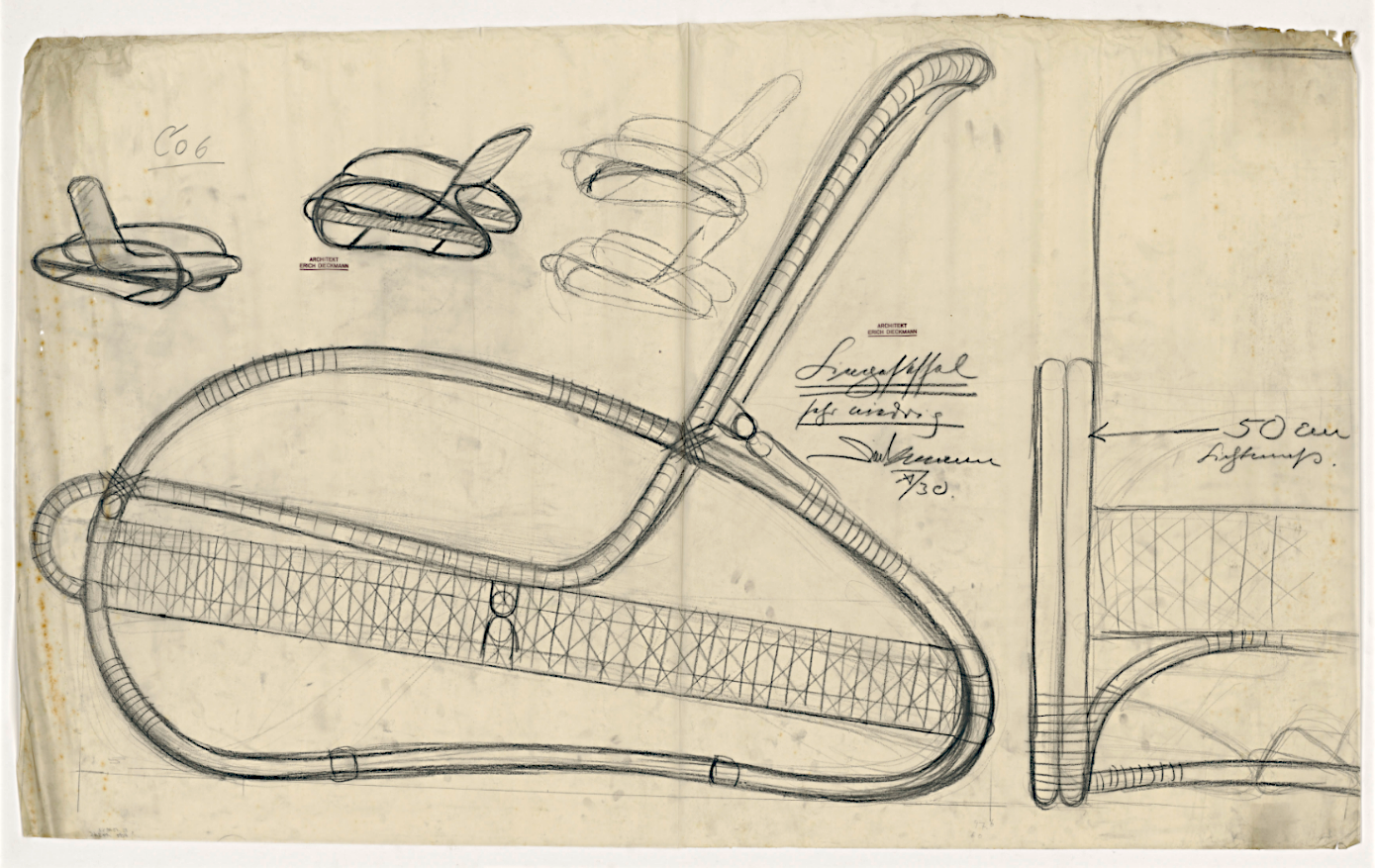
Design of a recliner chair, Co 6 (Furniture designs, wicker furniture) Erich Dieckmann 1930

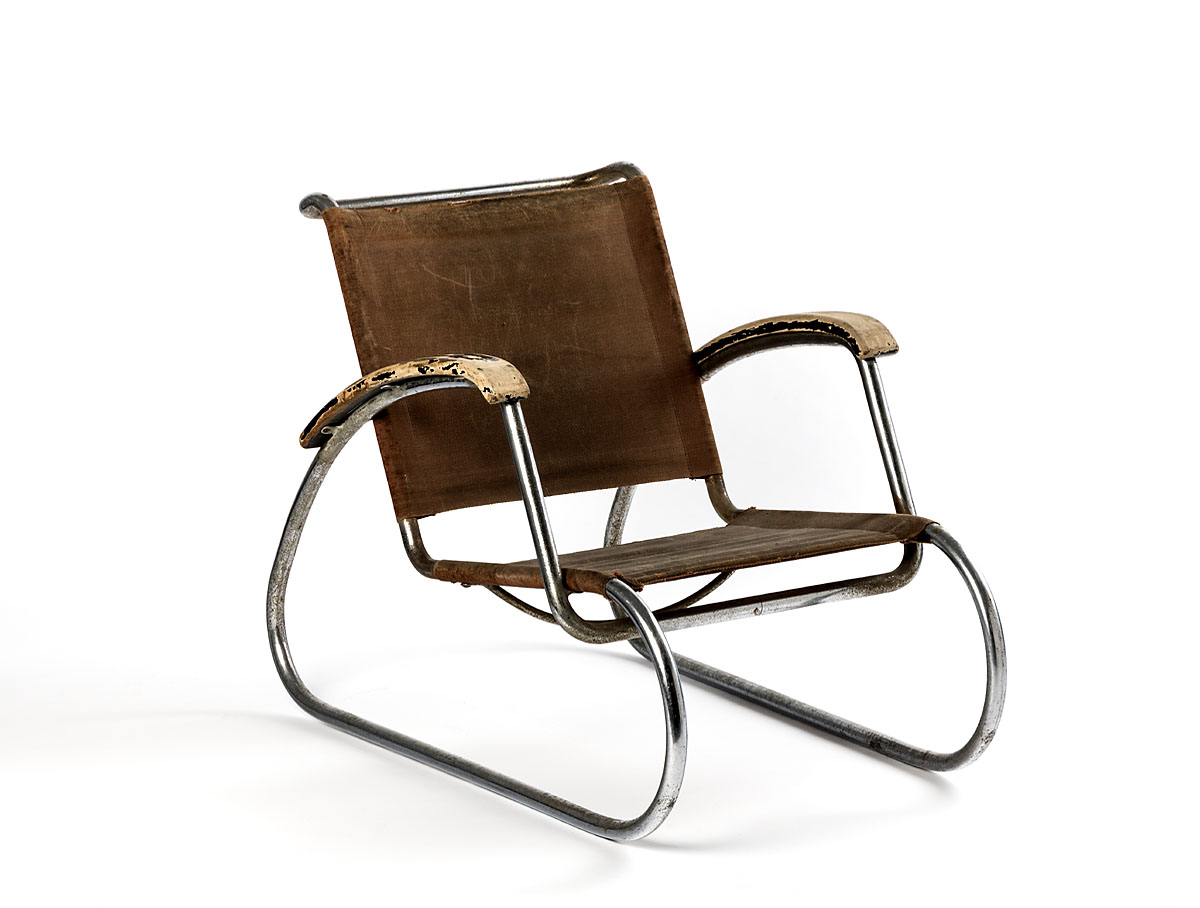
Tubular steel chair model Cabaso, (possible model 8239) 1931 Erich Dieckmann

After attending school in Bad Bentheim, Erich Dieckmann went to the Realgymnasium in Goslar, graduating in 1913 with the "Einjährige" (intermediate secondary school leaving certificate). At the age of 16, he went to sea as a cabin boy on the sailing ship Jonny for about a year to learn the seafaring trade, traveling to countries such as Russia, Great Britain, Spain, and Africa. After the outbreak of the First World War in August 1914, like many enthusiastic and patriotic Germans, he voluntarily enlisted in the war navy at the age of 17 and volunteered for service, but due to a lack of demand, he was drafted into the Imperial Army and, after the Battle of the Marne, was assigned to the Reserve Jäger Battalion No. 23 in Goslar (I. Res. Jäg. 23, in the Green Corps), which was subordinate to the 51st Reserve Division and its subdivision, the 101st Reserve Infantry Brigade. The Reserve Jäger Battalion No. 23 was sent to the Western Front. In the fall of 1914, Dieckmann took part in the First Battle of Flanders, and in 1915 he was involved in the capture of Langemarck north of Ypres. His left forearm was shattered there by a Canadian explosive shell. His forearm and left hand were painstakingly reconstructed with implants using the methods available at the time, which meant that Dieckmann spent almost two years in military hospitals, most recently in Göttingen. Due to his permanent physical disability, he was certified as having a 50% "restriction on earning capacity", and had to give up his dream of becoming a sailor. His older brother Ernst (1895–1916) was killed, at the age of 18, on the Western Front in the Argonne, and another older brother was seriously wounded, like Erich.

In order to study, he returned to secondary school and graduated with the Reifeprüfung (school leaving certificate). He studied architecture at the Technical University of Danzig from 1918 to 1920, but dropped out after his pre-diplomabecause he disliked both the methodology and the goals of technical university education.

After completing his preliminary architecture degree, he began studying painting and drawing in Dresden, but was dissatisfied with the program.

== At the Bauhaus Weimar ==
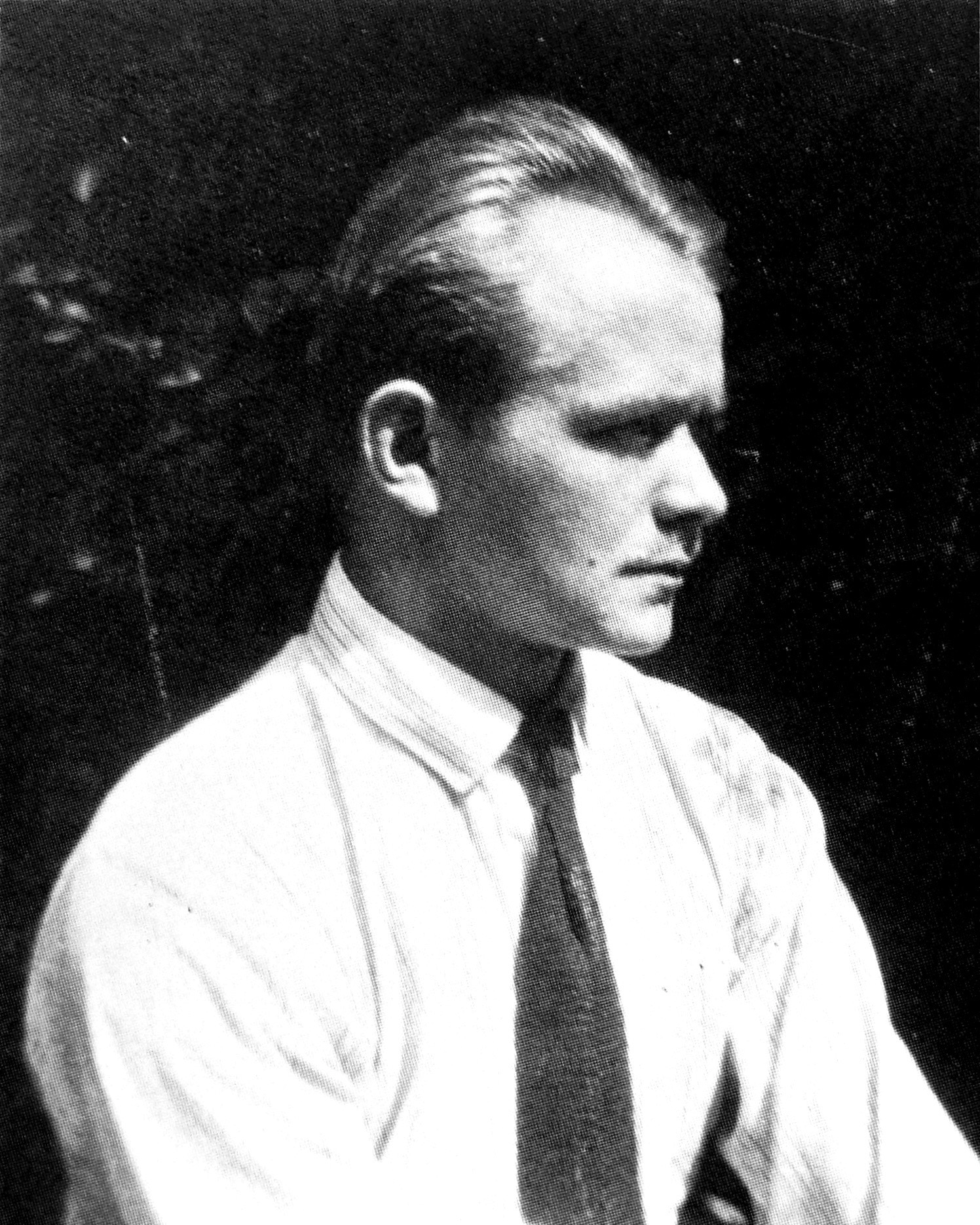
Erich Dieckmann at the beginning of his studies and apprenticeship at the Bauhaus in Weimar, around 1921 Artist signature Erich Dieckmann (furniture designer) short form from 1921

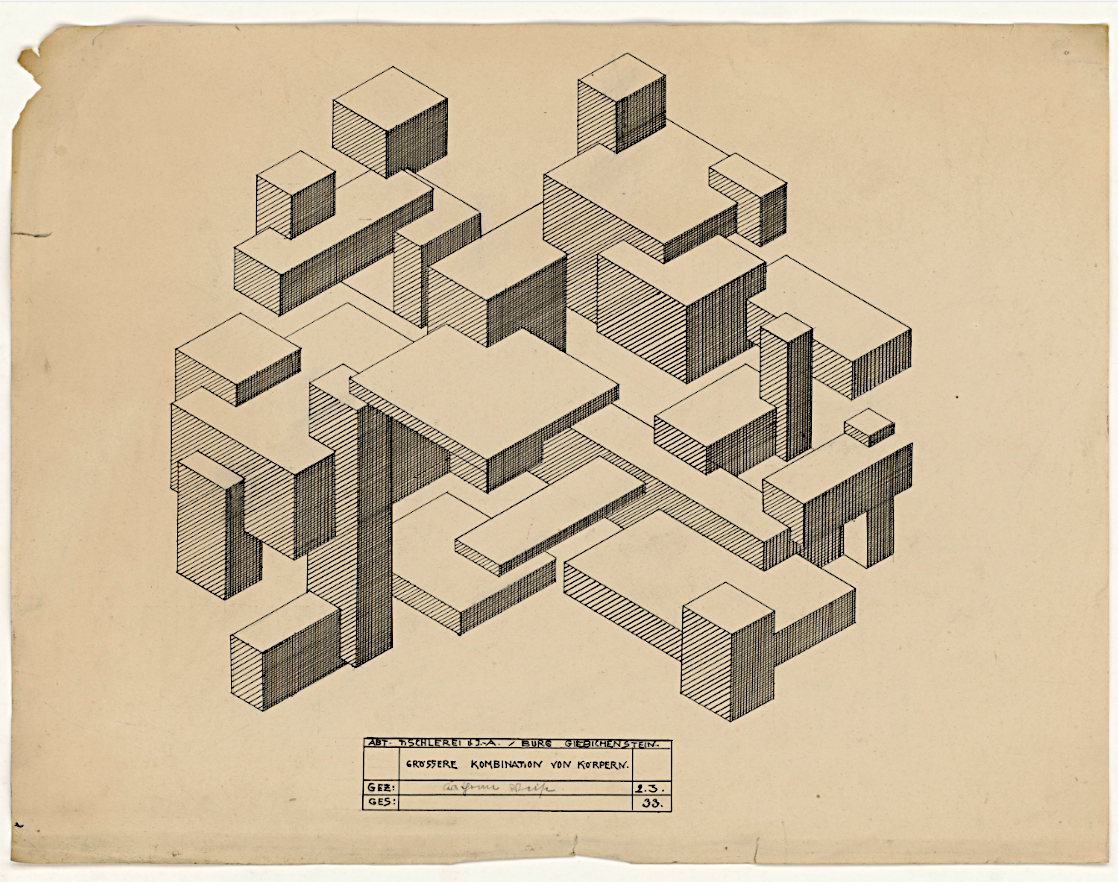
Larger combination of bodies (composition studies, geometric) 02-03-1933 Erich Dieckmann

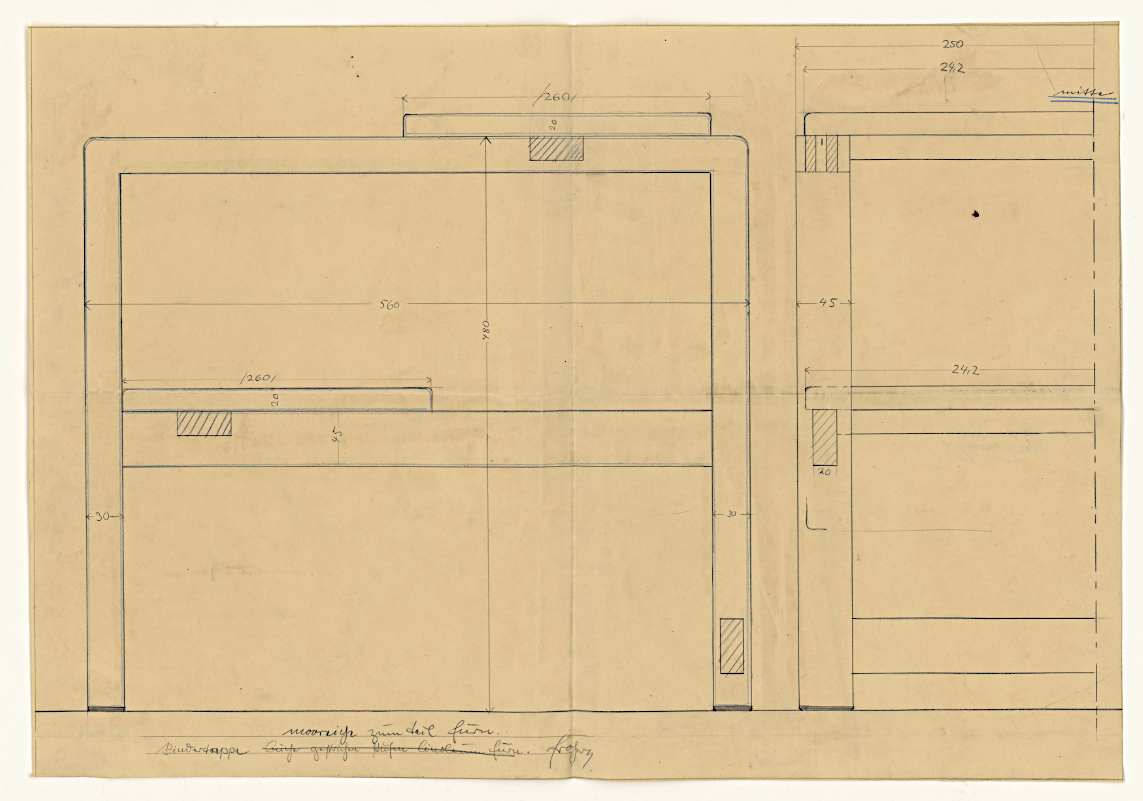
Children's Staircase 2 (Furniture Designs, Children's Furniture)

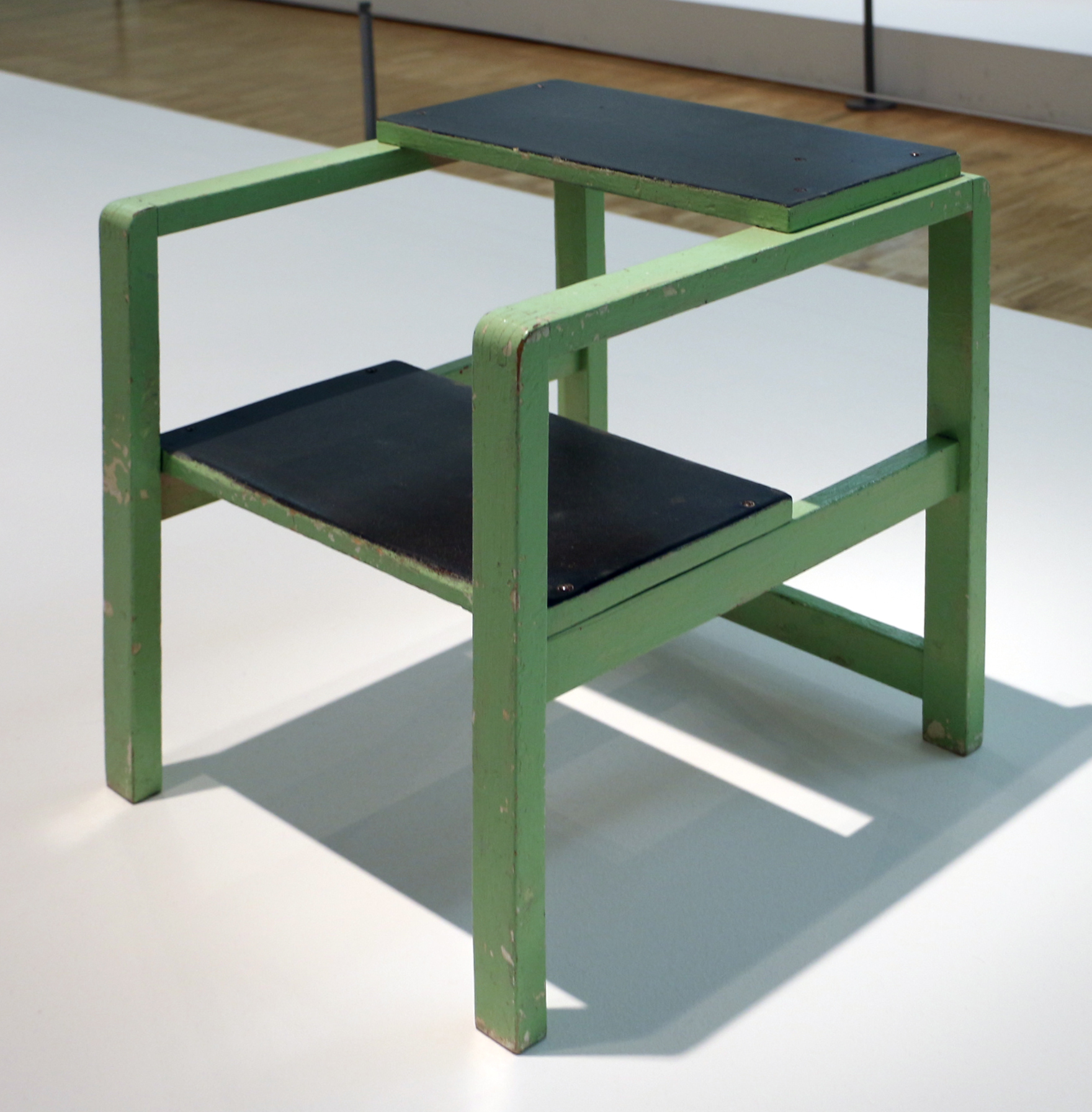
Children's staircase Erich Dieckmann, ca. 1925

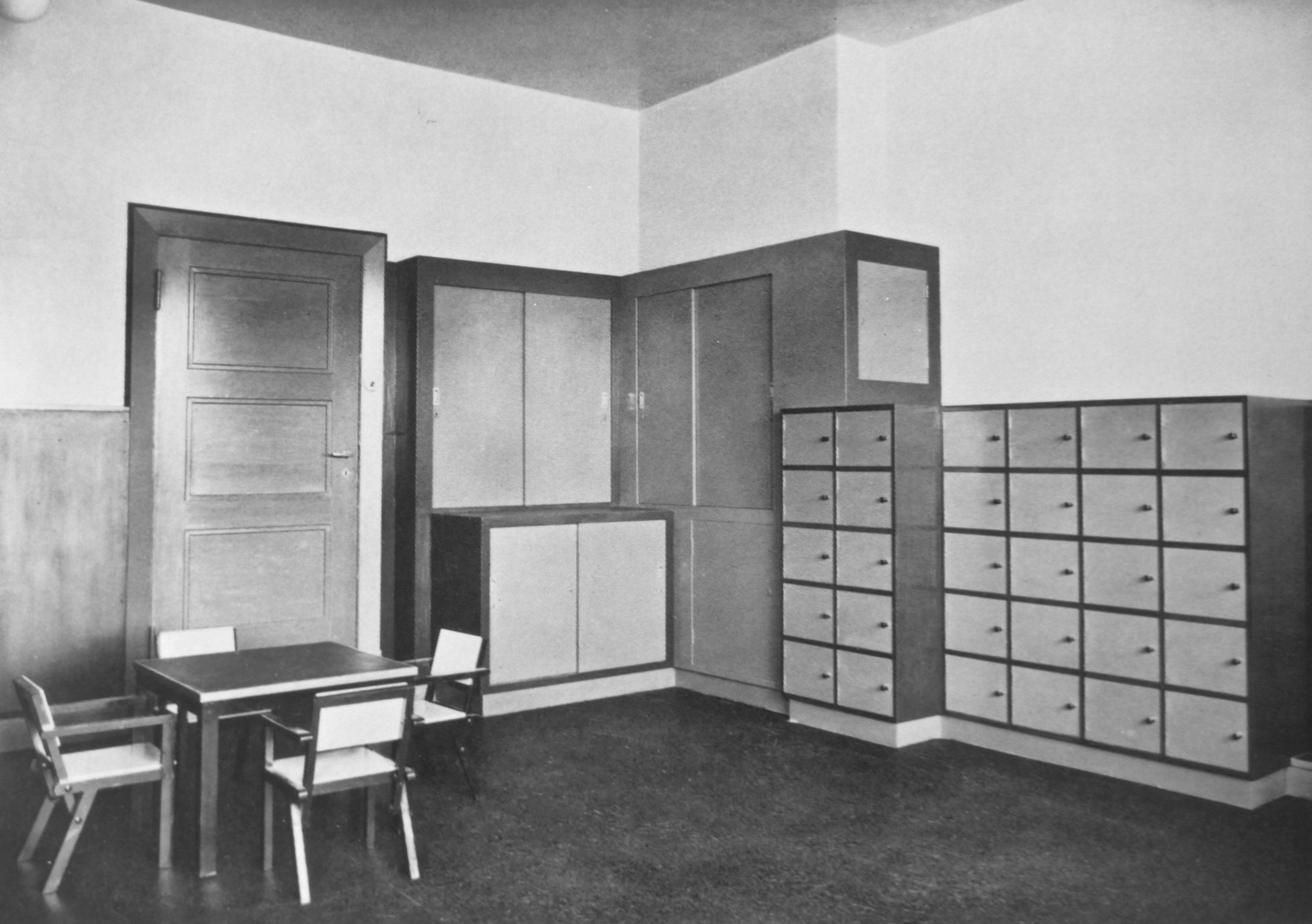
Day room at the children's home in the Freiland-Siedlung Gildenhall near Neuruppin, 1926

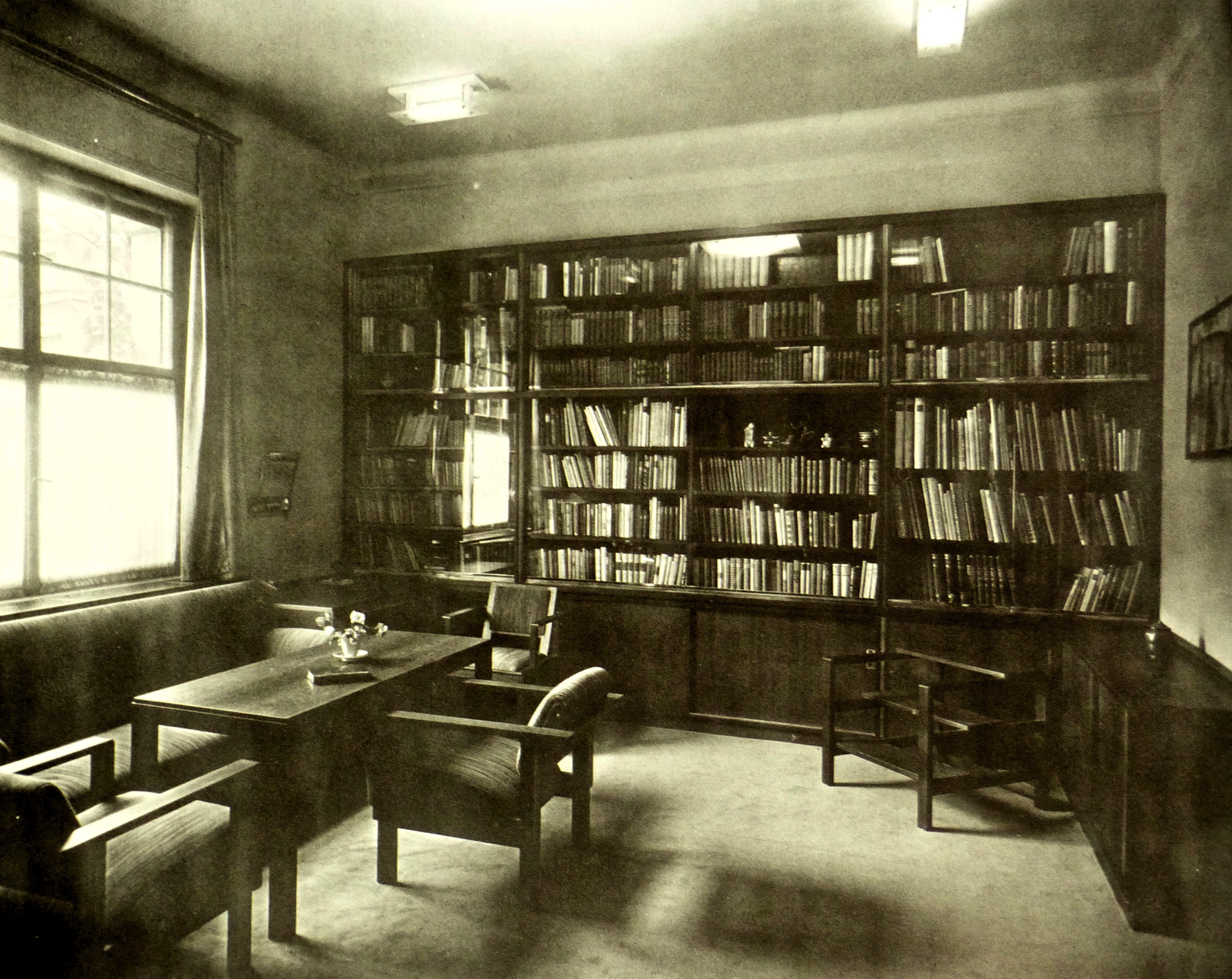
Planning and furnishing of the library of Otto Bamberger in the Villa Sonnenhaus in Lichtenfels

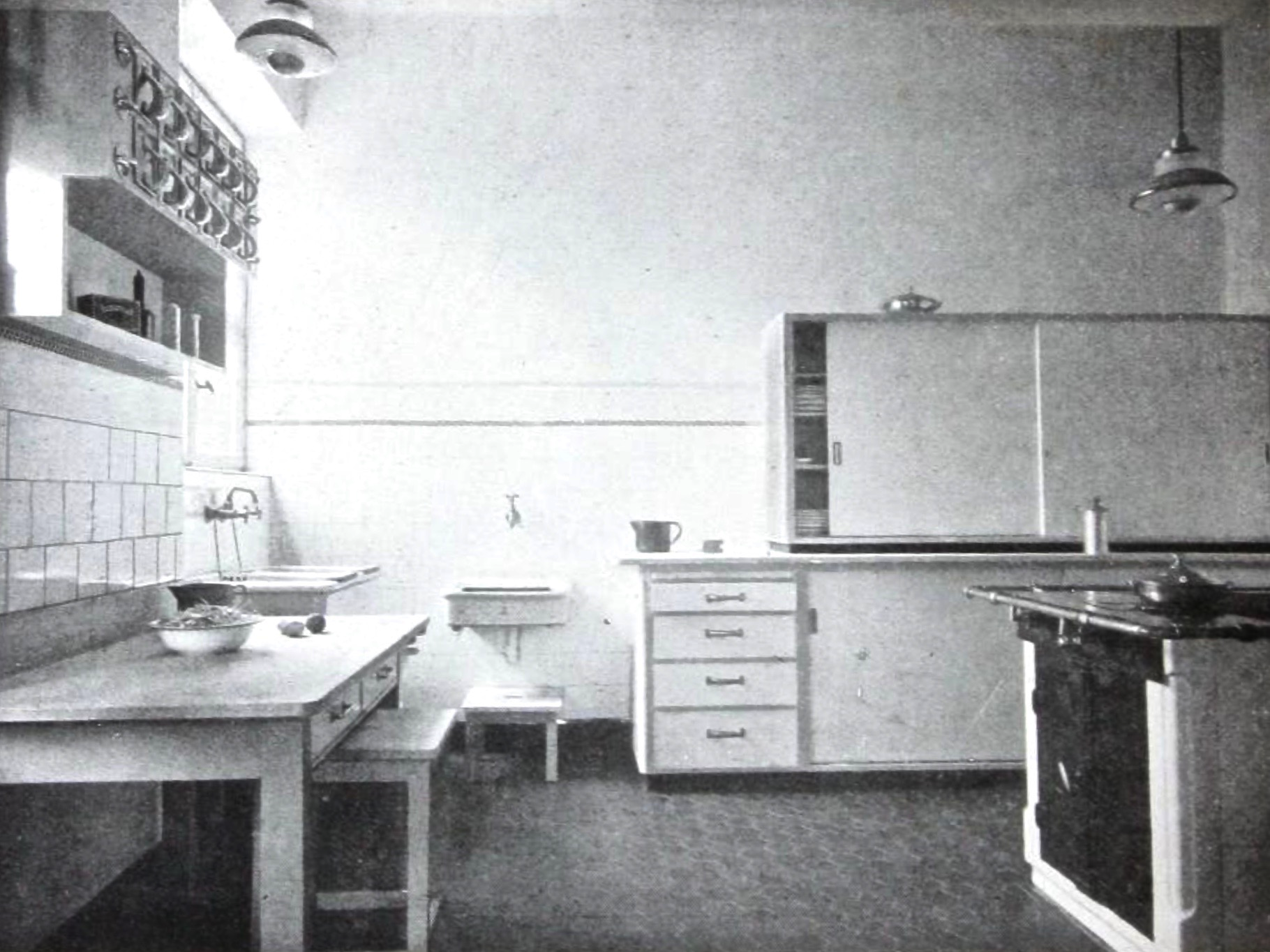
Kitchen furnishings, including ceiling lights, by Erich Dieckmann and Karl Keller (1903–1979) for Otto Bamberger in the Villa Sonnenhaus in Lichtenfels, May 1928

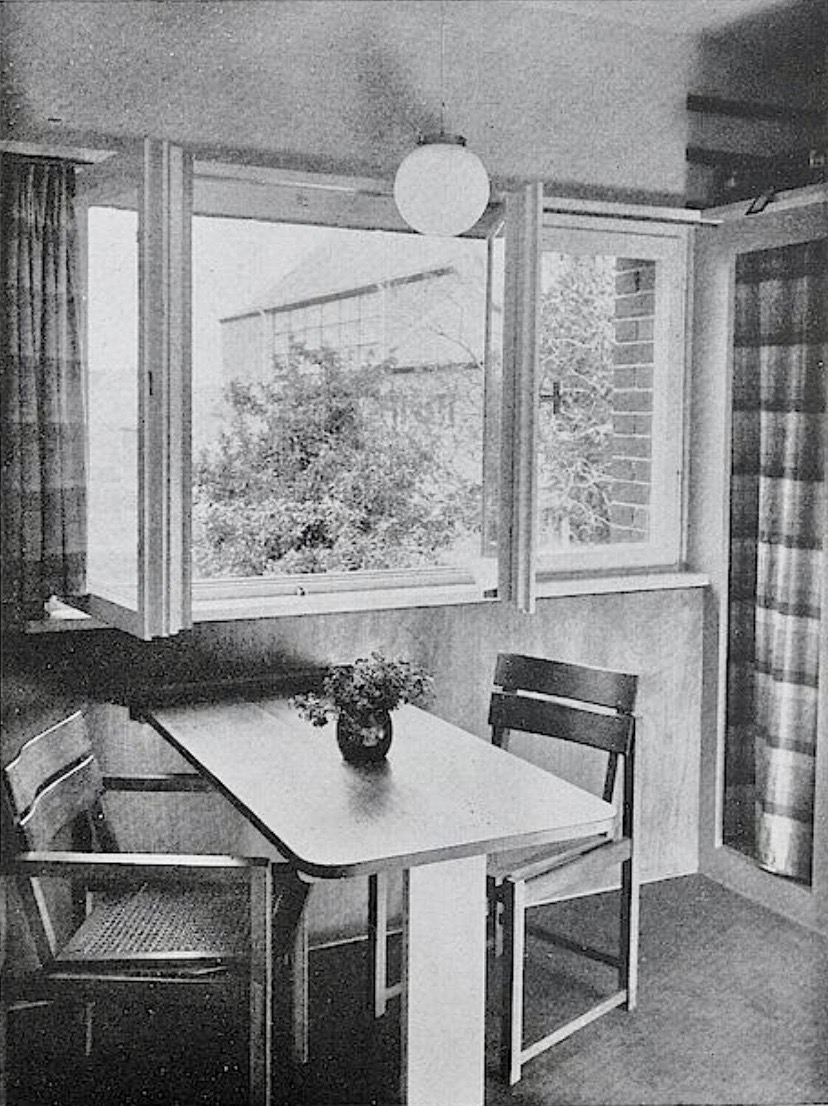
Furnishing of small 9 m^{2} student rooms in the Music House in Frankfurt (Oder) with built-in cupboard, bed alcove as seating, curtain and upholstery fabrics, 1929; ceiling lamp: Wilhelm Wagenfeld

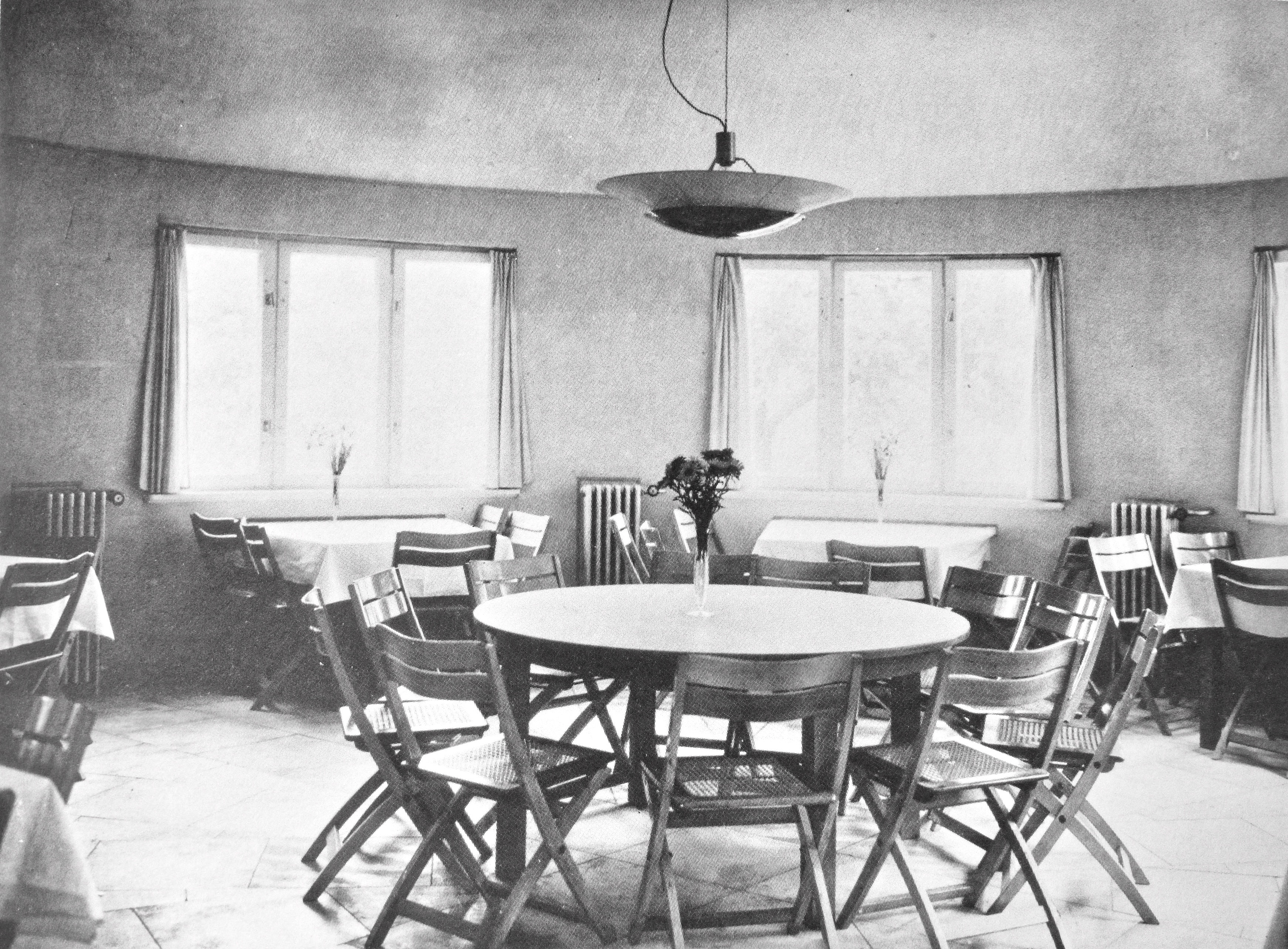
Dining room in the rotunda of the Musikheim in Frankfurt (Oder), 1929

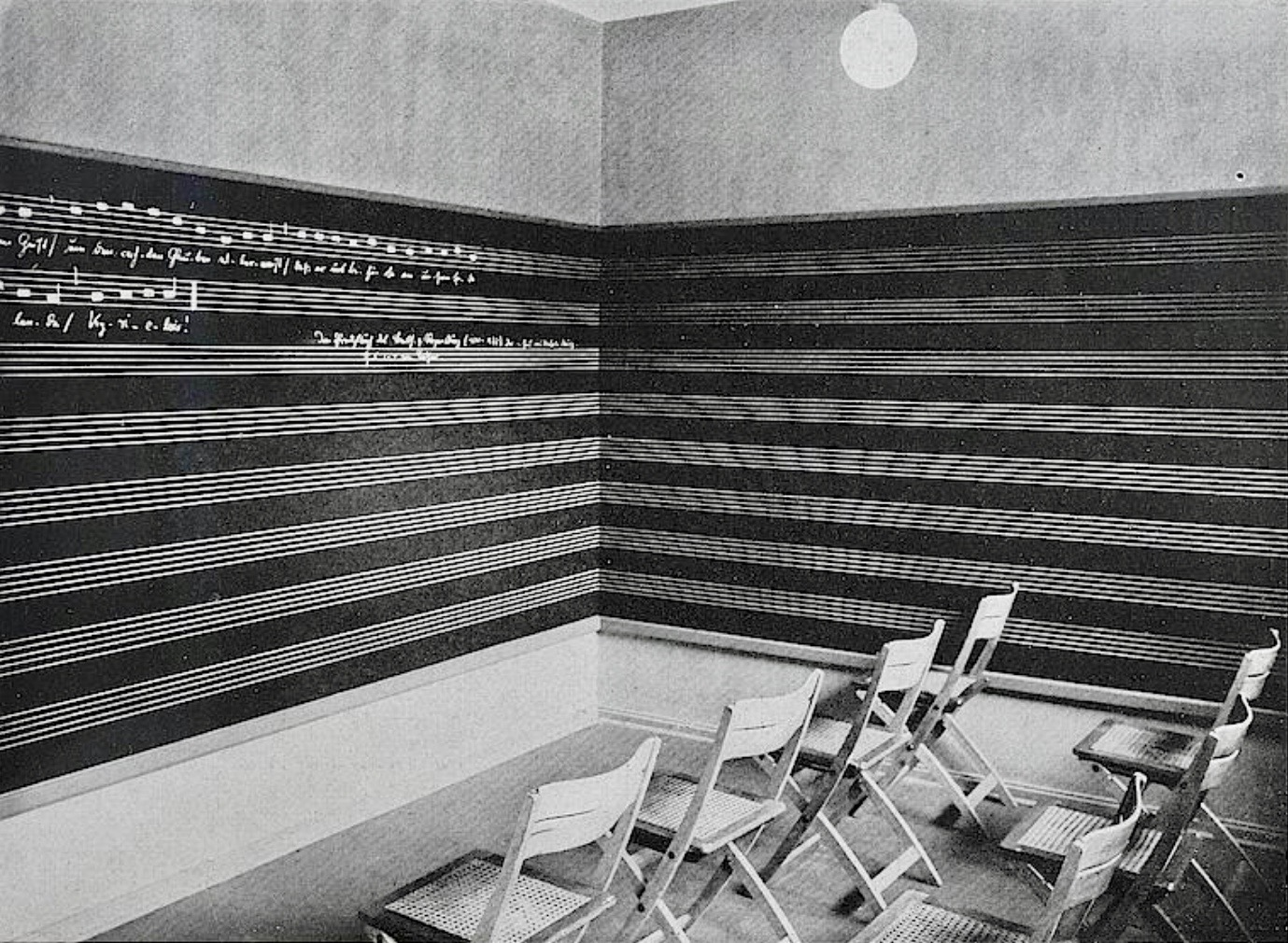
Classroom in the Music Center in Frankfurt (Oder), 1929; ceiling lamp: Wilhelm Wagenfeld

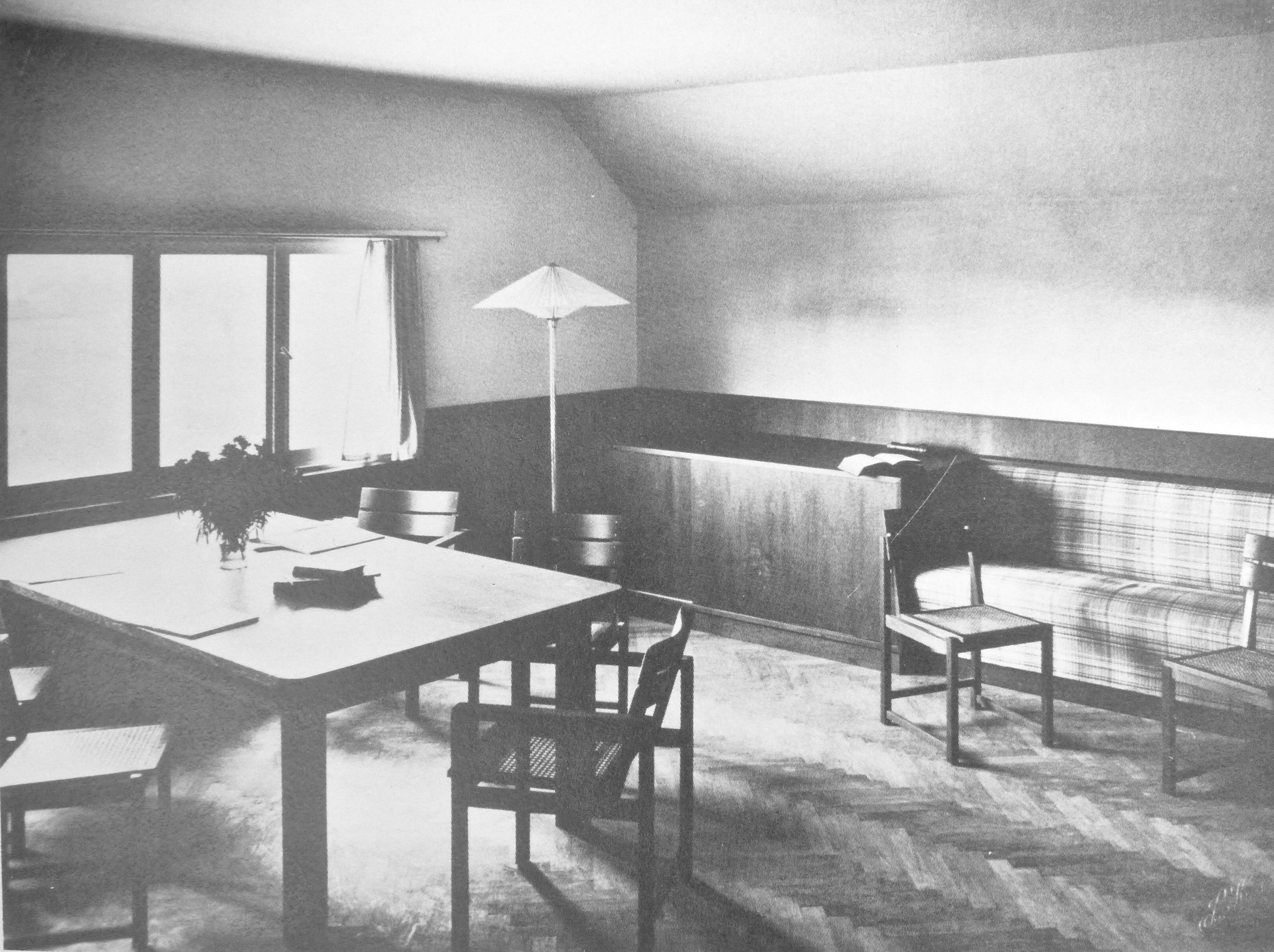
Workshop in the Music House in Frankfurt (Oder), 1929

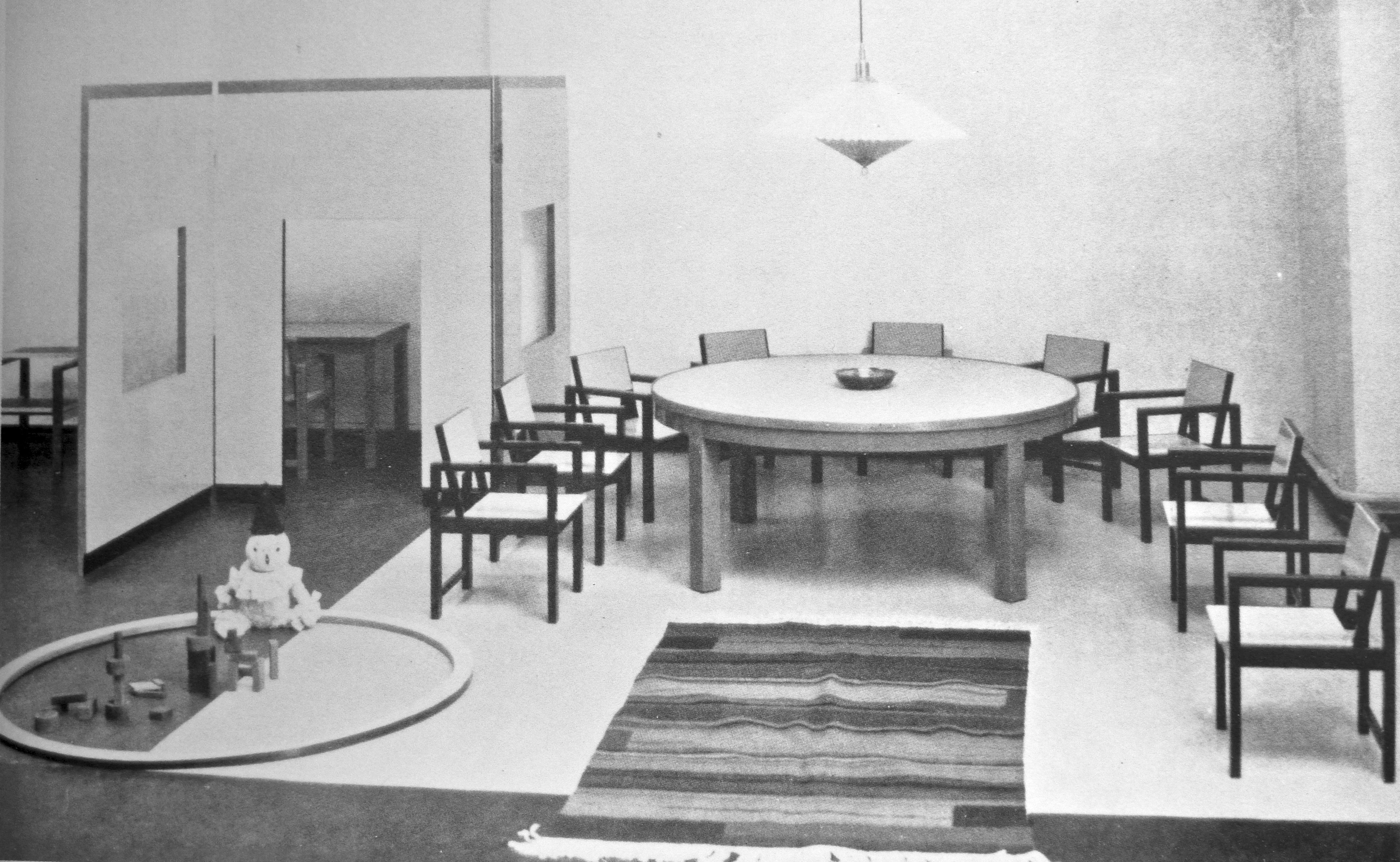
Playroom at the Feodora Children's Home in Weimar, 1930

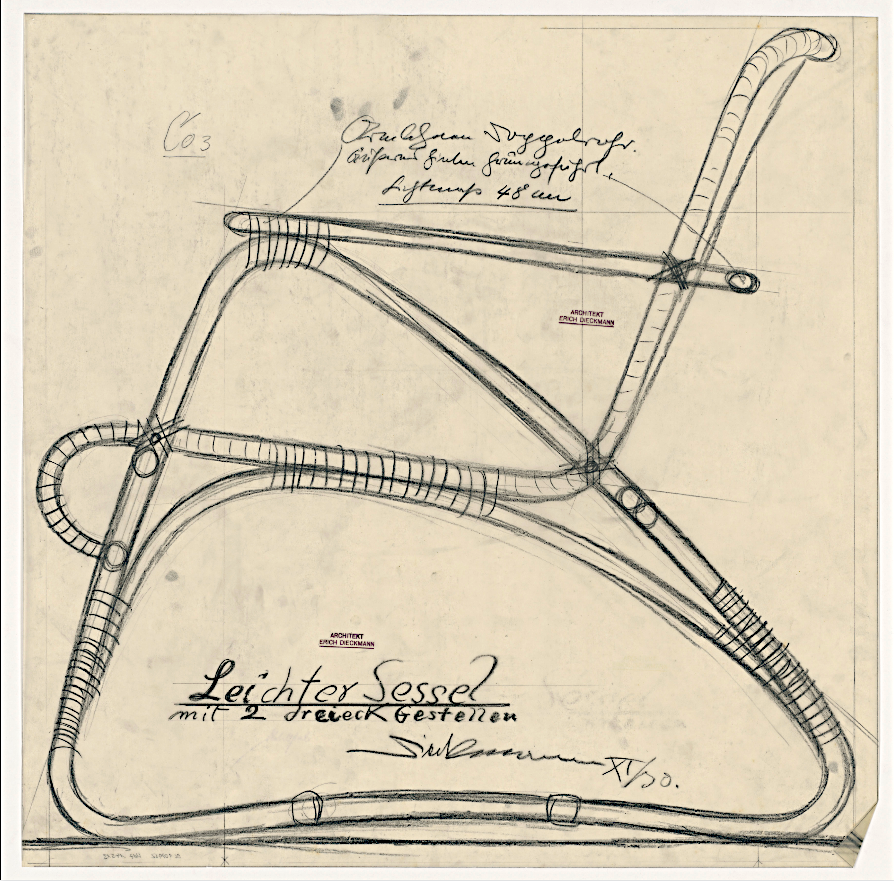
Design for a light armchair, model Co 3 (furniture designs, wicker furniture) pencil on tracing paper, Erich Dieckmann 1930

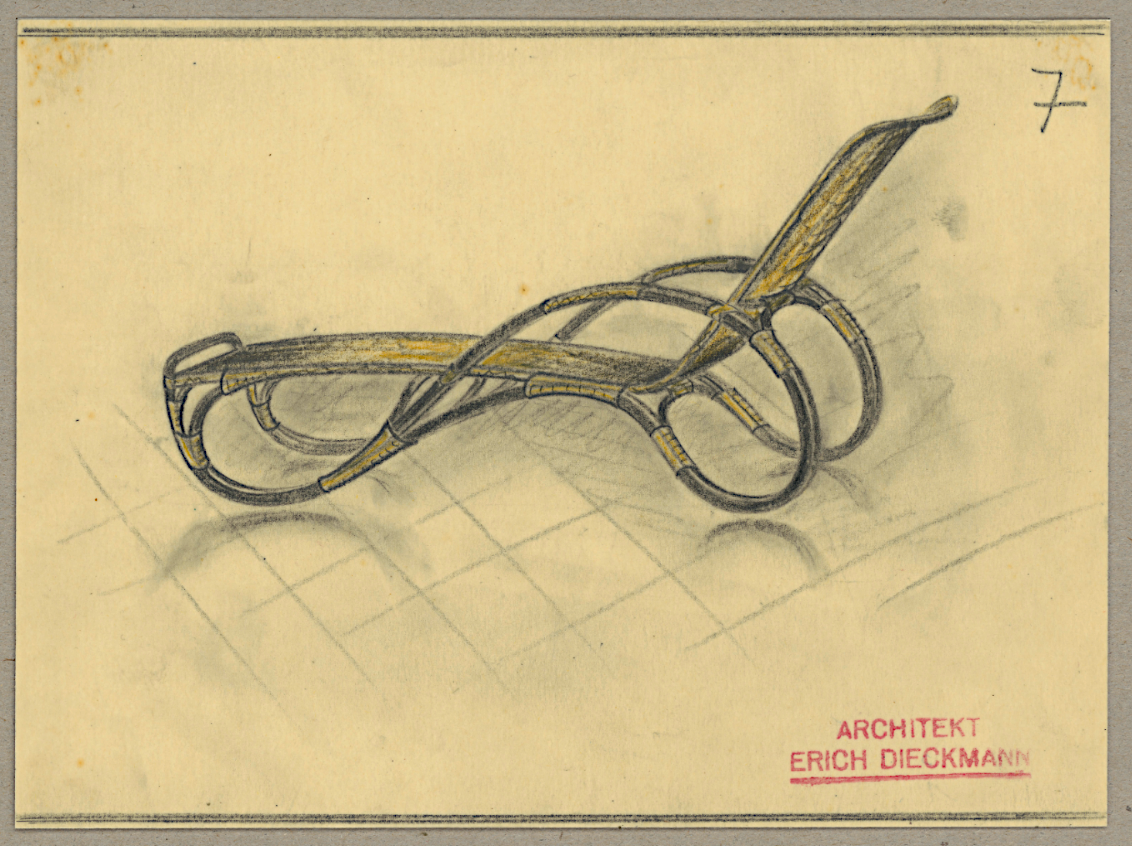
Draft pencil, pen in yellow, on tracing paper deck chair Dal Vera Model 7 (furniture designs, wicker furniture), Erich Dieckmann 1934

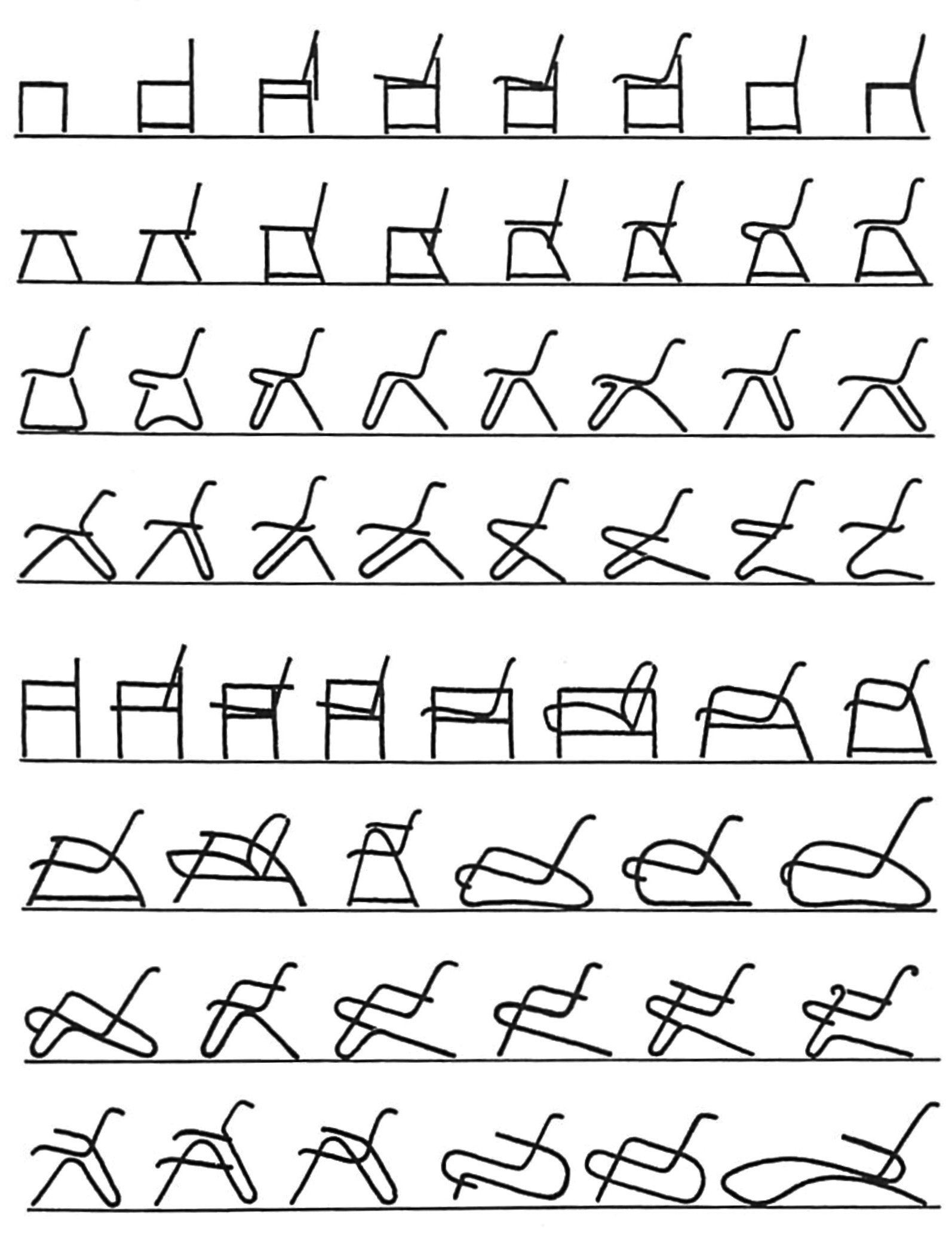
Seating furniture development series by Erich Dieckmann, 1931

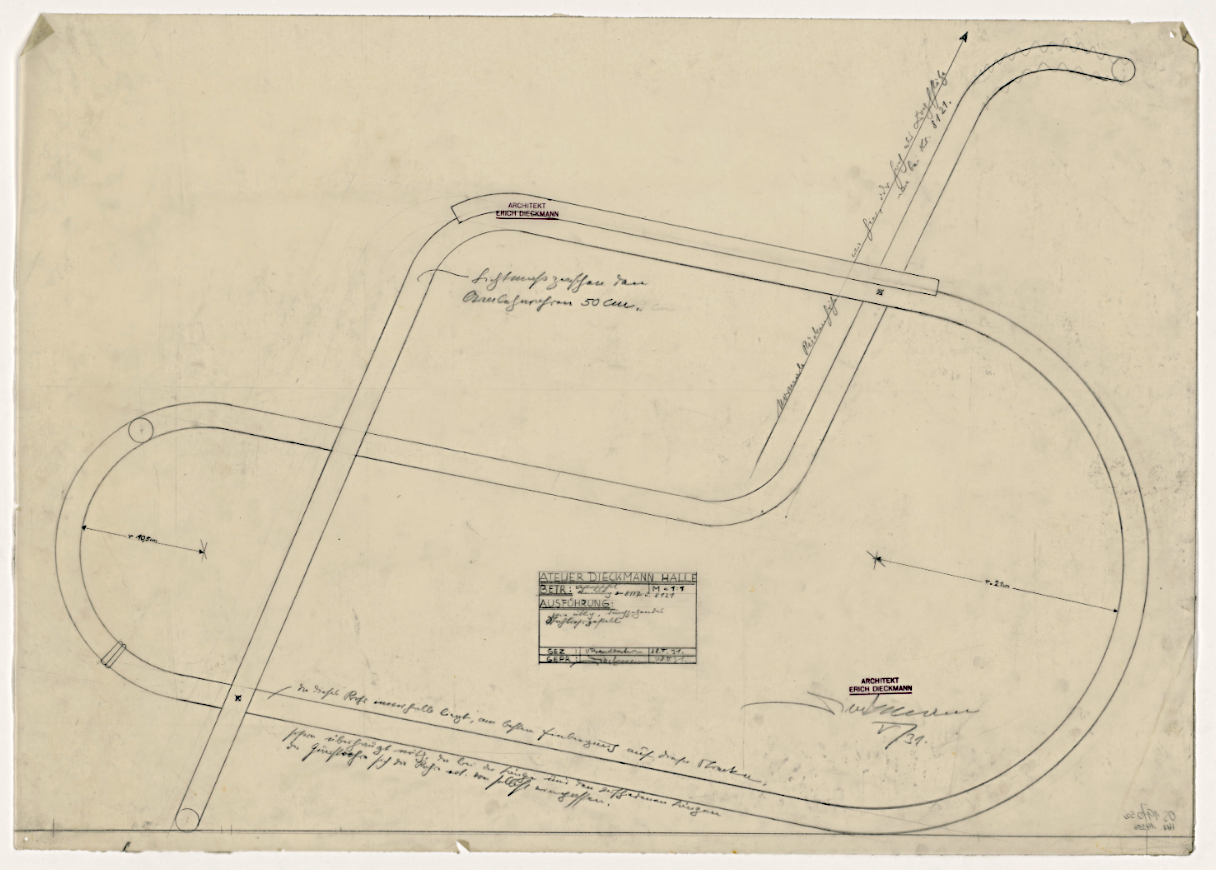
Design tubular steel chair (furniture designs, tubular steel furniture) pencil on tracing paper, Erich Dieckmann 1931

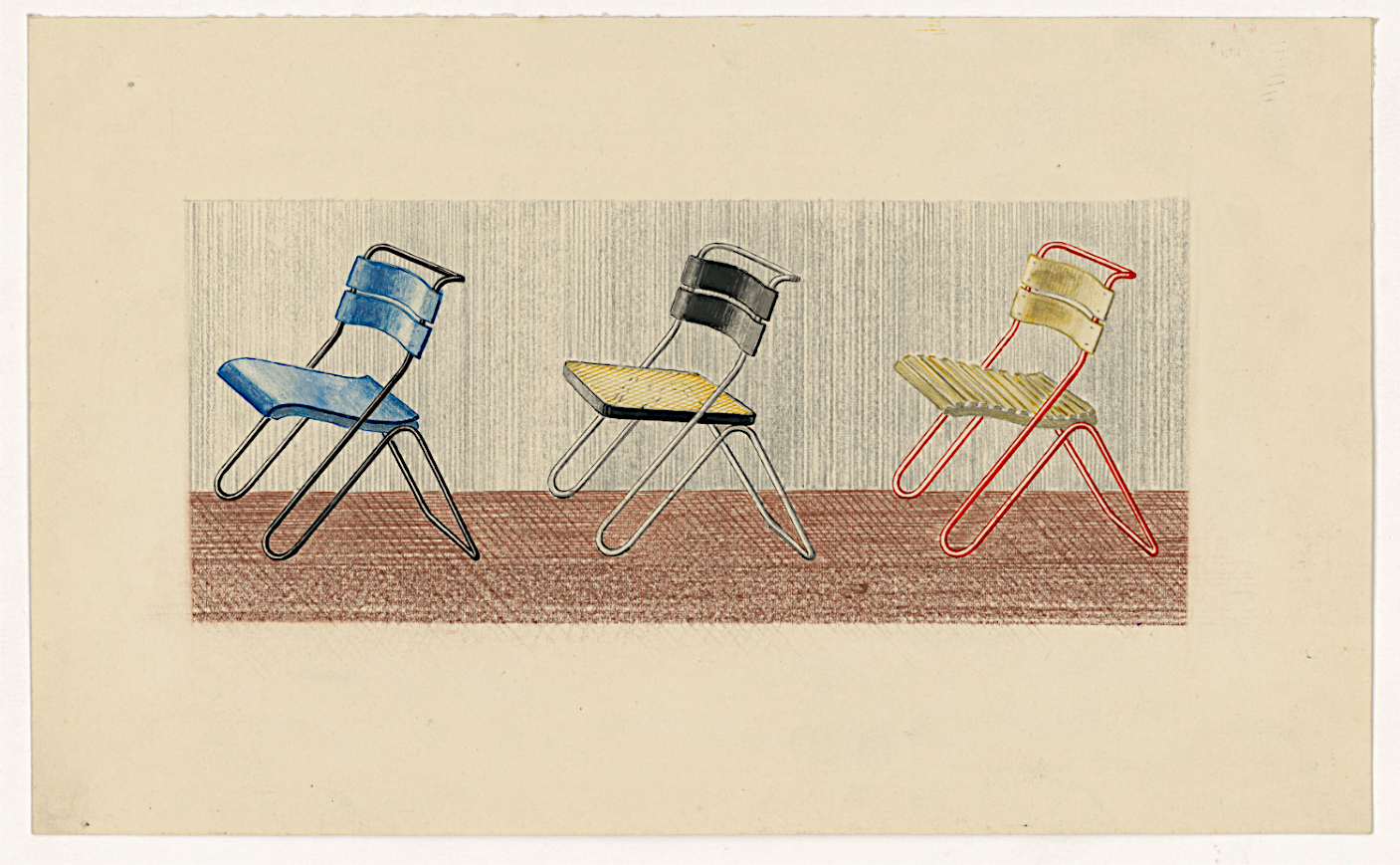
Drei Stühle (Möbelentwürfe, Stahlrohrmöbel) zwischen 1925 – 1935 Erich Dieckmann

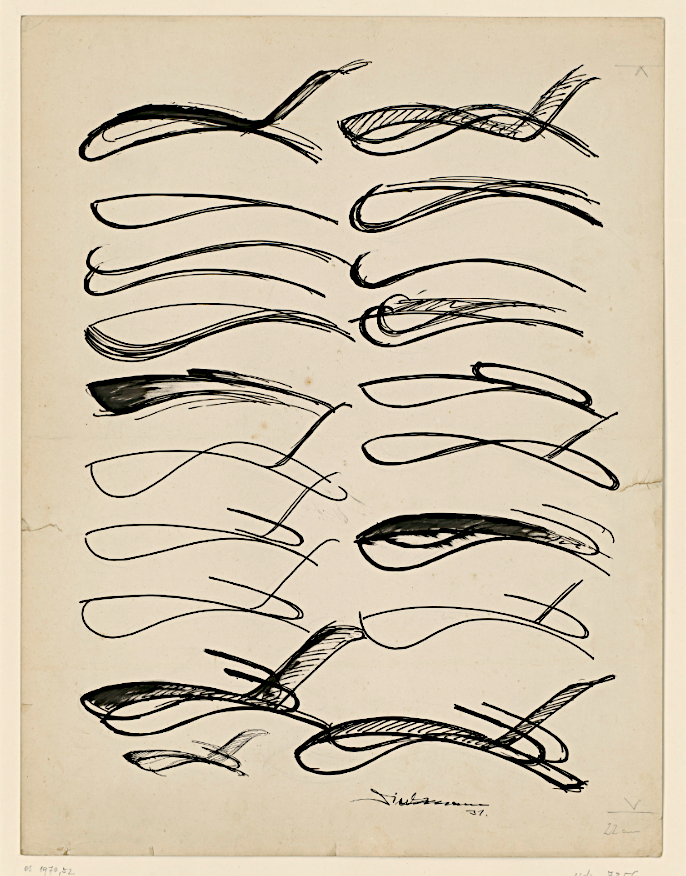
Designs for tubular steel lounge chairs (furniture manufacturer, Stuttgart) Erich Dieckmann 1931

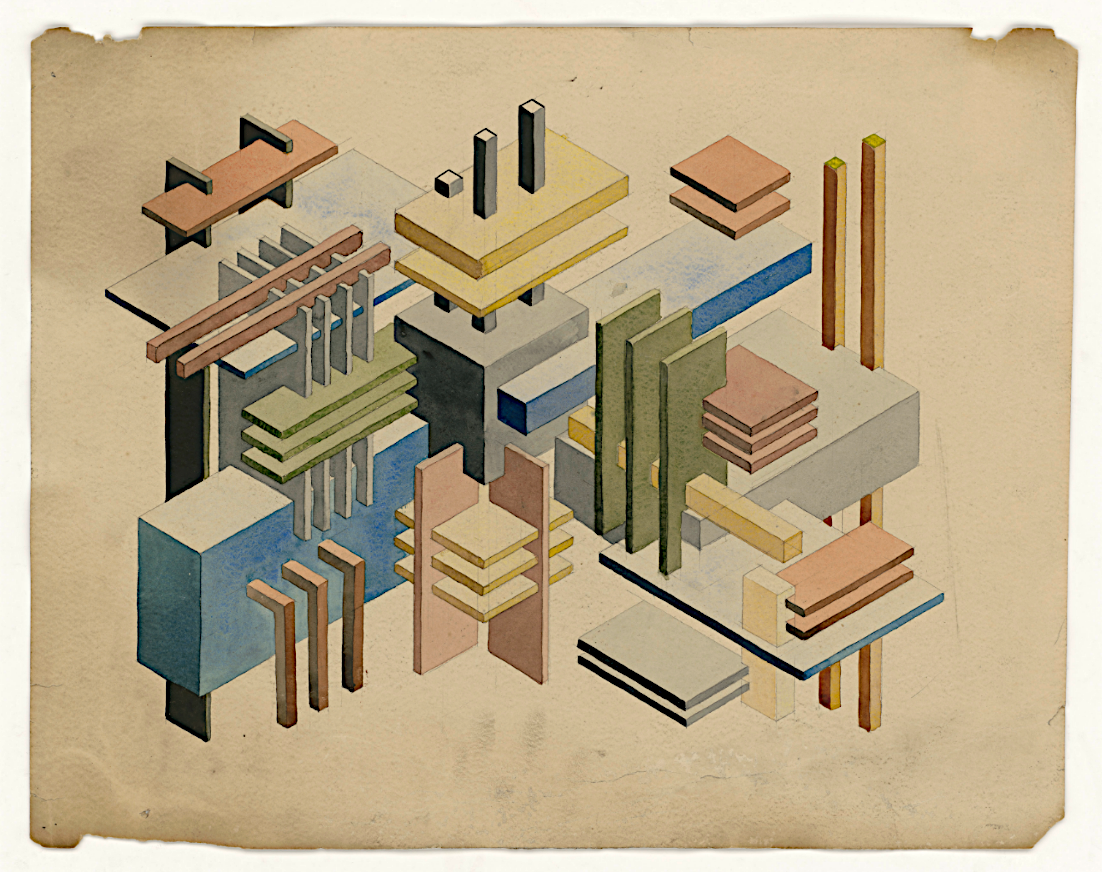
Composition of various elements (composition studies, geometric) 1932 Erich Dieckmann pencil, brush, watercolor in red, yellow, blue, green and gray, on paper

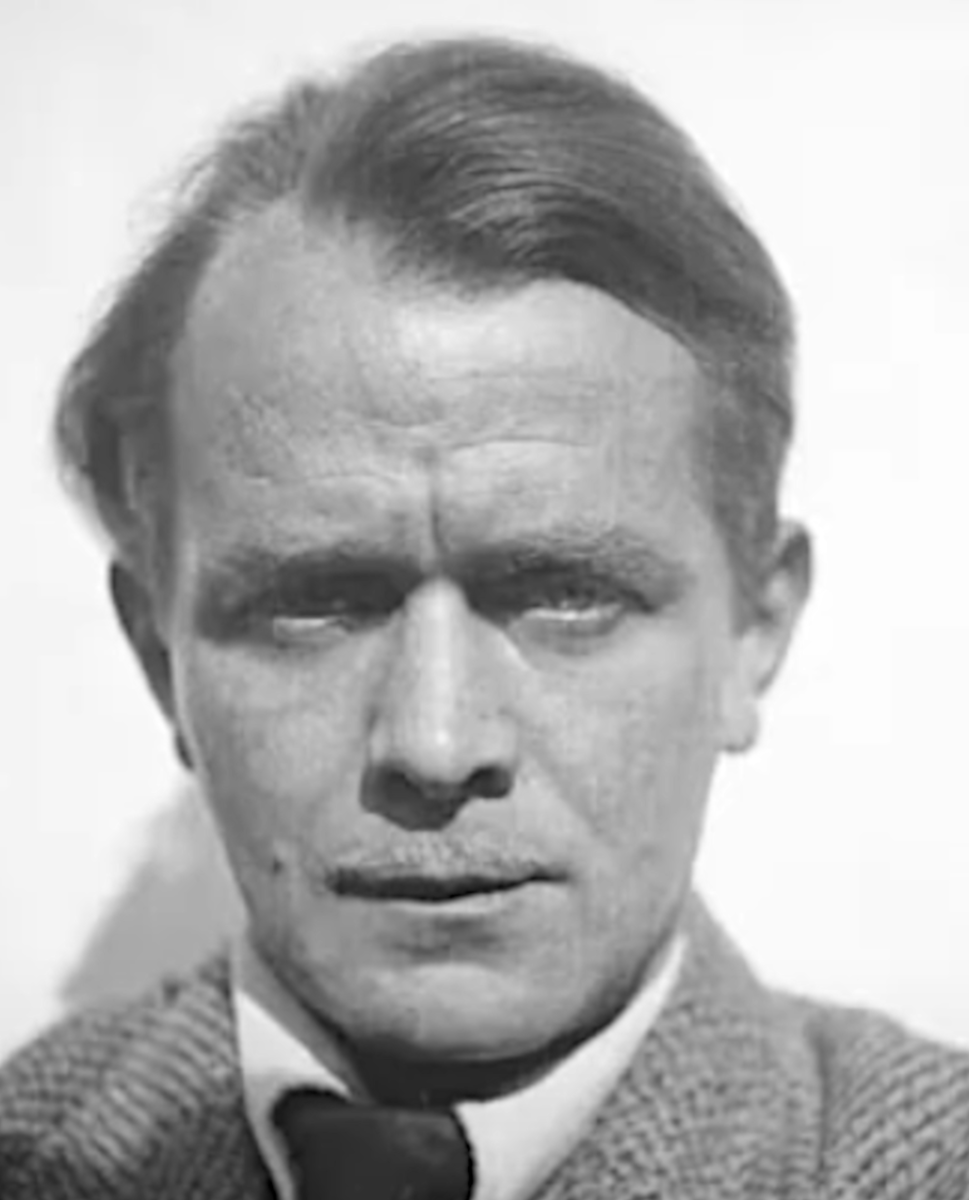
Erich Dieckmann, ca. 1930 passport photo (Photographer unknown)

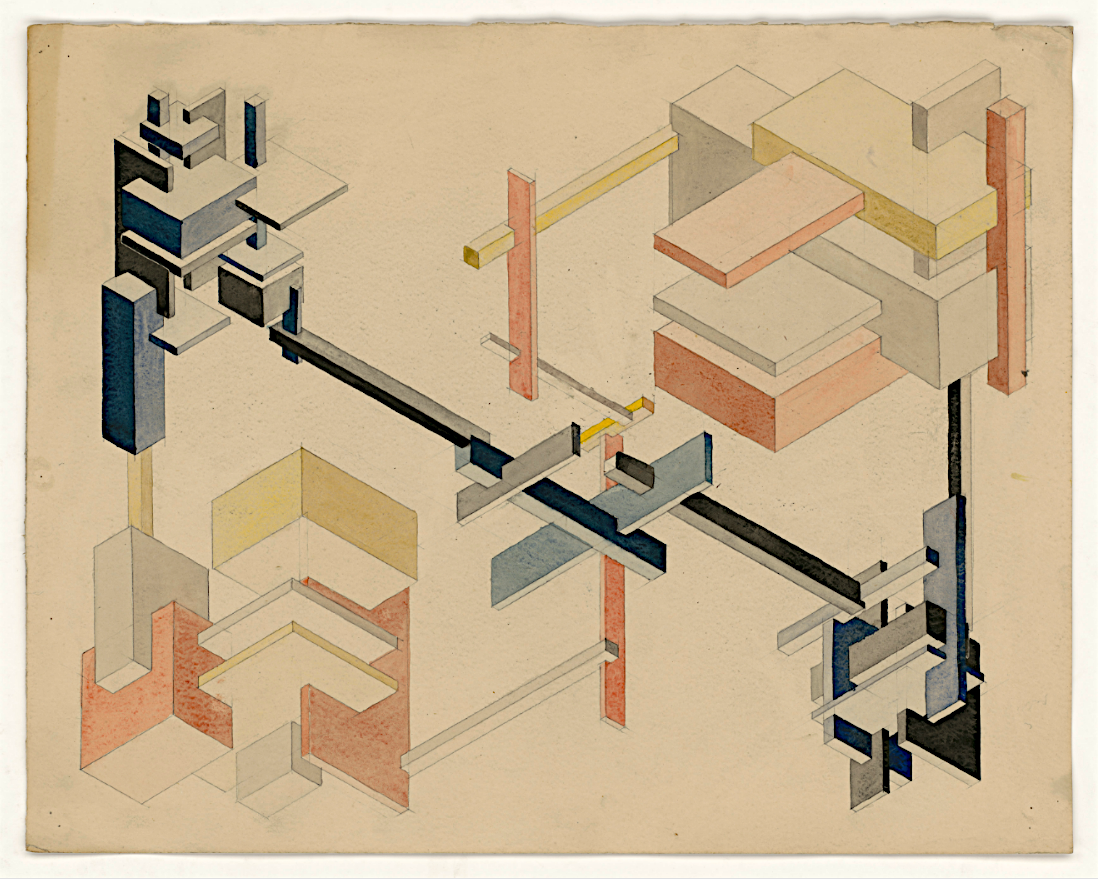
Composition of various elements (composition studies, geometric) 1932

Gerhard Marcks drew his attention to the Bauhaus in Weimar under Walter Gropius. From the winter semester of 1921/22 to 1925, Dieckmann studied there on a scholarship, initially under Johannes Itten, and at the same time completed a carpentry apprenticeship there from spring 1922. During this time, Dieckmann belonged to Walter Gropius's inner circle of students and was significantly influenced by him. In February 1924, Gropius submitted a request to the Weimar Chamber of Crafts to allow Erich Dieckmann to take his journeyman's examination early because he had been proposed as the successor to Marcel Breuer in the furniture workshop. The Chamber of Crafts then exempted Dieckmann from his third year of apprenticeship, enabling him to complete his apprenticeship on August 25, 1924, with the journeyman's examination before the Weimar Chamber of Crafts. It was only through his studies and, not least, his apprenticeship at the Bauhaus that Dieckmann found satisfaction in terms of methodology and the technical content taught.

As for other Bauhaus students, the cube or rectangular prism became the most important reference unit in applied design. Like his colleague Josef Albers, Dieckmann sought furniture forms that could be manufactured by machine. Unlike Albers and Breuer, however, Dieckmann did not want to forego the possibilities offered by traditional wood joints and an emphasis on the natural properties of wood. His favorite material combinations were oak and bird's-eye maple, oak and padauk (also known as padouk), walnut and maple, and walnut and elm.

== Haus am Horn ==
The interior design of the master bedroom and dining room in the Weimar model house "Haus Am Horn", which Georg Muche planned as a flagship project for the Bauhaus under the restrictive conditions of hyperinflation, was conceived by Dieckmann in 1923. The interior design represents Dieckmann's first independently executed work. Marcel Breuer particularly praised the simplicity of the functional construction of Dieckmann's design for the bed, which consisted solely of square blocks, and "the monumental beauty of the clarity, which fully satisfies our aesthetic demands even without inorganic decoration and ornamentation." The furniture designed by Breuer and Dieckmann was simple in form, functional, appropriate to the materials used, and suitable for industrial production.

After successfully completing his apprenticeship, Dieckmann worked as a salaried "Etatgeselle" (journeyman) in the furniture workshop at the Bauhaus. Several so-called "productive journeymen" now worked according to Dieckmann's designs, while Dieckmann himself also executed designs by third parties, such as Breuer's chair designs.

== State College of Crafts and Architecture in Weimar ==
After the Bauhaus moved to Dessau, Dieckmann remained in Weimar and ran the furniture workshop from April 1925 to March 1926 together with Reinhold Weidensee. On July 1, 1926, it was integrated into the State College of Crafts and Architecture in Weimar as the Department of Carpentry and Interior Design.^{[13]} In March 1926, Dieckmann signed his employment contract as artistic director of this department, which took effect on July 1, 1926, initially for a period of three years. In this role, he succeeded Walter Gropius and Marcel Breuer. Reinhold Weidensee continued to assist him as master craftsman. Dieckmann subsequently played a key role in establishing an exemplary testing facility for the development of standard furniture, a project that is still considered his most significant achievement today.

This furniture was based on a simple cubic form that was geared to the requirements of modern residential buildings. Bartning recommended it to building cooperatives as interior design for newly built housing estates: "The standard furniture we produced was proposed as a German industrial standard for small apartments. It is intended for modern, small-scale housing estates and does not clutter the space, but rather helps to define it." Dieckmann had been involved in developing this standard, which was based on the dimensions of the human body. The modular dimensions of 36 cm^{10} chosen by Dieckmann for his standard furniture for kitchens, dining rooms, living rooms, bedrooms, and children's rooms proved extremely successful, especially as it could be expanded, varied, and combined in many ways with additional elements. The standard furniture was high-quality, but its standardization made it inexpensive and it was also exceptional from a hygienic point of view – it avoided any dust-collecting effect.

Dieckmann worked alongside colleagues such as Ludwig Hirschfeld-Mack, Otto Lindig, Ernst Neufert, and Wilhelm Wagenfeld and was appointed professor of interior design and furniture construction. After Marcel Breuer left, he headed the furniture workshop and interior design department, developed interior designs and furniture designs for ongoing production, and made a name for himself with his own remarkable designs. Dieckmann's masterful handling of space, form, and structure had by now reached full maturity, thanks in no small part to his studies in architecture, painting, and drawing prior to his time at the Bauhaus. These were excellent qualifications for his teaching position in interior design in the architecture department. During this time, he lived with his wife at Gutenbergstraße 16 in Weimar.

== Interior design projects ==
Between 1925 and 1928, Wilhelm Wagenfeld commissioned Dieckmann to furnish his private study and bedroom. The educator Wilhelm Flitner ordered a walnut hallway from Dieckmann, while the internist Franz Volhard had his living room, bedroom, and a men's room furnished.

In 1926, Dieckmann created the interior design and furnishings of the children's home in the Freiland-Siedlung Gildenhall near Neuruppin, followed in 1930 by his furnishings for the Feodora children's home in Weimar. In doing so, he developed an educationally and psychologically motivated concept of order and color for the rooms and furniture. According to Walter Passarge, this left a "colorful and formally coherent impression" that stood "beyond the disputes and trends of the day."

Around 1926, Dieckmann became acquainted with Bauhaus patron Otto Bamberger (German merchant and entrepreneur, art collector of expressionist works, supporter of contemporary artists) and, from September 1927 to Christmas 1932, redesigned the entire interior of his Villa Sonnenhaus in Lichtenfels, Upper Franconia. This was a major commission for the Bauhaus and probably the only private building in the entire Reich that was completely furnished with Bauhaus furniture, fabrics, and lighting. Otto Bamberg's commission is therefore considered the most important and extensive of the Bauhaus. The correspondence relating to this commission has been preserved almost in its entirety.

== Participation in the Werbund exhibitions ==
In 1927, Dieckmann designed his standard furniture for a model apartment in the block designed by Mies van der Rohe in the Weissenhof Estate in Stuttgart. In the same year, Dieckmann participated with his designs in the exhibition Der Stuhl (The Chair) in Stuttgart, organized by Adolf Gustav Schneck, and designed school furniture (chairs, tables, and cabinets) for Peter Petersen's progressive university school in Jena. Petersen praised Dieckmann's furniture in his publications. In 1928, Dieckmann furnished several rooms of a model apartment designed by Otto Voelckers with standard furniture, which was shown during the exhibition Heim und Technik (Home and Technology) in Munich.^{[26]} Dieckmann was also present at the Bauen und Wohnen (Building and Living) exhibition in Berlin for the new housing estate on Fischtalgrund by Heinrich Tessenow – directly adjacent to the GEHAG housing estate "Onkel Toms Hütte" with buildings by Hugo Häring, Otto Rudolf Salvisberg, and Bruno Taut. One of his goals was to develop interior design for cooperative housing projects. Dieckmann designed the interior of the Musikheim in Frankfurt (Oder), which was initiated and directed by Georg Götsch, in 1929. For the Werkbundexhibition Wohnen und Werkraum (Living and Working Space) in Breslau in 1931, Dieckmann furnished a large hall, which was to be divided according to residential functions, with furniture samples.

In 1929, Dieckmann gave a series of lectures on the development of modern furniture at the chambers of crafts in Gera, Meiningen, and Weimar. Otto Bartning applied for Dieckmann to be awarded the academic title of professor. However, as the National Socialists were already in the process of transforming the university in the Thuringian parliament at that time, this application was not granted.

== Rise of National Socialism ==
When the NSDAP entered into a coalition in the Thuringian state government at the end of 1929, the new director of the State Building Academy in Weimar, Paul Schultze-Naumburg, dismissed the entire teaching staff, including Dieckmann, at the end of March 1930 in order to realign the academy ideologically. Democratically minded members of the teaching staff were gradually removed and replaced by National Socialist sympathizers. Otto Bartning, who withdrew from Weimar in March 1930 after his four-year contract expired, attested to Dieckmann:

"Mr Dieckmann has proven himself as a teacher in every respect, both artistically and pedagogically; many young people have emerged from his teaching with a sound professional education and well-rounded personal development. At the same time, Mr Dieckmann has helped establish the reputation of the Weimar Bauhochschul-Werkstätten (Weimar School of Architecture workshops) through his designs and adaptations of individual luxury rooms and solid, inexpensive series models, while also making a name for himself." – Otto Bartning, 31 March 1930

For Dieckmann, the rise of National Socialism meant a profoundly negative turning point in his work, as it did for the Bauhaus as a whole. He was criticized by the renowned Vossische Zeitung newspaper and by his wife Katharina, who wrote a courageous newspaper article against the tenor of an infamous introductory speech by Schultze-Naumburg.

== Halle (Saale) 1931 to 1936 ==
Dieckmann subsequently opened his own studio for furniture making and interior design in the summer of 1931 and initially worked as a freelancer, including for the company D. Bamberger in Lichtenfels, Otto Bamberger, the tubular steel factory Cebaso in Ohrdruf, the Dusco-Werke in Coburg, the Korbmacher-Verein e.G.m.b.H. in Tannroda, the Scheidemantel company in Weimar, Thonet, and the Weimar Bau- und Wohnungskunst G.m.b.H.

In 1931, Dieckmann and his wife Katharina published a remarkable illustrated book entitled Möbelbau in Holz, Rohr und Stahl (Furniture Design in Wood, Bamboo, and Steel), which featured many of his designs. The book was republished in 1990 by the Vitra Design Museum. This remarkable didactic work describes and illustrates the entire process of creating a design, from the initial idea to the practical result. It makes the basic principles of construction and the logic of design transparent. The explanations of the constituent elements, materials, and working techniques allow even interested laypeople to understand them mentally.^{[5]} Art historian Justus Bier, who reviewed the illustrated book, praised the "aesthetic geometry" of Dieckmann's work, which enabled him to create "calm, functional furniture that demonstrates a healthy connection to the tradition of craftsmanship and clear, fundamental considerations about the function of contemporary furniture and modern manufacturing methods."

Life warmth and truth can only be found where human nature comes into its own. Let's not forget that when it comes to our homes. Let's allow our modern homes to have a human touch. Something that isn't overly sophisticated, something temporary...

— Erich Dieckmann, Die Kunst,

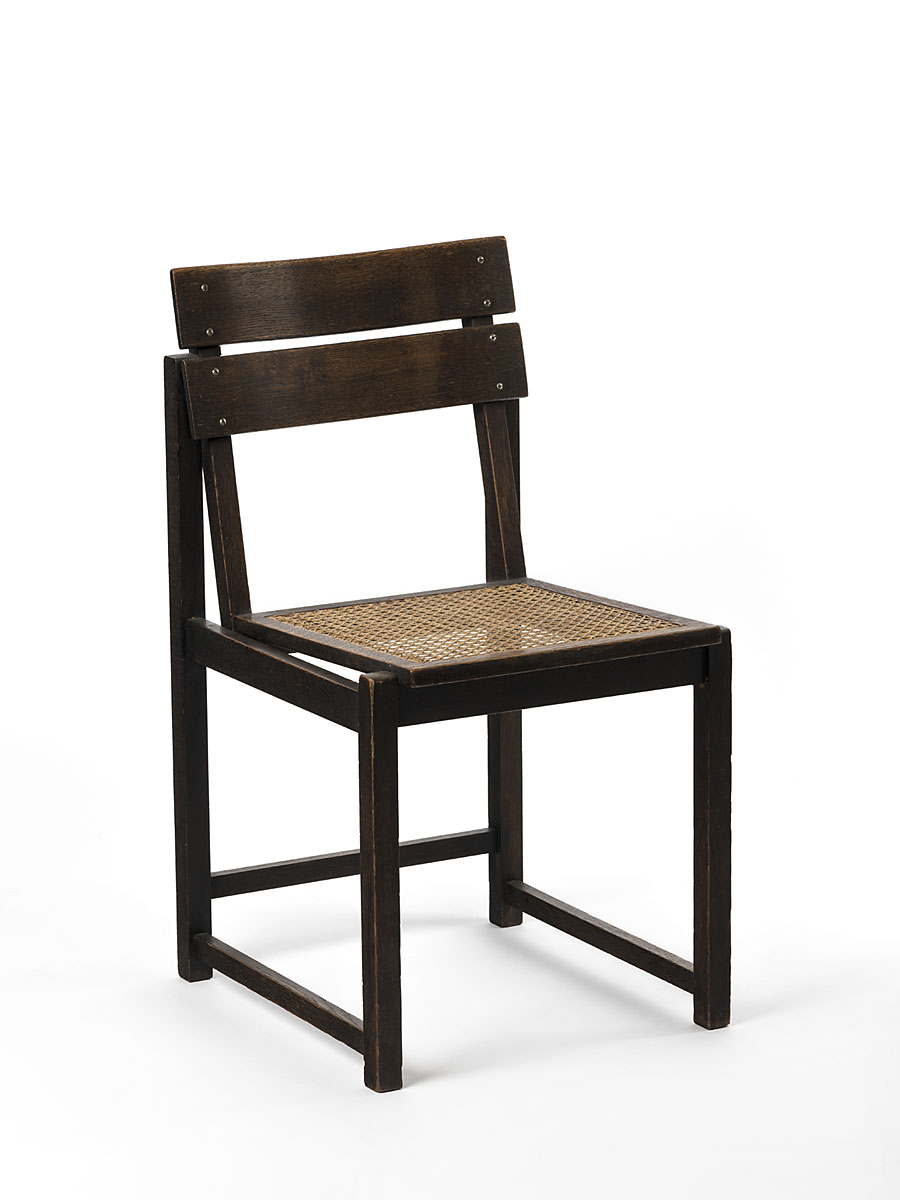
Chair with split backrest 1926

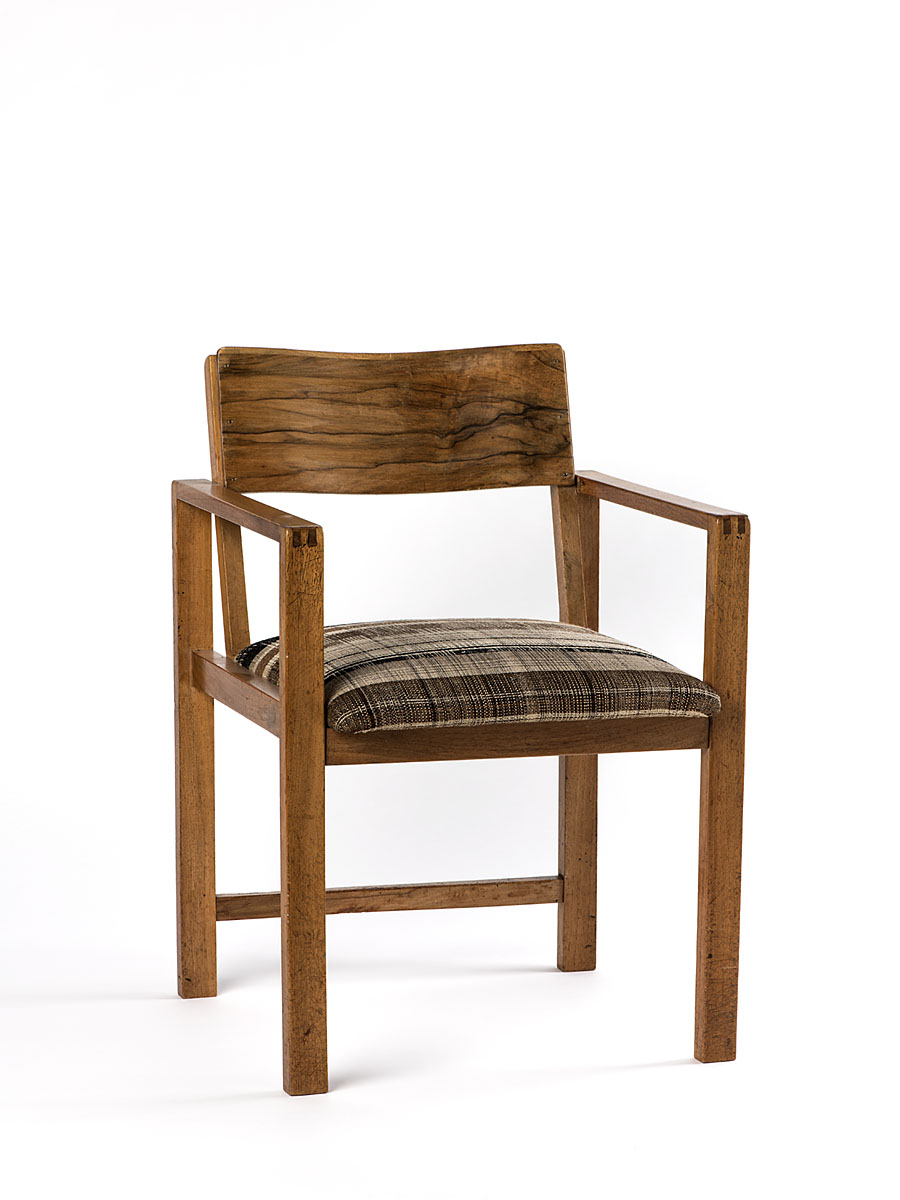
Armchair with one-piece backrest upholstered 1928

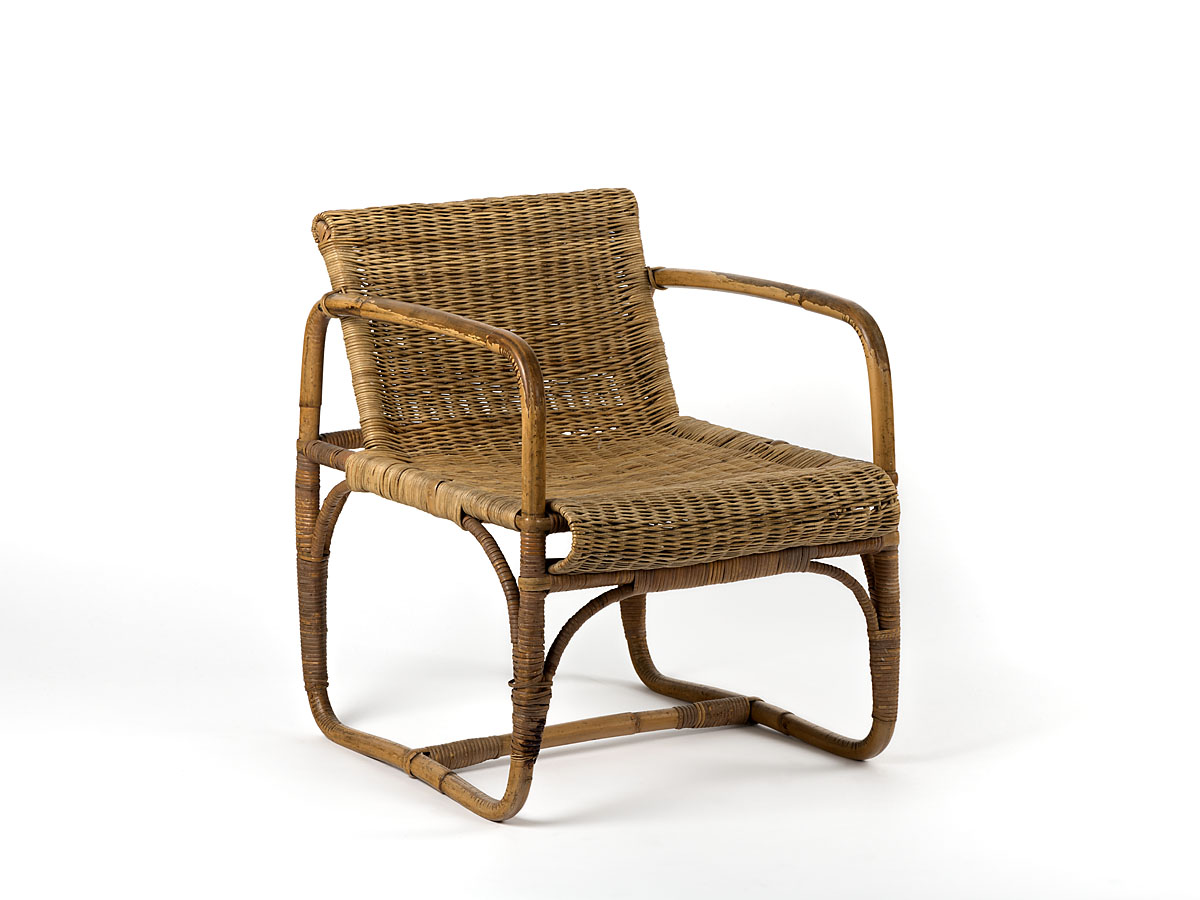
Wicker chair (model 1) 1930

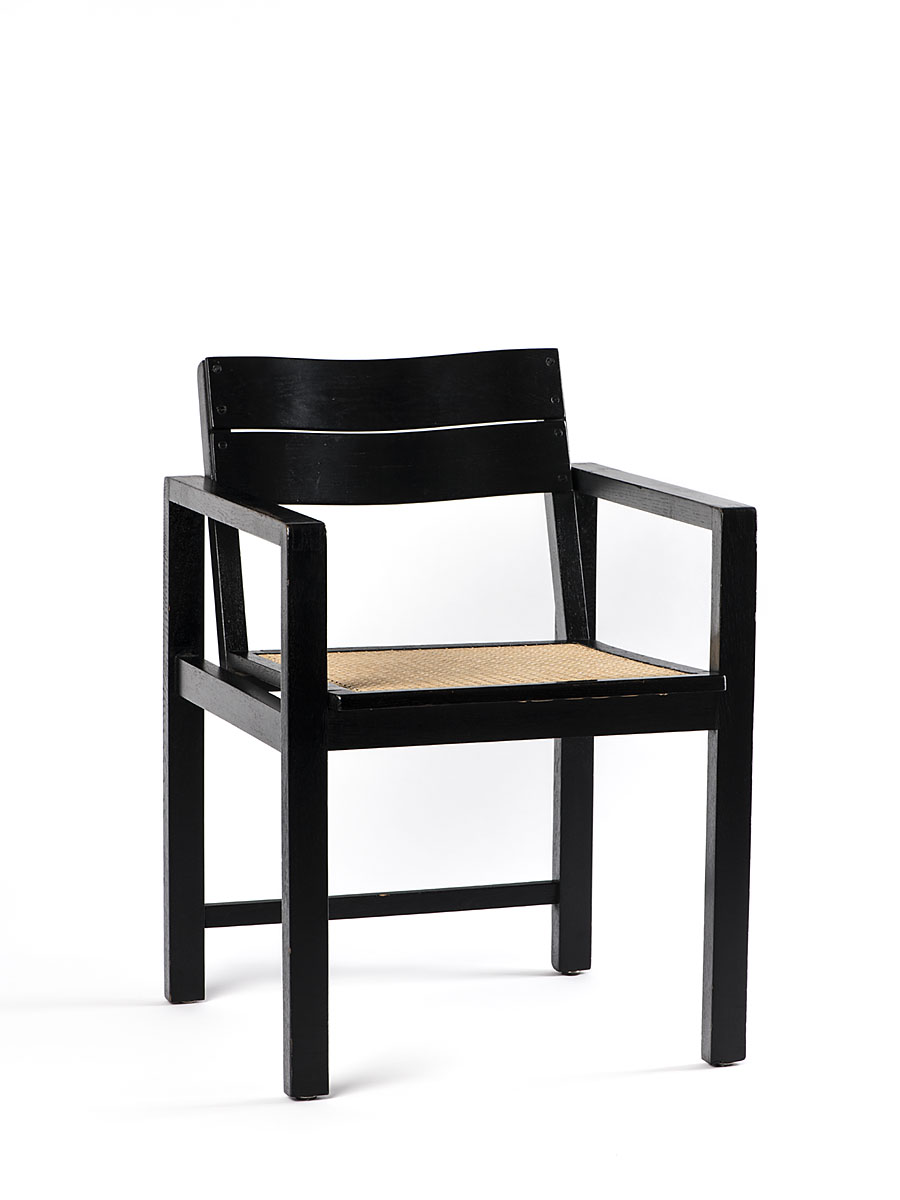
Armchair with split backrest 1926

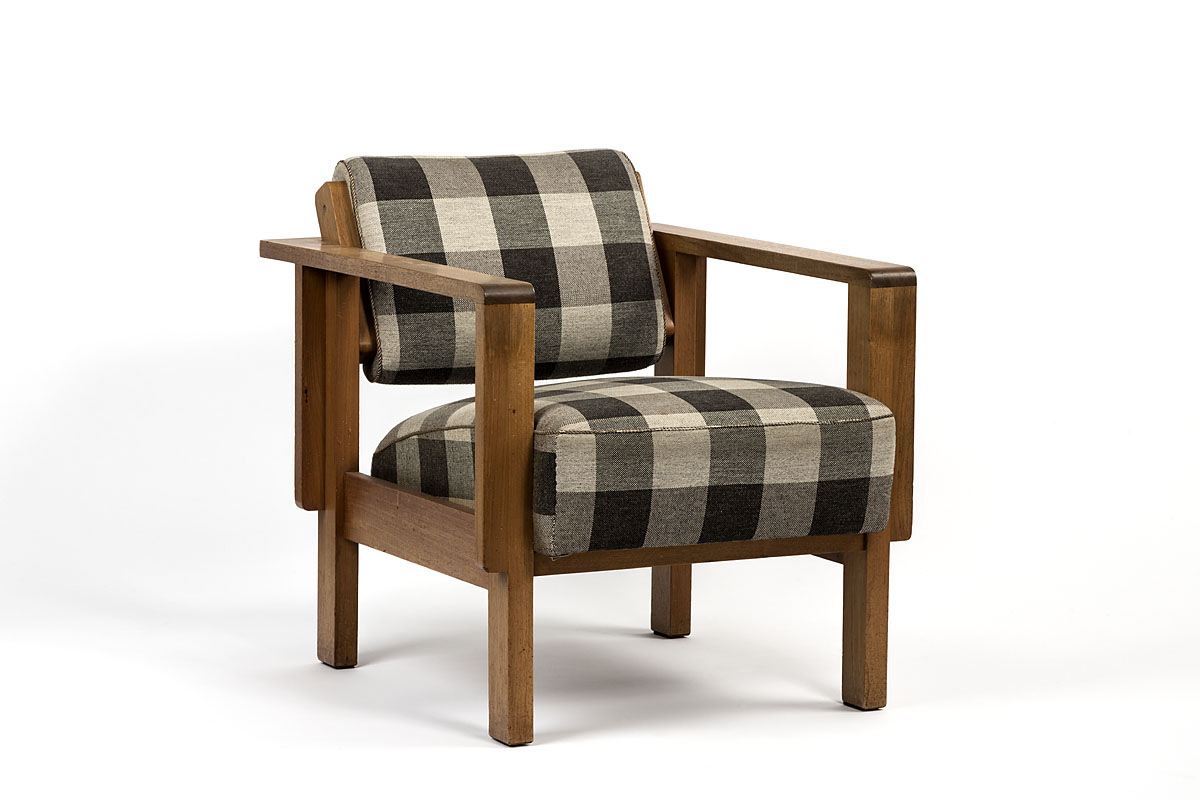
Light club chair 1926

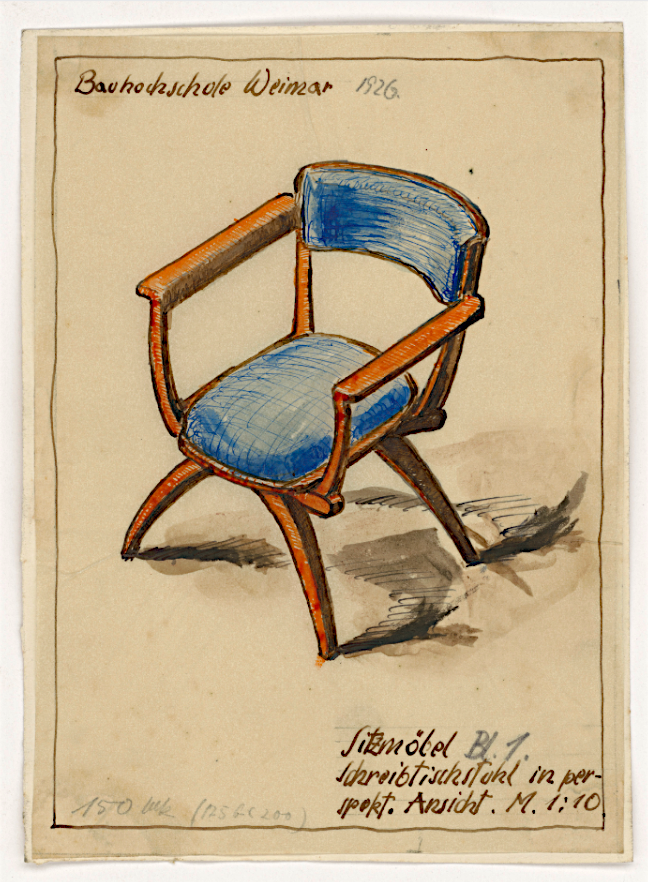
Desk chair, perspective view (Furniture designs, seating furniture) 1926

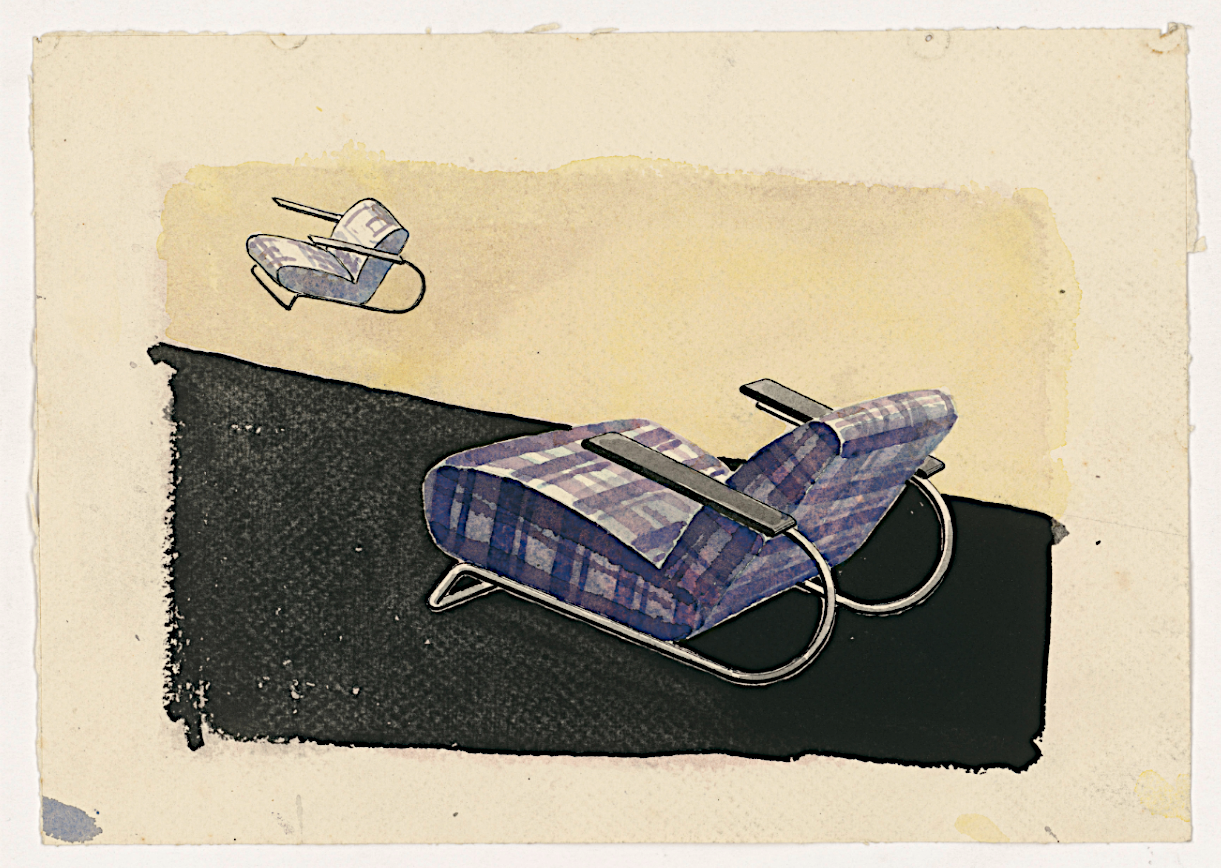
Armchairs (furniture designs, tubular steel furniture) 1925–1935

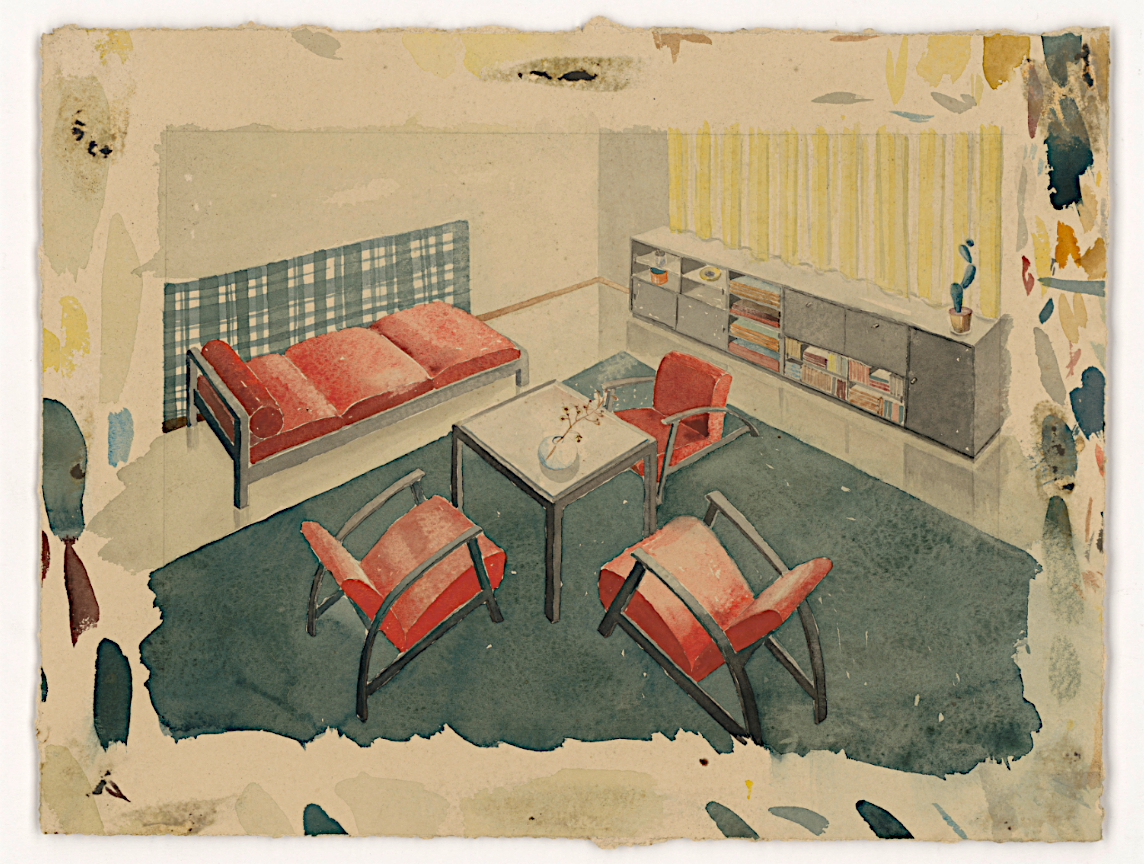
Sitting area with divan (furniture designs, living rooms)

== Teaching at Burg Giebichenstein ==
From May 4, 1931, Dieckmann spent two and a half years as artistic director of the carpentry workshop at the Workshops of the City of Halle (Saale), the Burg Giebichenstein University of Art and Design, under Gerhard Marcks. His application, submitted in 1925 to Paul Thiersch, had been rejected at the time because a master's examination was required as a teaching qualification. Now, however, he was asked to submit his application documents directly. In 1932, he was commissioned to redesign the lecture hall of the medical clinic in Halle (Saale) with rows of chairs and lecterns made of tubular steel and wood.

The character of the chair is most clearly visible from the side view [...]. The front view provides no clues. So the following statement applies: The character of the chair is determined by its profile.

— Erich Dieckmann, Die Korbmöbel Erich Dieckmanns,

== Phase of unemployment 1933 to 1936 ==
The seizure of power by the National Socialists at the end of January 1933 brought Dieckmann's creative work to an end. Since 1920, ethnic nationalist forces in Weimar had been opposing the Bauhaus, initially with a smear campaign intensified by a local press that was not well disposed toward the Bauhaus.

When the Bauhaus was forced to close in 1933, Dieckmann was granted "ownership rights to the form" for 26 furniture designs.

His designs were initially often geometric, with almost square square or flat pieces of wood. In some cases, the armrests were connected to the chair legs and designed as a sled base. He predominantly used high-quality woods such as beech, oak, ash, and cherry, as well as rattan, rattan, and wickerweaving to soften the sometimes austere geometry. The natural materials were supplied by the Lichtenfels and Coburg-based company D. Bamberger. Like his colleague Breuer, he also worked with tubular steel. Today, his seating furniture designs in particular fetch top prices. By standardizing and normalizing his furniture, he wanted to ensure that the individual pieces remained as affordable as possible.

Along with Marcel Breuer, Erich Dieckmann is one of the most creative and productive carpenters of the Bauhaus and one of its most important furniture designers. Dieckmann's designs mark an important phase of renewal in furniture construction. He is credited with having made a significant contribution to the modern history of design that was written at the Bauhaus.

Dieckmann's furniture was among the finest and most artistically pure that the market had to offer in modern interior design.

— Justus Bier,

In view of the negative influence on his work that Dieckmann had been feeling for years, he joined the NSDAP on May 1, 1933 (membership number 1,880,935). He hoped that this step would secure his professional career and thus also his family. Instead, he was dismissed again on August 31 by the mayor of Halle, Johannes Weidemann (NSDAP), and the carpentry department of the School of Arts and Crafts was dissolved, officially due to cost-cutting measures, but in reality for cultural-political and ideological reasons. According to a written assessment by the then governor of the province of Saxony, this dismissal was unlawful because the notice period had not been observed and it also constituted a violation of the Severely Disabled Persons Act. Dieckmann's Bauhaus past worked against him.

His family's livelihood was now at stake. In June 1933, he appealed in vain to Bernhard Rust, Hermann Göring, and Joseph Goebbels, and his wife later appealed directly to Adolf Hitler. As a result, despite a lavishly illustrated résumé with numerous drawings accompanying his many applications throughout the Reich, Erich Dieckmann was unable to find any work or teaching position for about three years. However, his resume also contained clear moral criticism of the conditions in the Third Reich, which officially honored war invalids like him but at the same time forced them out of their professions in violation of the law and left them and their families in poverty. In 1934, he was awarded the Cross of Honor for Frontline Soldiers. At times, he and his family lived in extreme poverty, surviving on only 12 Reichsmark a week in unemployment benefits. The odd jobs Dieckmann took on did little to improve the situation. When he lost his apartment at Seebener Straße 190/III in Halle (the building still exists) in April 1934, his young children and their mother had to be separated and housed with relatives and acquaintances. He occasionally received commissions for designs, such as in 1934/35 from the shoe manufacturer Hans Ott in Burgkunstadt, Upper Franconia, for a meeting room in the company and for its private furnishings with carpet designs by Dieckmann. He also received some individual commissions from wicker furniture manufacturers.

== Hanover 1936 to 1938 ==
From July 1936, Dieckmann was employed as a clerk for industrial design at the Amt Schönheit der Arbeit (Office for the Beauty of Work) in Hanover, possibly through a private contact with Hermann Gretsch. This permanent position enabled his family to be reunited and they lived at Lönsstraße 16 in Hanover.

== Berlin 1938 to 1944 ==
In 1938, he moved with his family to Berlin, where he lived at Brauner Weg 28 (now Singerstraße) in the Friedrichshain district. He ran a carpentry workshop at the adjacent Andreasstraße 11 (the buildings at both addresses no longer exist), an indication that his purely administrative work was by no means satisfying for him.^{[44]} From 1939, he worked as a consultant for German arts and crafts at the Reich Chamber of Fine Arts, and a return to design was no longer possible for him.

Dieckmann died shortly after his 48th birthday of a heart attack, which was attributed to overexertion during Allied air raids on Berlin.

Dieckmann's family remained in contact with Otto Bamberger's family, who had emigrated during the Nazi era, even after the Second World War. His daughter Anna Bettina worked briefly as an au pair for Otto Bamberger's son Klaus Philipp Bamberger in the US state of New Jersey and married in the United States.

== Artistic representation ==
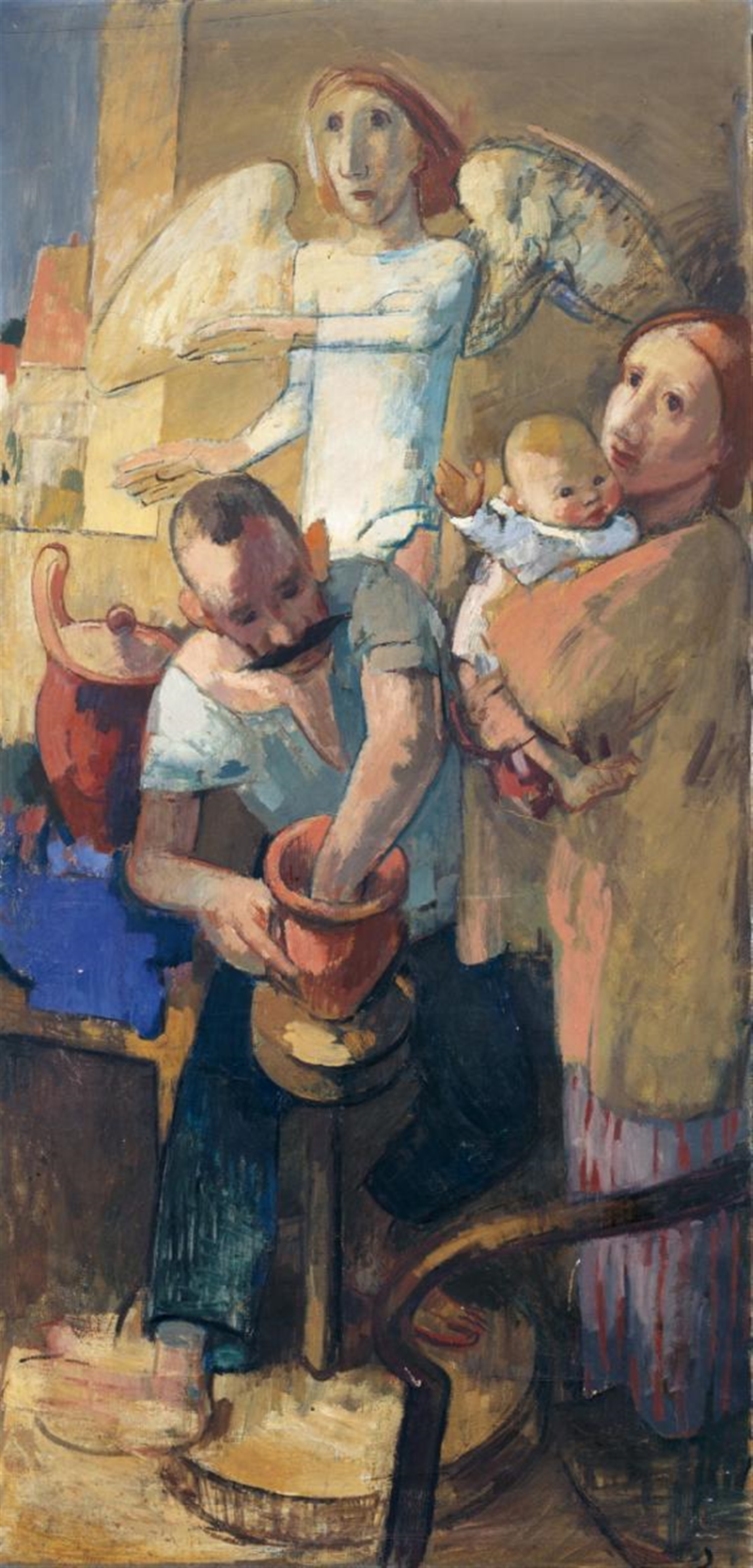
Dieckmann symbolically depicted as a potter (meaning: material and form designer), painting by Johannes Driesch, 1929

The Christian-inspired painting Der Töpfer und sein Schutzengel (The Potter and His Guardian Angel) by Bauhaus talent Johannes Driesch from 1929 depicts Erich Dieckmann symbolically as a potter (material and form designer). Noteworthy is Dieckmann's severely war-wounded left arm, which is placed in the center of the picture and thus in the focus, and is depicted as an actively shaping and forming arm. The guardian angel depicted is likely to refer to this serious injury, indicating that Dieckmann narrowly survived the war.

During his time at the Bauhaus between 1927 and 1929, Erich Dieckmann designed bedroom furniture for Johannes Driesch's private apartment, consisting of a three-door wardrobe with a mirror on the inside, two single beds with high headboards and footboards, two bedside tables, and a chest of drawers made of cherry wood. Some of this furniture is depicted in Dieckmann's book published in 1931 and has been preserved to this day.

== Erich Dieckmann as a Painter and Commercial Artist (Selection) ==
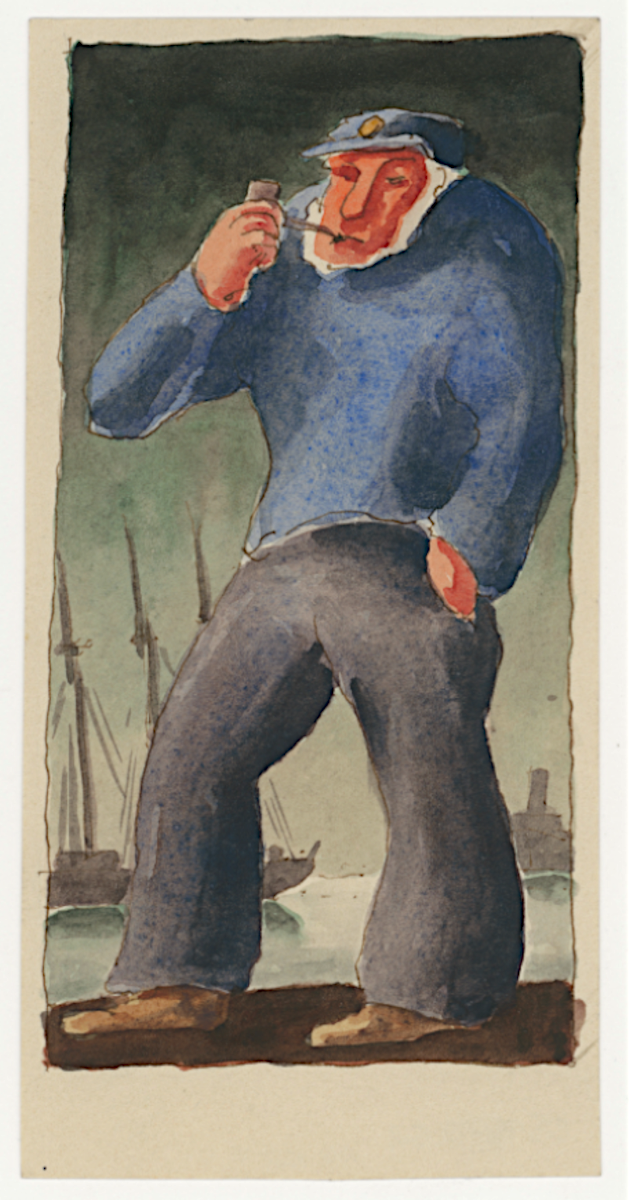
Ink drawing of Fishermen at the Harbor

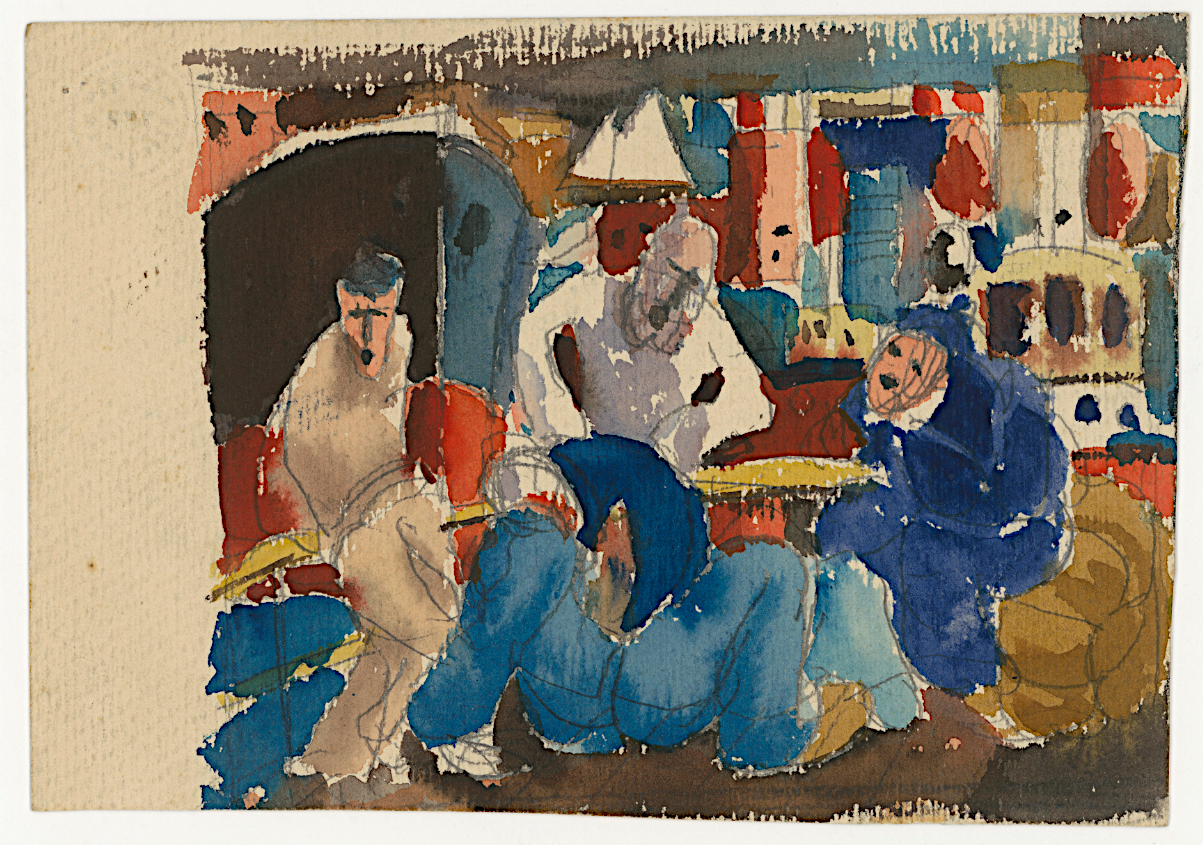
Ink drawing of Fishermen

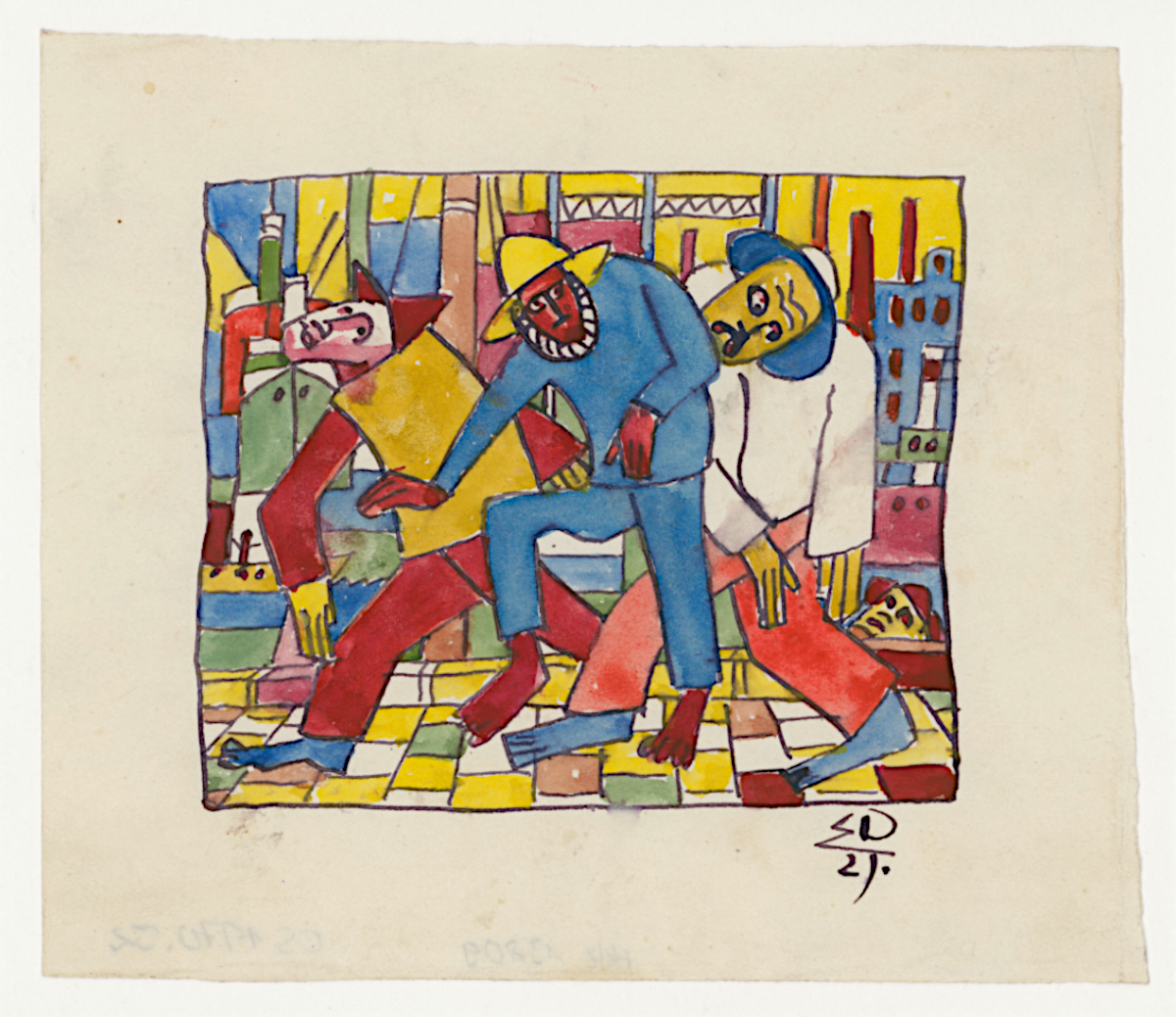
Ink drawing of Three Fishermen

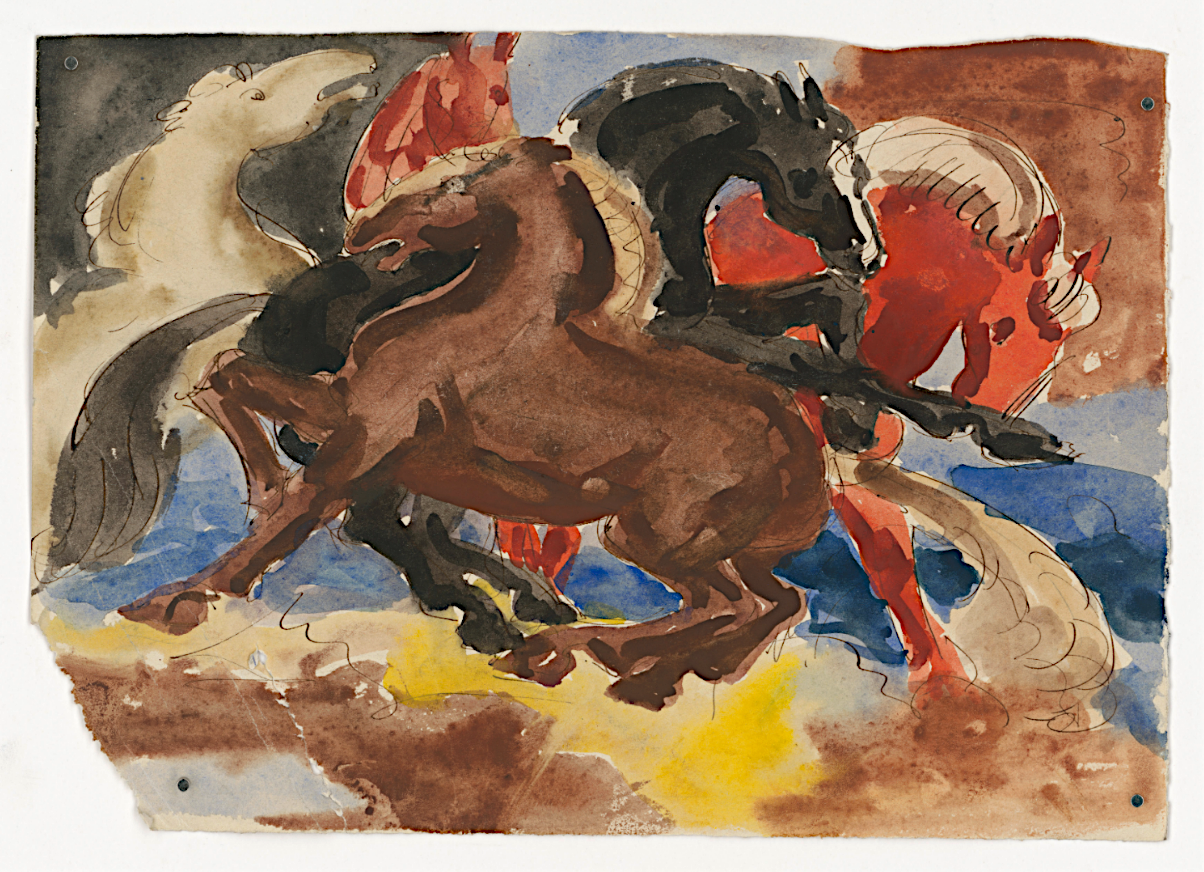
Ink drawing of Horses

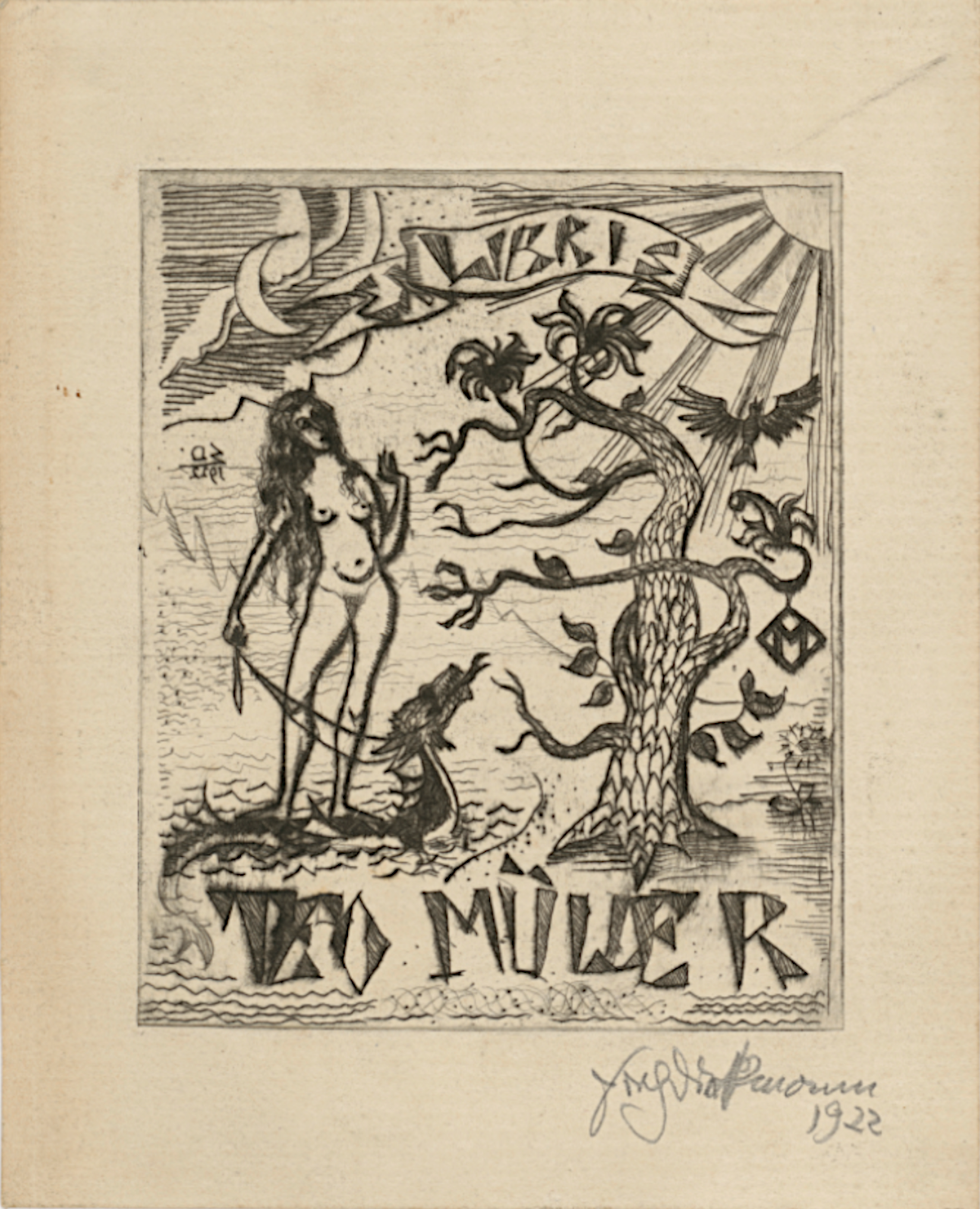
Graphic Ex Libris Theo Müller

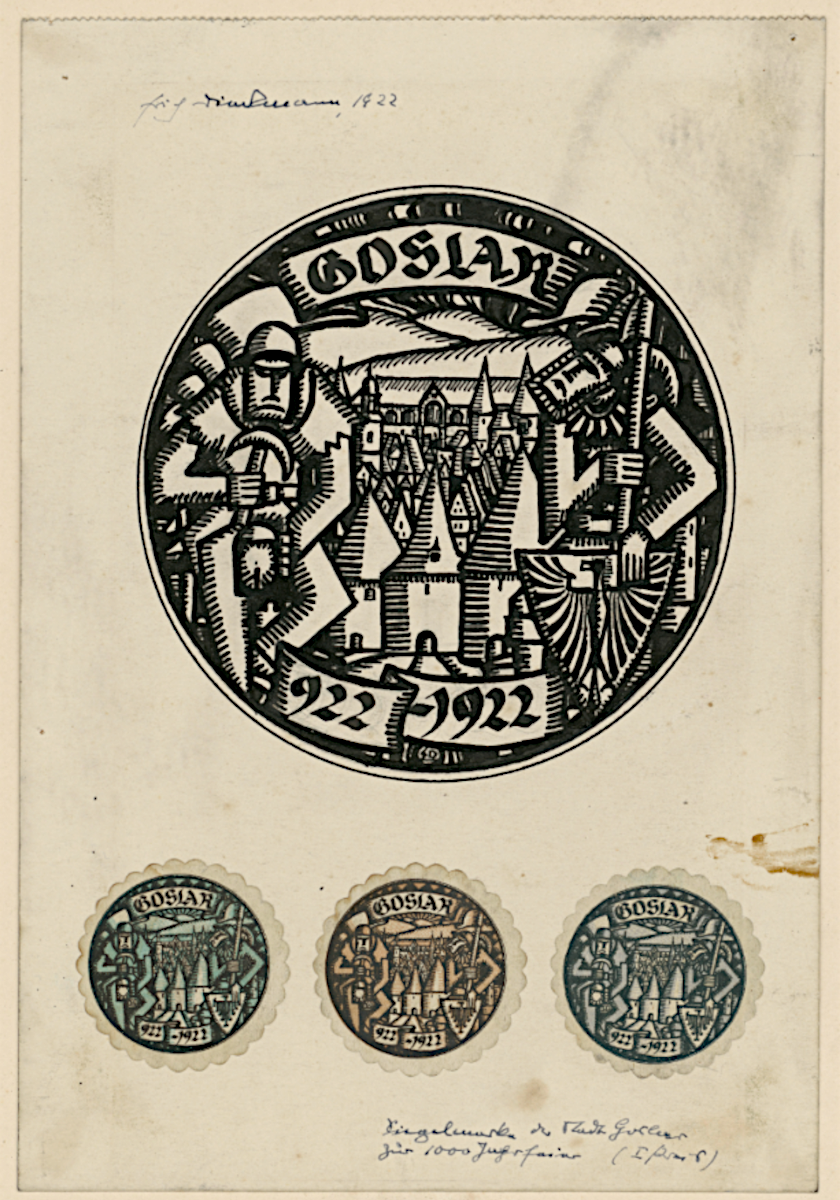
Graphic Seal 1000 Years of the City Goslar, design and colored stamps

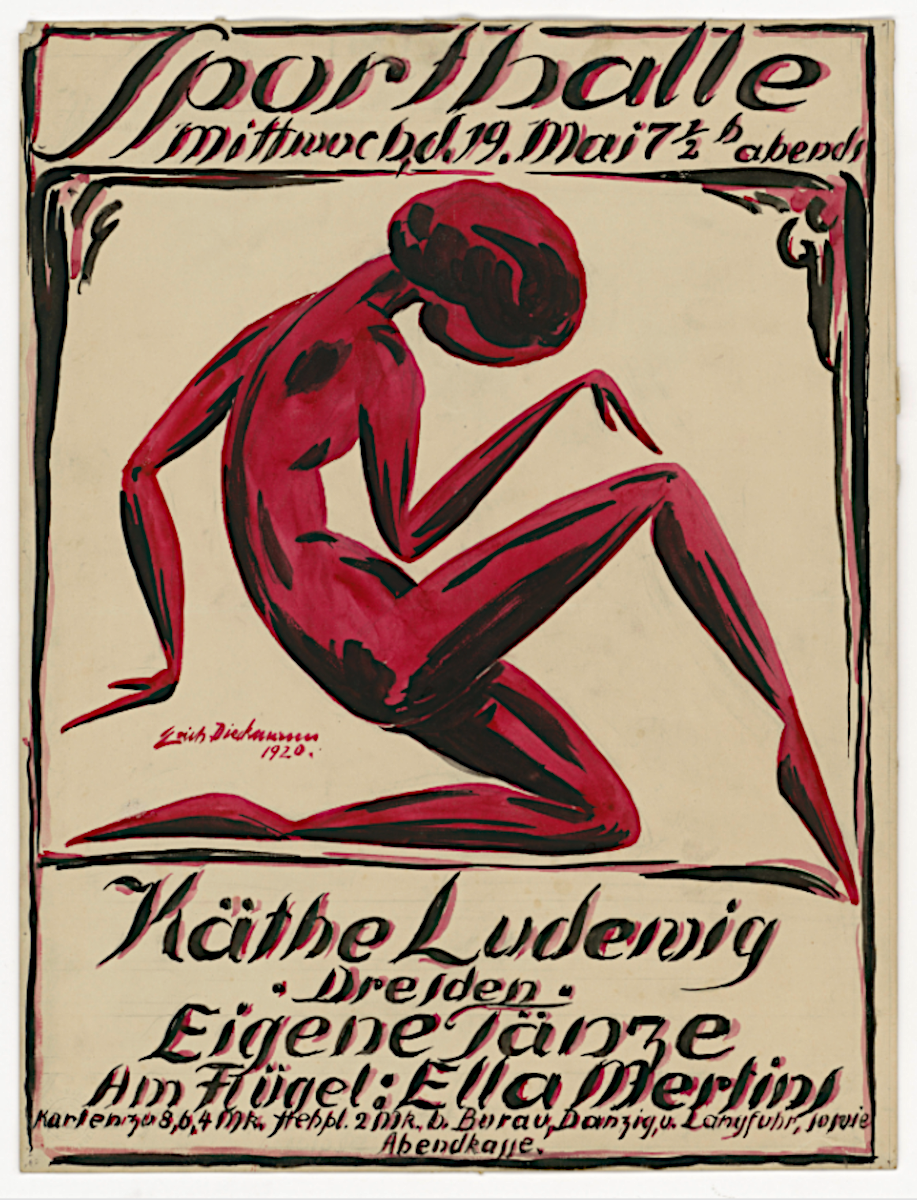
Graphic design for "Käthe Ludewig. Her Own Dances" 1920

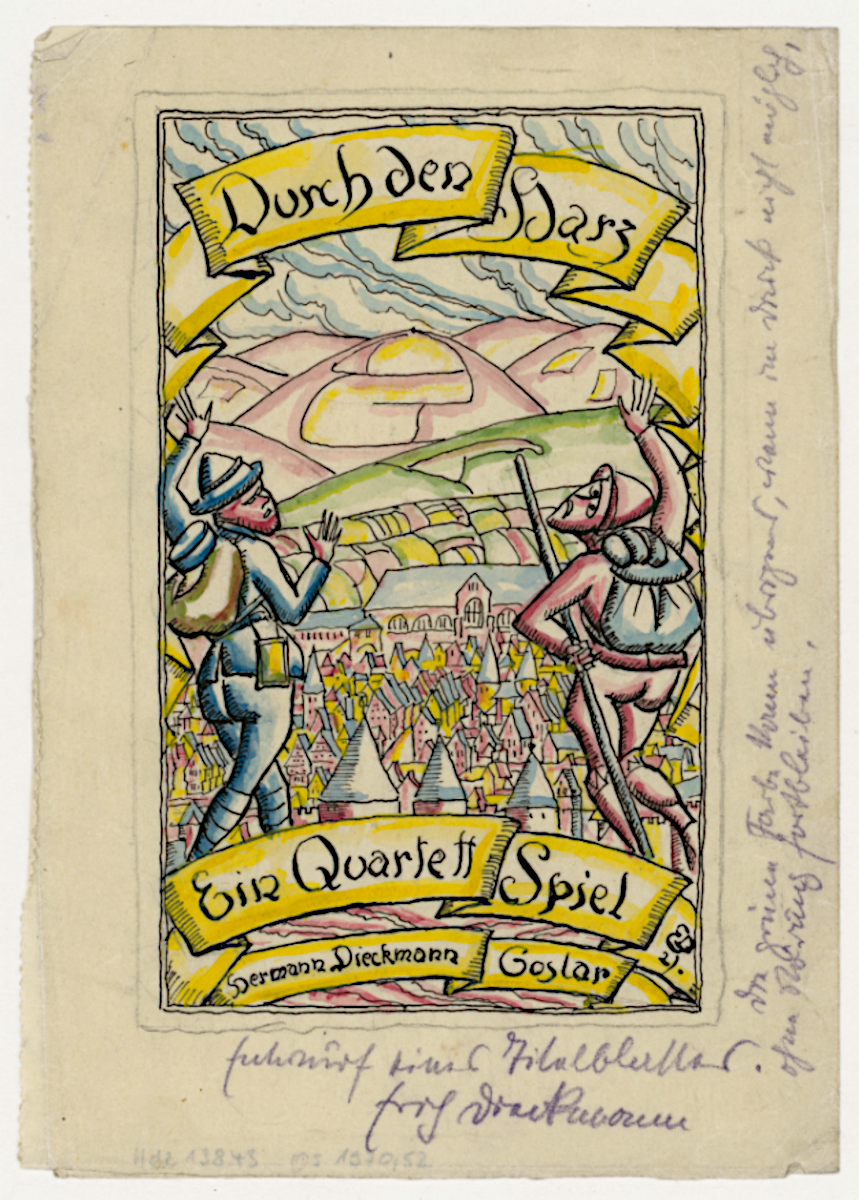
Graphic title page for "Quartet Game Through the Harz Mountains" 1921

== Buildings as an architect in Kleinmachnow and Berlin-Reinickendorf ==
- 1931 Karl-August Götze House, Driftkamp 14.
  - Note: During work on the Götze House, he likely came into contact with the architect Curt Koenert, who, like Dieckmann, had studied architecture at the Technical University of Gdansk. Koenert worked as a freelance architect in Kleinmachnow from 1932 onwards. It is unknown whether there was a connection between them and requires biographical verification.
- Between 1934 and 1935, Erich Dieckmann is listed as the architect of the cemetery chapel at the Kleinmachnow Forest Cemetery and is a living testament to his diverse skills. This building is considered a remarkable example of 1930s architecture in the state of Brandenburg and was listed as a historic monument in 2009.
- 1936/37 Berlin-Reinickendorf settlement Paddenpuhl second building section (Housing estate built in the expressionist style in the 1920s and 1930s in the Berlin district of Reinickendorf], collaboration with the architects Fritz Beyer, Josef Scherer and the landscape and garden planner Erwin Barth
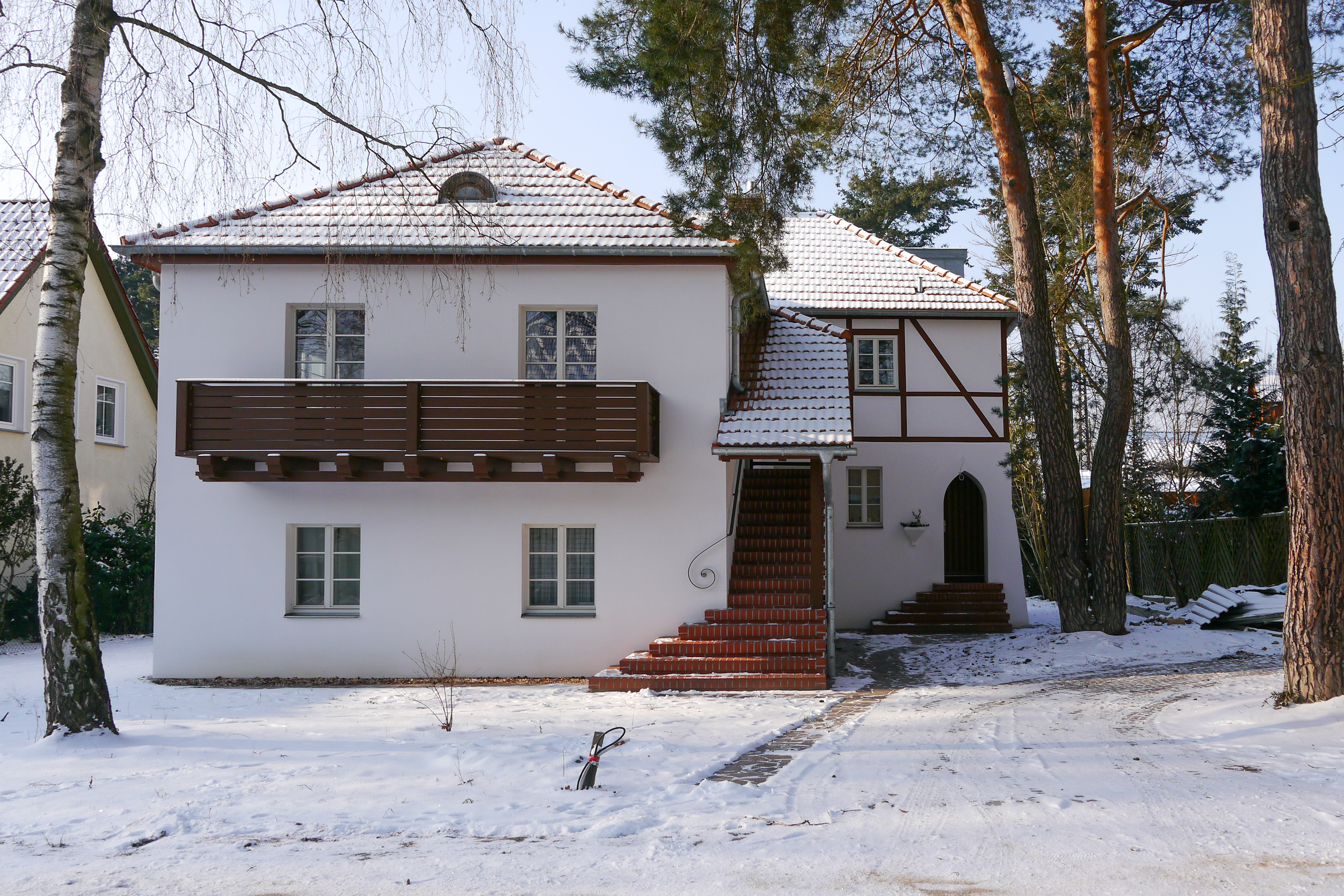
Götze residential building Driftkamp 14

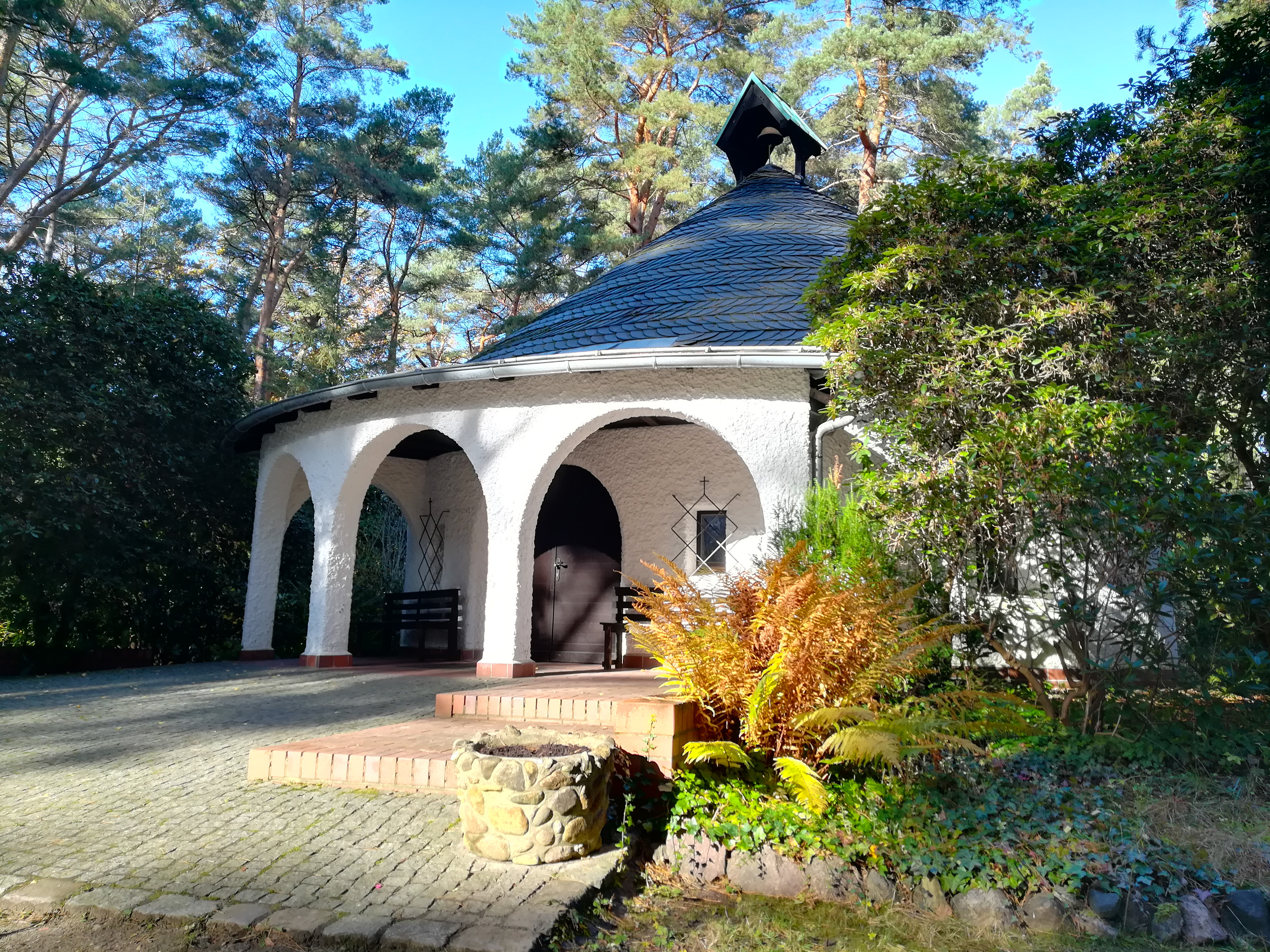
Chapel Waldfriedhof Kleinmachnow, around 1934, architect Erich Dieckmann

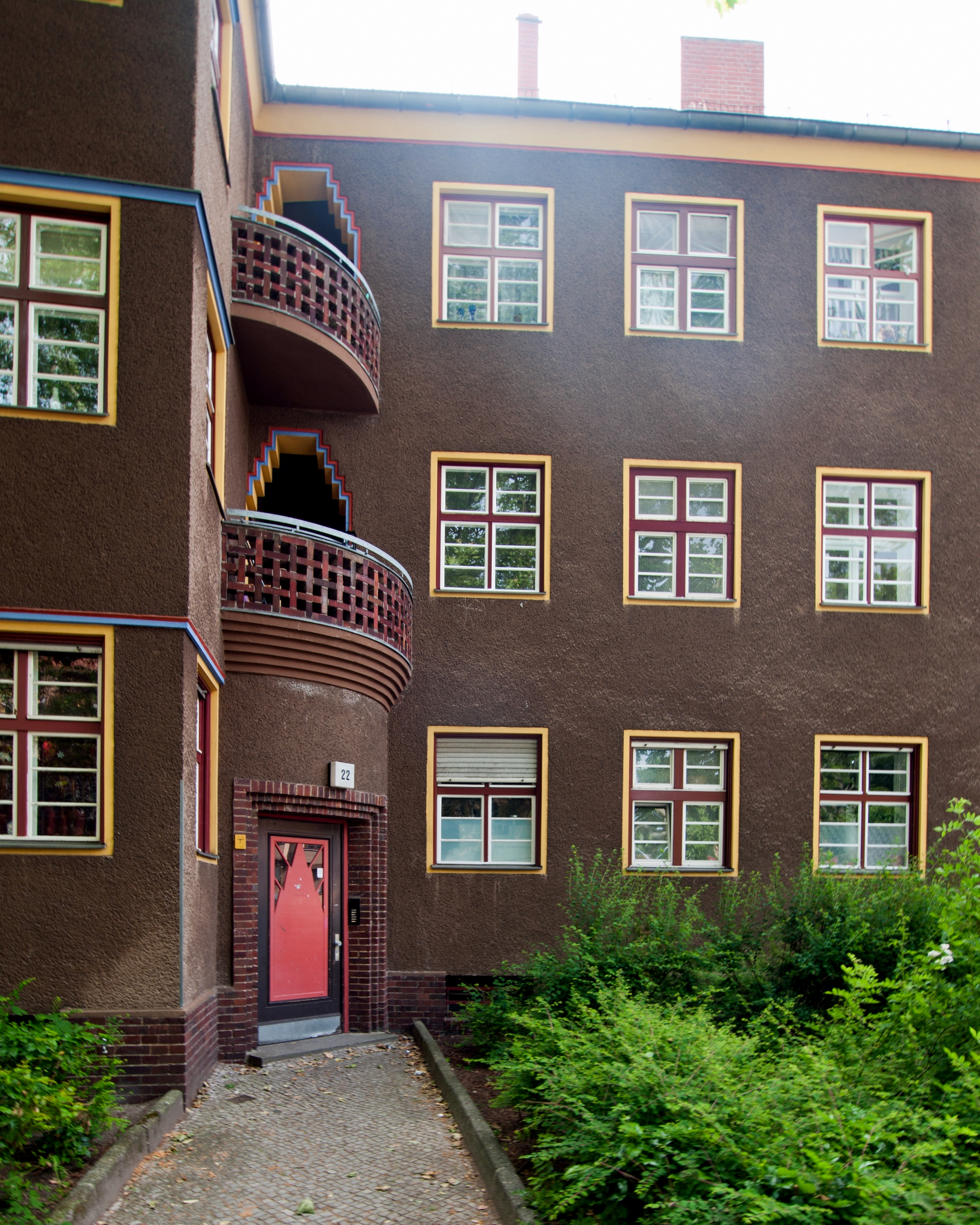
Buildings of the Paddenpuhl settlement at the Breitkopfbecken

== Family ==
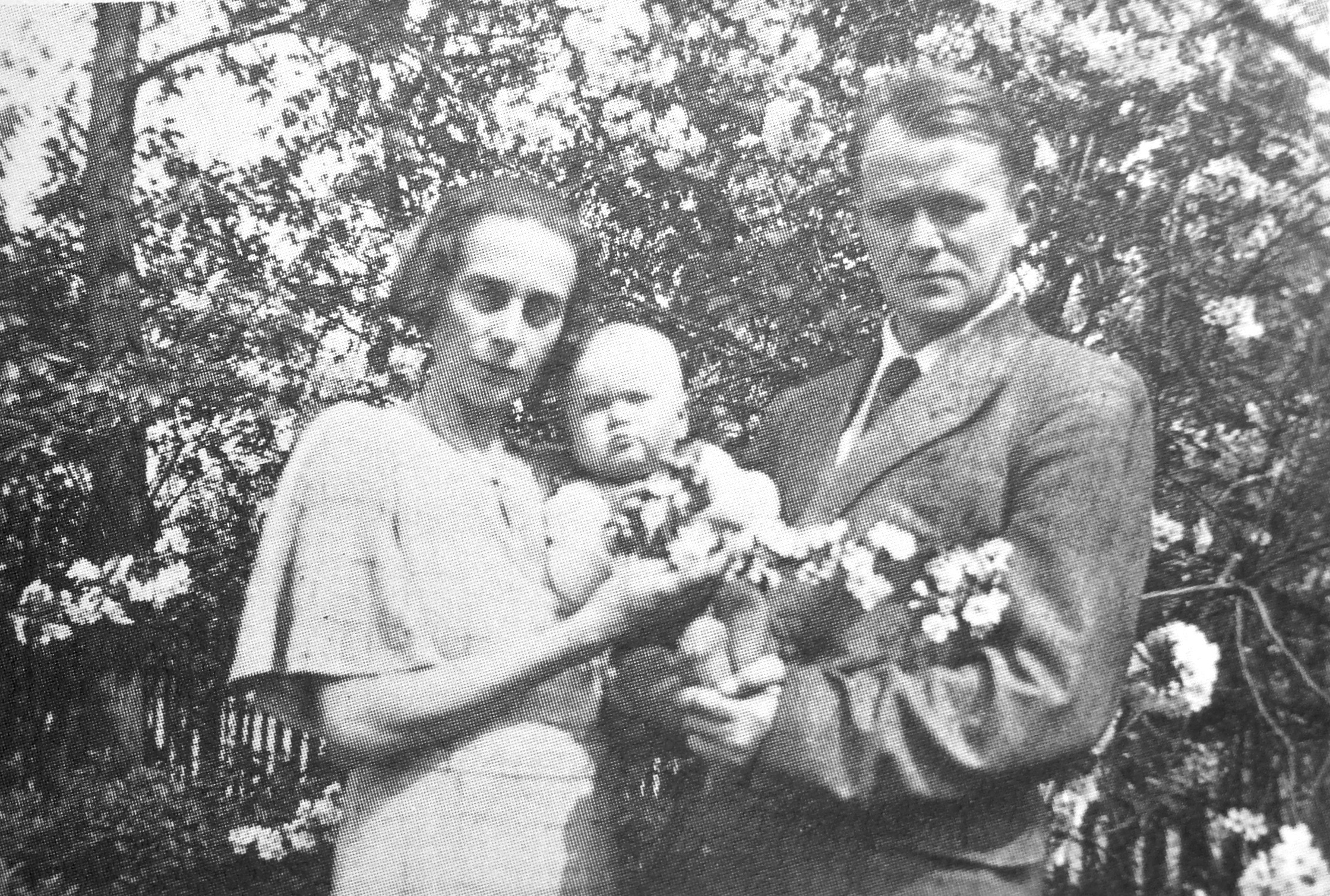
Katharina and Erich Dieckmann with baby, ca. 1935

Erich Dieckmann was born as the third child and third son of Royal Prussian Landjägermeister Hermann Dieckmann (1859–1924) and grew up in Lower Saxony. He had two older brothers and three younger siblings, including two more brothers and a sister.

His marriage to Katharina, née Ludewig, in 1921 produced four children by 1935, including daughter Anna Bettina (later married to Sons) and son Markus. Katharina Ludewig was a student of dance teacher Mary Wigman and a Bauhaus student.

== Publications (in German) ==
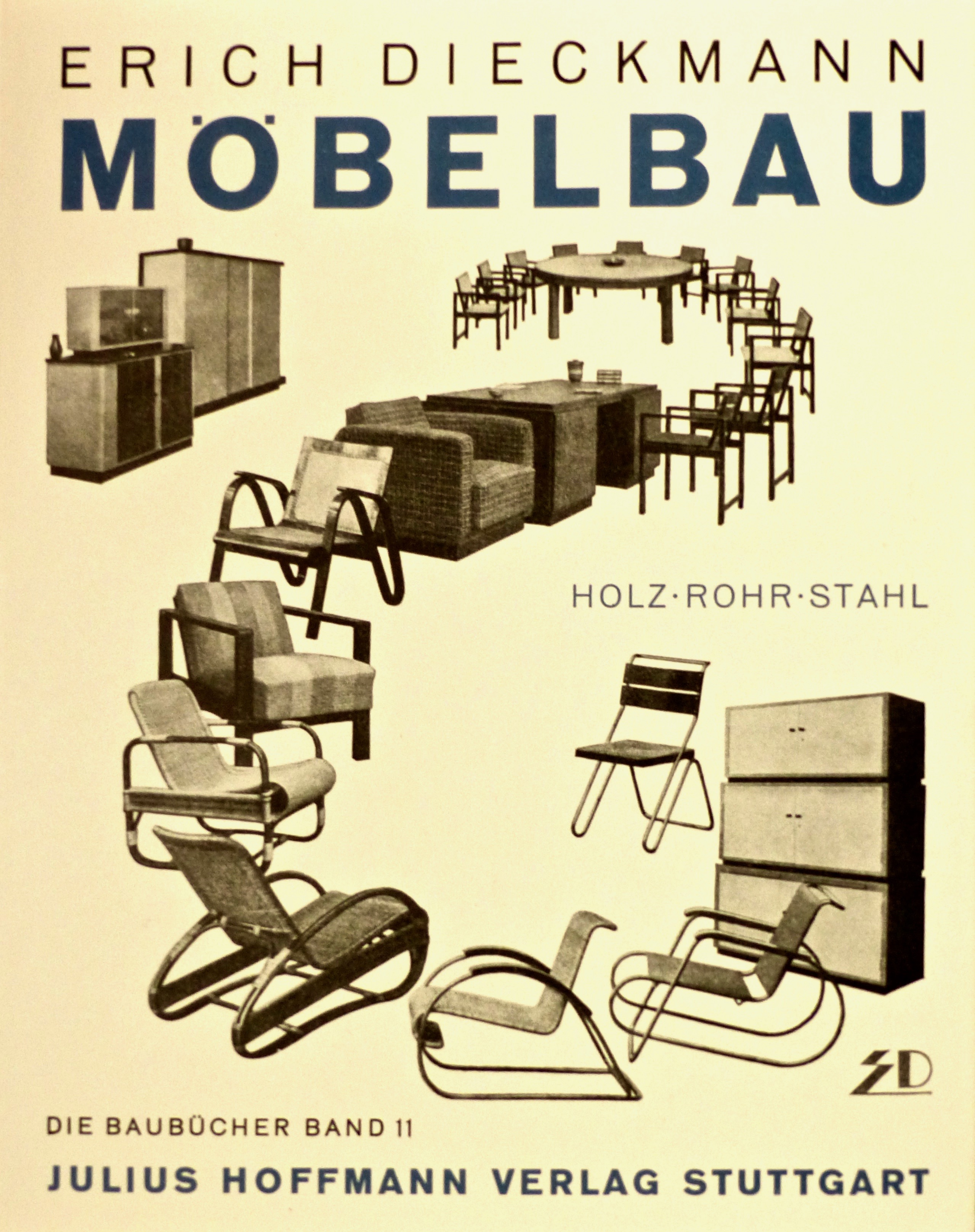
Erich Dieckmann: Furniture Construction – Wood, Pipe, Steel, 1931

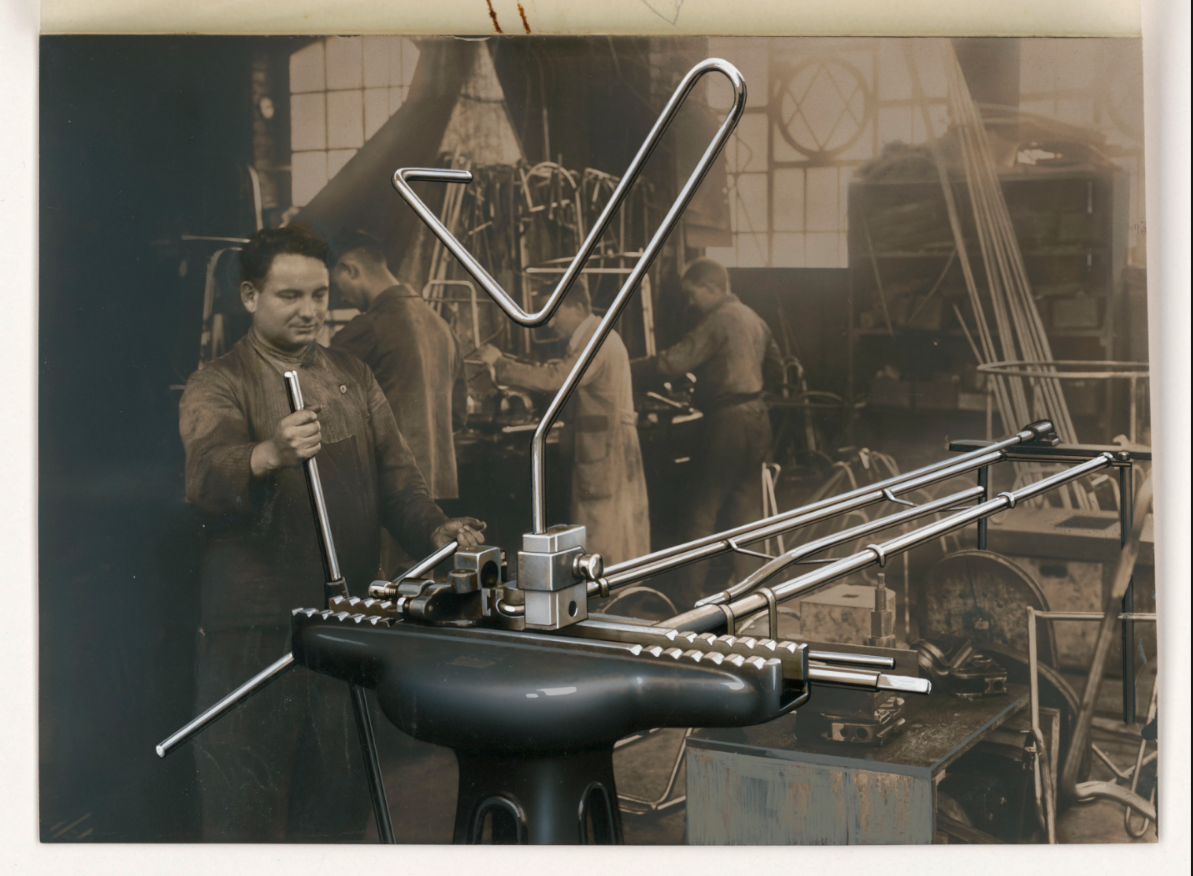
Production of tubular steel furniture here Möbelbau, Stuttgart 1931

- Möbel. 1. Arbeiten von Erich Dieckmann, Fachlehrer für Innenausbau und Möbel an der Staatlichen Bauhochschule Weimar. In: Stein, Holz und Eisen. Halbmonatsschrift für neue Bauwirtschaft und Baugestaltung, 41 (1927), S. 1069–1072.
- Zu den Arbeiten der Staatlichen Bauhochschule für Handwerk und Baukunst Weimar. In: Die Baugilde. Baukunst, Bauwirtschaft, Bautechnik, 9. Jg. 1927, S. 1426f.
- mit Katharina Dieckmann (Bearb.): Möbelbau – Holz Rohr Stahl (= Die Baubücher, Band 11), Julius Hoffmann Verlag, Stuttgart 1931. Neuauflage: Vitra Design Museum, Weil am Rhein 1990. ISBN 3-9802539-2-9.
- Geschichte eines Schwerkriegsbeschädigten, 14 Seiten handschriftlich mit 13 eigenhändigen und großteils signierten Zeichnungen, Halle (Saale) 1934 [Illustrierter Lebenslauf zu Bewerbungsschreiben während der Arbeitslosigkeit von 1933 bis 1936].

== Literature (in German) ==
- Staatliches Bauhaus Weimar, Karl Nierendorf (Hrsg.): Staatliches Bauhaus Weimar 1919–1923. Bauhausverlag, Weimar/München 1923. OCLC 905455176 Reprint: Kraus, München 1980. ISBN 3-601-00282-5.
- Walter Gropius: Neue Arbeiten der Bauhauswerkstätten (= Bauhausbücher, Bd. 7). A. Langen, München 1925. OCLC 251325788
- Adolf Meyer: Ein Versuchshaus des Bauhauses Weimar (= Bauhausbücher, Bd. 3). A. Langen, München 1925. OCLC 741968634 Reprint: Bauhaus-Universität Weimar (Hrsg.), Weimar 2000. ISBN 978-3-86068-079-7.
- Staatliche Hochschule für Handwerk und Baukunst (Hrsg.), Otto Bartning, Ernst Neufert: Staatliche Bauhochschule Weimar. Aufbau und Ziel. Informationsbroschüre, Weimar 1927. OCLC 632977945
- Die kleine Wohnung in der Ausstellung Heim und Technik München 1928. 21 Wohnungen in Grundrissen, Vogelschaubildern und Erläuterungen. Einführung von Prof. Otho Orlando Kurz. Verlag Georg D. W. Callwey, München 1928. OCLC 250402967
- Werner Graeff: Innenräume. Räume und Inneneinrichtungsgegenstände aus der Werkbundausstellung Die Wohnung, insbesondere aus den Bauten der städtischen Weißenhofsiedlung in Stuttgart, hrsg. im Auftrag des Deutschen Werkbundes. Akademischer Verlag Dr. Fr. Wedekind & Co., Stuttgart 1928. OCLC 886866124
- Möbel der Staatlichen Bauhochschule Weimar. Verkaufskatalog. Staatliche Bauhochschule Weimar (Hrsg.), Weimar 1928. OCLC 44598980
- Ludwig Neundörfer (Text), Fritz Grieshaber (Fotos): Wie wohnen? Neuzeit-Einrichtung kleiner Wohnungen. Hrsg. im Auftrage des Rhein-Mainischen Verbandes für Volksbildung Frankfurt a. M., Verlag Der Eiserne Hammer, Karl Robert Langewiesche, Königstein im Taunus/Leipzig 1929. OCLC 1069970193
- Adolf Gustav Schneck: Der Stuhl. Stuhltypen aus verschiedenen Ländern und Versuche neuzeitlicher Lösungen in Ansichten und Masszeichnungen (Ausstellungskatalog). Ausstellung September bis Oktober 1928 im Städtischen Ausstellungsgebäude auf dem Interimtheaterplatz. J. Hoffmann, Stuttgart 1928. OCLC 313320763
- Wilhelm Lotz: Wie richte ich meine Wohnung ein? Modern, gut, mit welchen Kosten? Verlag Hermann Reckendorf, Berlin 1930. OCLC 497224171
- Walter Müller-Wulckow: Die deutsche Wohnung der Gegenwart (= Die blauen Bücher). Karl Robert Langewiesche Verlag, Königstein im Taunus/Leipzig 1930. OCLC 230693633
- Dieckmann – Korbmöbel, Verkaufskatalog über die eigene Möbelproduktion. Weimar Bau- und Wohnungskunst G.m.b.H. (Hrsg.), ehemalige Vertriebsgesellschaft der Staatlichen Bauhochschule Weimar, Weimar 1930/31.
- Hans Eckstein: Die schöne Wohnung. Beispiele neuzeitlicher deutscher Wohnräume. Verlag F. Bruckmann AG, München 1931. OCLC 264375505
- Werner Graeff: Jetzt wird ihre Wohnung eingerichtet. Das Warenbuch für den neuen Wohnbedarf (= Zweckmäßiges Wohnen für jedes Einkommen, Bd. 2). Müller und Kiepenheuer, Potsdam 1933. OCLC 250898674
- Gustav Adolf Platz: Wohnräume der Gegenwart. Propyläen-Verlag, Berlin 1933. OCLC 459533971
- Hans Eckstein: Die schöne Wohnung. Wohnräume der Gegenwart in 225 Abb. mit praktischen Erläuterungen. Verlag F. Bruckmann AG, München 1934. OCLC 924033256
- Herbert Hoffmann: Gute Möbel. Zweite Folge. Eine Sammlung zeitgemäßer schöner Einzelmöbel für jeden Gebrauchszweck von den besten Künstlern und Werkstätten (= Haus und Raum. Ratgeber für Bauen und Wohnen, Bd. 3). Julius Hoffmann Verlag, Stuttgart 1936. OCLC 1110888881
- Adolf Gustav Schneck: Das Polstermöbel (= Das Möbel als Gebrauchsgegenstand, Bd. 4). Julius Hoffmann Verlag, Stuttgart 1939. OCLC 1075325508
- Adolf Gustav Schneck: Neue Möbel vom Jugendstil bis heute. Verlag F. Bruckmann, München 1962. OCLC 905301970
- Hans Maria Wingler: Das Bauhaus 1919–1933, Weimar, Dessau, Berlin und die Nachfolge in Chicago seit 1937. Verlag Gebr. Rasch & Co u. DuMont Schauberg, Bramsche 1962. OCLC 1110914624
- Hans Eckstein: Die Neue Sammlung. München 1965. OCLC 78063552
- Walther Scheidig (Text), Klaus G. Beyer (Fotos): Bauhaus Weimar – Werkstattarbeiten 1919–1924. Edition Leipzig 1966. OCLC 312643284
- Dieter Schmidt: Bauhaus – Weimar 1919 bis 1925, Dessau 1925 bis 1932, Berlin 1932 bis 1933. Dresden 1966. OCLC 1005889509
- Jan van Geest, Otakar Máčel, Gerrit Oorthuis: Metalen buismeubels 1925–1940. Ausstellung vom 22. Februar bis 30. März 1975 im Stedelijk Museum Het Prinsenhof, Delft 1975. OCLC 915744842 bzw. W. H. Gispen, Spruyt, Amsterdam 1975. OCLC 929885016
- Hans Eckstein: Der Stuhl. Funktion – Konstruktion – Form. Von der Antike bis zur Gegenwart (= Keysers Sammlerbibliothek). Keysersche Verlagsbuchhandlung, München 1977. ISBN 3-87405-103-X.
- Jan van Geest, Otakar Máčel: Stühle aus Stahl. Metallmöbel 1925–1940. Verlag der Buchhandlung Walther König, Köln 1980. ISBN 3-88375-009-3.
- Wilhelm Nauhaus: Die Burg Giebichenstein. Geschichte einer deutschen Kunstschule 1915–1933. VEB E. A. Seemann Verlag, Leipzig 1981. 2. Aufl. 1992: ISBN 3-363-00539-3.
- Steffen Bräuning: Die Geschichte des Fachbereichs Möbel- und Ausbaugestaltung von den Anfängen der künstlerischen Lehreinrichtung Burg Giebichenstein bis zur Gegenwart. In: 5. Kolloquium zu Fragen der Theorie und Methodik der industriellen Formgestaltung Halle (Tagungsband), 19./20. November 1981. Burg Giebichenstein, Halle/S. 1982. OCLC 946295948
- Steffen Bräuning, Rudolf Horn: Möbel-Ausbau. Hochschule für industrielle Formgestaltung Halle – Burg Giebichenstein (Hrsg.), Halle (Saale) 1983. OCLC 246398480
- Gillian Naylor: The Bauhaus Reassessed – Sources and Design Theory. E. P. Dutton, New York City 1985. ISBN 0-525-24359-3.
- Jan van Geest, Otakar Máčel: Het museum van de continue lijn. Stehen buistochen 1925–1940 / The Museum of the continuous line. Tubular steel chairs 1925–1940. Het Museum van de Continue Lijn (Hrsg.), Amsterdam 1986.
- Alexander von Vegesack: Deutsche Stahlrohrmöbel. 650 Modelle aus Katalogen von 1927 bis 1958. Bangert Verlag, München 1986. ISBN 3-925560-08-4.
- The American Federation of Arts, Derek E. Ostergard, Alessandro Alvera (Hrsg.): Bent Wood and Metal Furniture 1850–1946 (Ausstellungskatalog). University of Washington Press, Seattle, WA, 1987, ISBN 0-295-96409-X und American Federation of Arts, New York City 1987, ISBN 0-917418-80-8.
- Anita Bach, Alexander von Vegesack: Erich Dieckmann – Praktiker der Avantgarde: Möbelbau 1921–1933. Bauhaus Weimar, Bauhochschule Weimar, Burg Giebichenstein, Ausstellung 13. Juni – 30. September 1990, Vitra Design Museum, Weil am Rhein 1990, ISBN 3-9802539-1-0.
- Frank Whitford: Bauhaus. Deutscher Kunstverlag, Berlin 2012. ISBN 978-3-422-07150-6.
- Josef Straßer: 50 Bauhaus-Ikonen, die man kennen sollte, 2. Aufl. Prestel, München 2019, ISBN 978-3-7913-8455-9.
- Manon Bursian u. a. (Hrsg.): Stühle! Dieckmann! Der vergessene Bauhäusler Erich Dieckmann. Mitteldeutscher Verlag, Halle (Saale) 2022, ISBN 978-3-96311-643-8.
- Katja Schneider: „[...] daß ich gern an Ihre Schule kommen würde [...], davon können Sie überzeugt sein." Erich Dieckmann – ein Möbeldesigner aus dem Bauhaus an der Burg Giebichenstein. In: Jahrbuch des halleschen Stadtarchivs 2022, S. 112–181.
- Katja Schneider: Anpassung aus Verzweiflung? Der Möbeldesigner Erich Dieckmann im Banne nationalsozialistischer Ideologie. Vortrag, gehalten auf der Tagung „Bauhaus und Nationalsozialismus" der Klassik Stiftung Weimar, 24./25. Mai 2023 im Goethe-Nationalmuseum in Weimar; Tagungsband erscheint 1924.

== Exhibitions ==
- 1990/91 – Erich Dieckmann – Praktiker der Avantgarde. Möbelbau 1921–1933. Bauhaus Dessau, 28. November 1990 bis 24. Februar 1991.
- 1991 – Erich Dieckmann – Praktiker der Avantgarde. Möbelbau 1921–1933. Kunsthalle am Theaterplatz der Kunstsammlungen zu Weimar, 15. März bis 28. April 1991.
- 2019 – Erich Dieckmann (1896–1944) – Ein Bauhäusler und Burglehrer, im Rahmen des HALLETHEMA 2019 – Halle und die Moderne, Stadtarchiv Halle (Saale), 12. März bis 18. April 2019.
- 2022 – "Ausstellung "Stühle: Dieckmann!" in Halle (Saale)" (in German). hallespektrum.de. 11 February 2022.
- 2022 – "Ausstellung "Stühle: Dieckmann!" in Berlin" (in German). www.smb.museum.
