= Waldsiedlung Zehlendorf =

Housing estate in Berlin, Germany

General information
- Architectural style: Neues Bauen
- Location: Argentinische Allee, Zehlendorf, Berlin, Germany
- Coordinates: 52°27′0″N 13°15′10″E
- Year built: 1926–1932
- Owner: Deutsche Wohnen (apartment buildings); private owners (houses)

Design and construction
- Architects: Bruno Taut, Hugo Häring, Otto Rudolf Salvisberg

The Waldsiedlung Zehlendorf (lit. 'Zehlendorf forest estate'), also known as Onkel Toms Hütte and colloquially as the Papageiensiedlung ("parrot estate"), is a housing estate in the Zehlendorf locality of Berlin, Germany. It was built between 1926 and 1932 for the housing company GEHAG to designs by Bruno Taut, Hugo Häring and Otto Rudolf Salvisberg, and is among the largest and best known German housing estates of the Weimar Republic.

The estate takes its name from a nearby restaurant opened in 1885, whose owner named it after Harriet Beecher Stowe's novel Uncle Tom's Cabin. On 26 July 2026 the estate was inscribed as the seventh component of the UNESCO World Heritage Site Berlin Modernism Housing Estates.

== Planning and construction ==
The estate was built on land at the edge of the Grunewald forest, in a locality that until then had developed mainly as an affluent villa suburb. The housing company GEHAG acquired the southern part of the site in 1926 and financed the project, commissioning Taut, Häring and Salvisberg to prepare the development plan. Taut, who was GEHAG's chief architect, designed the northern section, Salvisberg the southern and Häring the eastern.

Construction proceeded in several phases between 1926 and 1932. The estate comprises 1,917 dwellings in total, of which 1,108 are flats in apartment buildings of up to three storeys and 809 are single-family houses. The existing pine woodland was incorporated into the layout, so that the buildings stand among mature trees.

The extension of the Berlin U-Bahn line to Onkel Toms Hütte station was carried out in parallel with construction, and the estate is laid out around the transport axis formed by the station and the Argentinische Allee. The station is today served by the U3.

Ownership of the estate is divided. The terraced and single-family houses passed into private individual ownership, while the apartment buildings have remained in single ownership. After the former GEHAG portfolio changed hands several times, the roughly 1,100 rental flats came into the ownership of Deutsche Wohnen, which has been part of the Vonovia group since 2021.

== Architecture ==
The estate is a work of Neues Bauen, characterised by flat roofs, plain rendered façades and a restrained repertoire of house types. Rather than the systematic parallel rows favoured elsewhere in the period, the architects varied the arrangement and articulation of the blocks in order to avoid monotony.

Colour was used as a principal design device. Taut assigned different tones according to orientation, so that west-facing elevations were painted in a warm red-brown and east-facing elevations in lighter green and yellow tones, with window and door frames set against the wall colour. This colouring gave rise to the nickname Papageiensiedlung. The term was originally used pejoratively by opponents of the estate and was later adopted by residents themselves. The treatment of the façades has remained a subject of dispute in more recent conservation practice.

== Heritage status ==
The estate is a listed monument in the Berlin monument register.

When six Berlin housing estates of the 1910s to 1930s were inscribed on the World Heritage List in 2008 as the Berlin Modernism Housing Estates, the Waldsiedlung was not among them. The State of Berlin pursued a nomination for an extension of the site from 2021, led by the Berlin State Monument Office. At its 48th session, held in Busan, South Korea, the World Heritage Committee decided on 26 July 2026 to inscribe the estate as the seventh component of the site.

According to the State Monument Office, the inscription has no immediate consequences for residents, and is to be understood as international recognition of the estate's significance. Some residents nevertheless opposed the nomination, criticising the management of the estate by Vonovia and expressing concern that World Heritage status would further establish it as a high-priced prestige location. To mark the estate's centenary and the inscription, the State Monument Office scheduled a festival on the estate from 27 to 30 August 2026.

A cooperative that emerged from a neighbourhood association has examined the suitability of the estate for a low-temperature district heating network.

== Notable residents ==
- Theo Lingen (1903–1978), actor
- Coco Schumann (1924–2018), jazz musician
