= Franz Hillinger =

German architect

Franz Hillinger (March 30, 1895, in Nagyvárad, Hungary – August 18, 1973, in New York) was an architect of the Neues Bauen (New Objectivity) movement in Berlin and in Turkey.

== Early life ==
Hillinger was born to Jewish parents in the dual monarchy of Austria-Hungary, in what was known at that time as the Kingdom of Hungary. He intended to study architecture at the University of Budapest following the completion of his military service during World War I. Due to violent, anti-Semitic demonstrations and subsequent calls for bans on Jewish enrollment and the enactment of restrictive legislation curtailing the Jewish student population, Hillinger instead went to Germany and studied architecture at the Technische Hochschule in Berlin-Charlottenburg (now Technische Universität Berlin) from 1919 to 1922. He met his Protestant wife, Grete, in Berlin. Until 1924, he mainly designed detached, single-family homes for private owners. His first project was a house for Grete's parents on a rural estate on the outskirts of Berlin.

== Neues Bauen ==
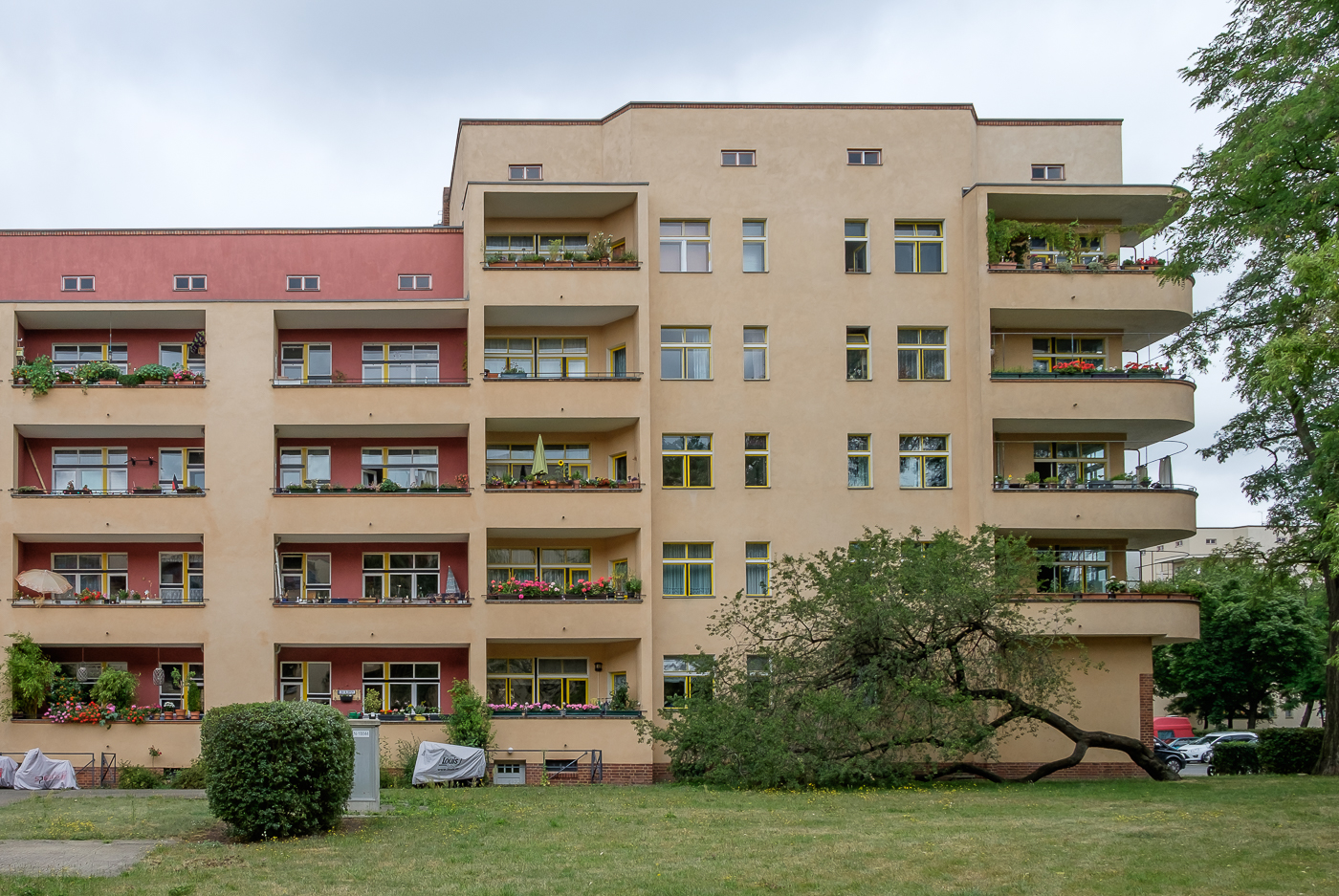
Carl Legien housing estate (constructed 1928–1930)

In 1924, Hillinger became head of the design office at the Gemeinnützige Heimstätten-, Spar- und Bau-Aktengesellschaft (GEHAG), a position he held for nearly ten years; there he collaborated on several projects with Bruno Taut and Martin Wagner, who designed buildings for GEHAG as independent architects. Hillinger's most significant achievement from this period is the Carl Legien Estate, a Berlin modernist housing estate in the Prenzlauer Berg subdivision, which he developed for GEHAG between 1928 and 1930 in collaboration with Bruno Taut.

In 1925, Hillinger envisioned a model community in the Neues Bauen style consisting of 1,145 apartments of 1½ to 3½ rooms each, all with central heating, and each with an ample balcony or loggia. An integral part of his concept for this housing estate were several shops, a communal laundry with childcare, a management office, and large open areas and interior courtyards lush with greenery. Hillinger found inspiration for his endeavor in the Tusschendijken housing project in Rotterdam, built in 1920/21 by Jacobus Johannes Pieter Oud; for this reason, the Carl Legien Estate is sometimes referred to as the "Flemish Quarter."

Because of the Great Depression and the seizure of power by the National Socialists, who rejected the Neues Bauen style, only the first two construction phases were realized according to plan; the third, delayed until the end of the 1930s, was made to conform with the conventional Mietskaserne or rental-barracks style.

From 1931 to 1932, Hillinger was also a lecturer in architecture at TH Berlin as Bruno Taut's assistant.

== Exile ==
With the rise of National Socialism to power in 1933, Hillinger was forced to surrender his position with the GEHAG. In the period immediately following, he worked as an architect only in the underground, designing houses for private owners in Berlin. In 1937, because of his Jewish origins and his membership in the SPD, Hillinger was excluded from the Reichskammer der Bildenden Künste [Reich Chamber of Fine Arts], effectively barred from practicing his profession. Consequently, he emigrated to Turkey in 1937, initially without his family, and joined the German exile community there. His mentor, Bruno Taut, had been living there since 1936, along with a number of prominent exiled architects and city planners. His wife and children were able to join him. His brother, however, was murdered in the Auschwitz concentration camp.

In Turkey, Hillinger was employed as a design architect for the Building Department of the Ministry of Culture, and he began to hold lectures at the Academy of Fine Arts (today Mimar Sinan Fine Arts University) in Istanbul. From 1940 to 1943 he was head of the School of Architecture in Ankara. After the death of Bruno Taut in 1938, Hillinger worked with Taut's staff to complete several works in progress.

In 1948, Hillinger's wife and children emigrated to the United States permanently. In 1951, Hillinger traveled to Canada and from there unsuccessfully tried to enter the United States for the first time. From 1953 to 1956, he was in Ankara supervising construction of the new Parliament building, started in 1939 based on a design by the Austrian architect Clemens Holzmeister. In 1956, Hillinger joined his family in New York, where he worked as an architect until 1970. He died in New York in 1973.

His daughter, Edith Hillinger, was born in Berlin in 1933. She is now an artist living in Northern California. His son, Claude Hillinger, was born in Berlin in 1930. He is an emeritus professor of economics and has lived in Germany since 1972.

== Selected Projects ==
- 1928–1930: Carl Legien Estate, Berlin (site management, based on design by Hillinger and Bruno Taut); since July 2008 included in the UNESCO World Heritage List "Berlin Modernism Housing Estates"
- 1937: Boys' Boarding High School in Trabzon (Trabzon Erkek Lisesi; site management by Franz Hillinger based on design by Bruno Taut)
- 1937–38: Ankara Atatürk High School (Ankara Atatürk Lisesi; site management by Franz Hillinger based on design by Bruno Taut and Asım Kömürcüoğlu)
- 1938: Pavilion of the Ministry of Culture for the İzmir International Fair (İzmir Enternasyonal Fuarı; design von Bruno Taut in collaboration with Hans Grimm and Franz Hillinger)
- 1938: Middle School in the Cebeci quarter of Ankara (Kurtuluş İlk Öğretim Okulu, also Cebeci Ortaokulu; site management by Franz Hillinger, based on design by Bruno Taut)
- 1940: Faculty of Letters building at the University of Ankara (designed and begun by Bruno Taut at the end of 1936; after Taut's death in 1938, Hillinger completed the construction in collaboration with Hans Grimm)
