= New Objectivity (architecture) =

Architecture movement in (mainly German-speaking) Europe

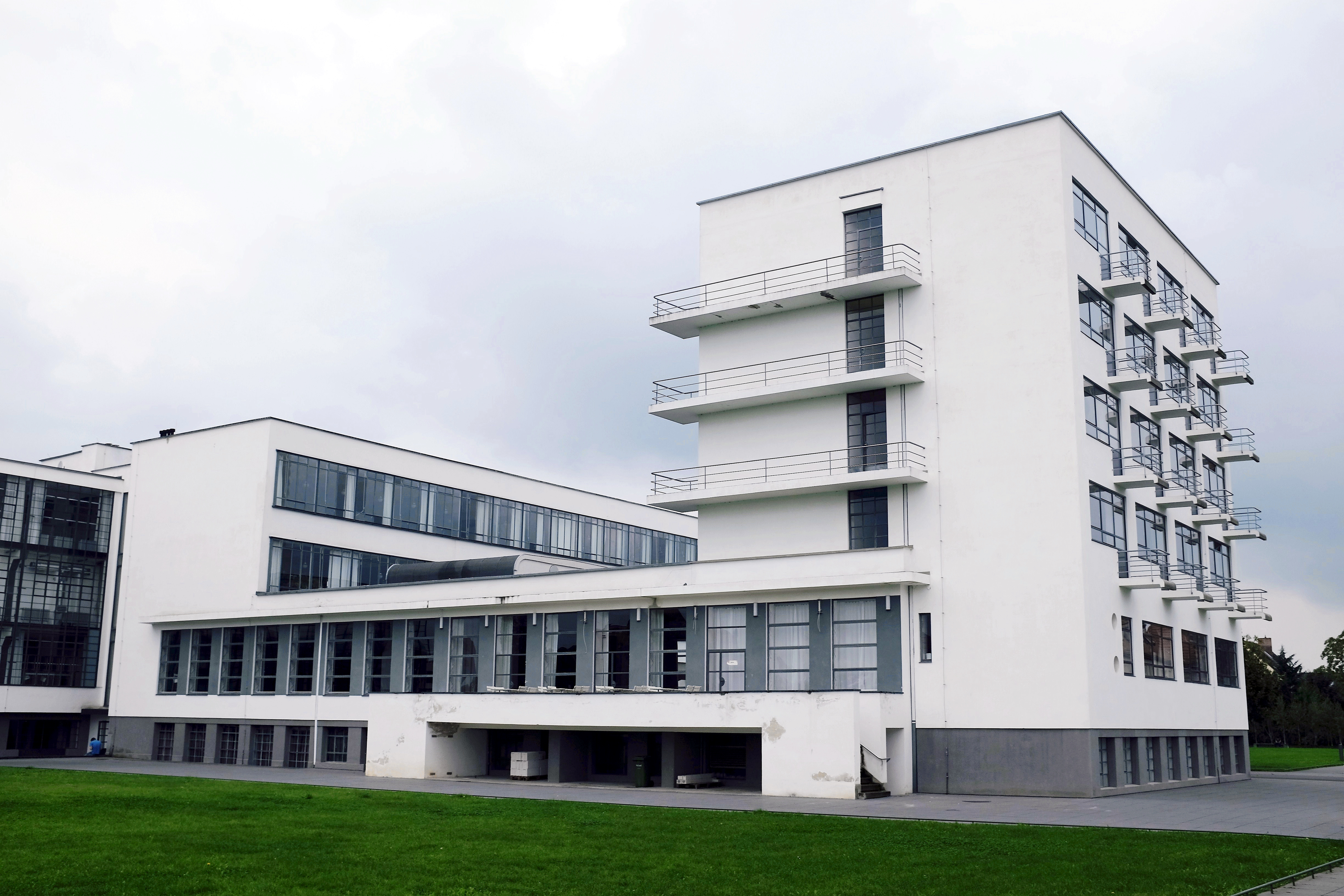
The student accommodation wing, Bauhaus Dessau building by Walter Gropius (1925–26).

The New Objectivity (a translation of the German term Neue Sachlichkeit, sometimes also translated as New Sobriety) is a name often given to the modern architecture that emerged in Europe, primarily German-speaking Europe, in the 1920s and 30s. It is also frequently called Neues Bauen (New Building). Many German cities were remodeled in the style during this period.

== Werkbund and Expressionism ==
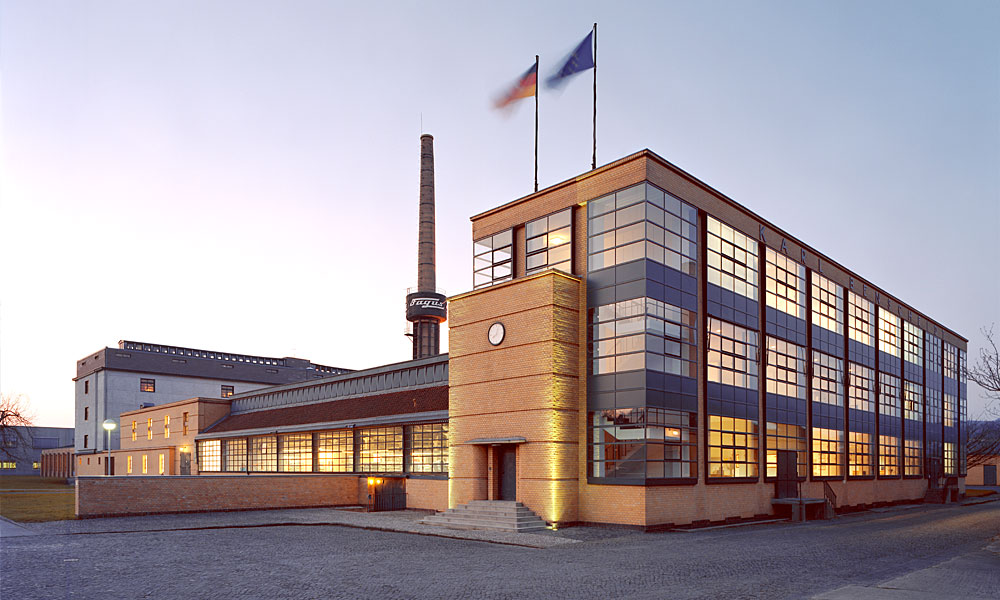
Gropius and Meyer's Fagus Factory.

The earliest examples of the style date to before the First World War, under the auspices of the Deutscher Werkbund's attempt to provide a modern face for Germany. Many of the architects who would become associated with the New Objectivity were practicing in a similar manner in the 1910s, using glass surfaces and severe geometric compositions. Examples of this include Walter Gropius and Adolf Meyer's 1911 Fagus Factory or Hans Poelzig's 1912 department store in Breslau (Wrocław).

However, in the aftermath of the war, these architects (as well as others such as Bruno Taut) worked in the revolutionary Arbeitsrat für Kunst, pioneering Expressionist architecture, particularly through the secret Glass Chain group. The early works of the Bauhaus, such as the Sommerfeld House, were in this vein. Expressionism's dynamism and use of glass (whether for transparency or colour effects) would be a mainstay of the New Objectivity.

== Effects of De Stijl and Constructivism ==
The turn from Expressionism towards the more familiarly Modernist styles of the mid-late 1920s came under the influence of the Dutch avant-garde, particularly De Stijl, whose architects such as Jan Wils and JJP Oud had adapted ideas derived from Frank Lloyd Wright into cubic social housing, inflected with what Theo van Doesburg called 'the machine aesthetic'.

Also steering German architects away from Expressionism was the influence of Constructivism, particularly of Vkhutemas and of El Lissitzky, who stayed in Berlin frequently during the early 1920s. Another element was the work in France of Le Corbusier, such as the proposals for the concrete 'Citrohan' house. In addition, Erich Mendelsohn had already been veering away from Expressionism towards more streamlined, dynamic forms, such as in his Mossehaus newspaper offices and the Gliwice Weichsmann factory, both 1921–1922.

== Early houses and estates ==
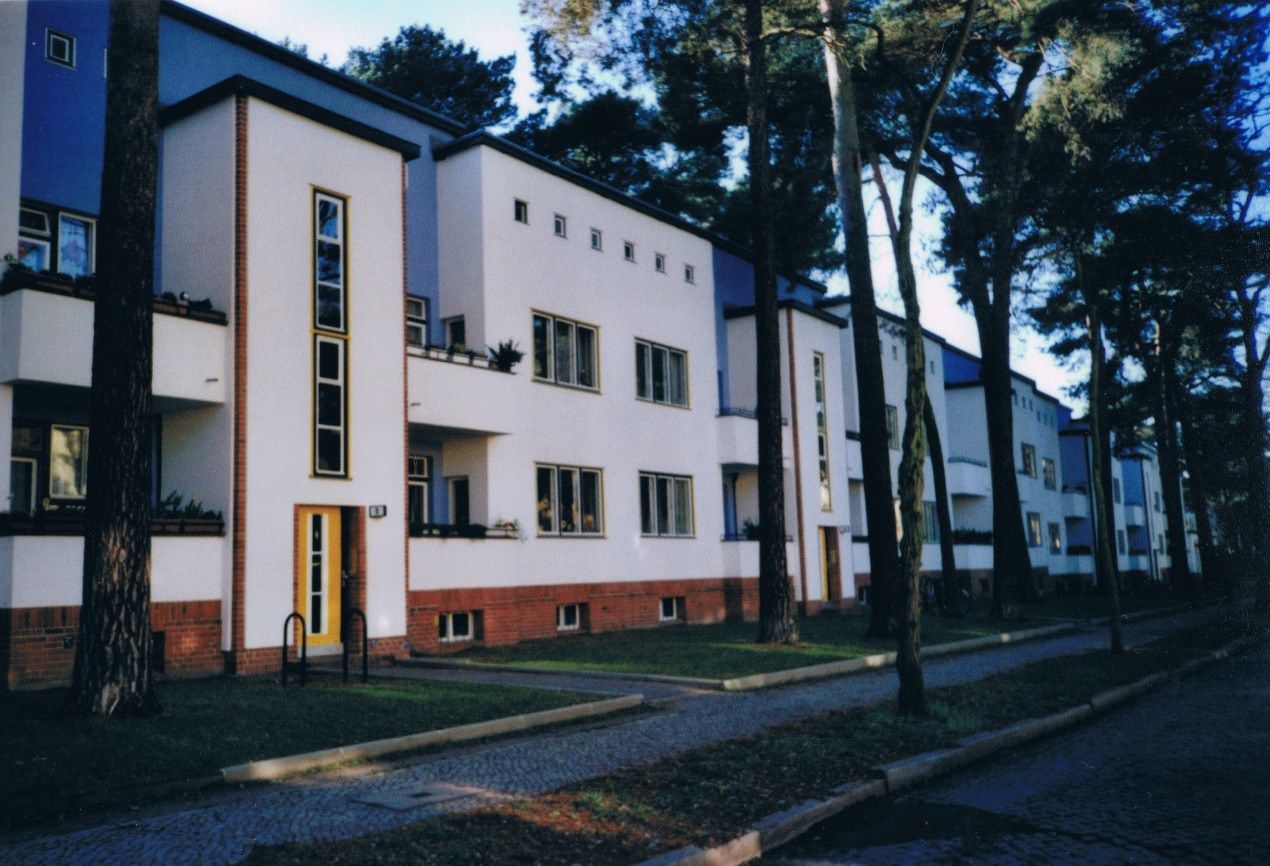
Bruno Taut, Onkel-Toms-Hütte, Wilskistrasse, Berlin.

Perhaps the earliest examples of the 'New Building' in Germany were at the 1922 Bauhaus exhibition, Georg Muche's Haus am Horn, and, in the same year, Gropius/Meyer's design for Chicago's Tribune Tower competition. However, the fullest early exploration of a new, non-expressionist avant-garde idiom was in the 1923–24 'Italienischer Garten' in Celle by Otto Haesler.

This was the first Modernist Siedlung (literally "settlement", though "estate" would be more precise), an area of new-build social housing characterised by flat roofs, an irregular, asymmetrical plan, with houses arranged in south-facing terraces with generous windows and rendered surfaces. Contrary to the 'white box' idea later popularised by the International Style, these were frequently painted in bright colors. The strongest proponent of color among the housing architects was Bruno Taut.

== New Frankfurt ==
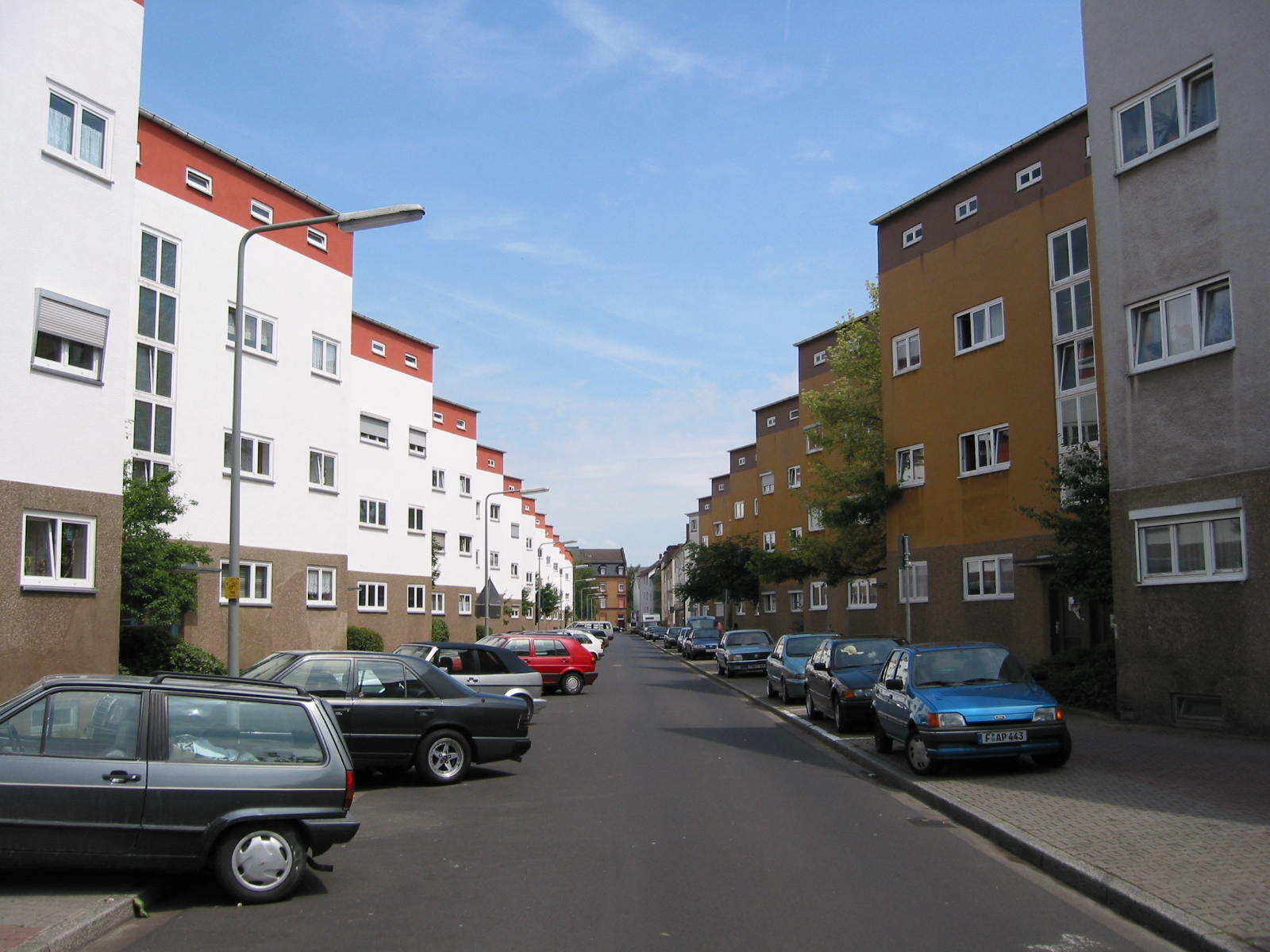
Ernst May, 'Zig-Zag Houses' in Frankfurt.

The major expansion of this came with the appointment of Ernst May to the position of city architect and planner by the Social Democratic administration of Frankfurt-am-Main. May was trained by the British garden city planner Raymond Unwin, and his Siedlungen showed garden city influence in their use of open space: they totally repudiated the nostalgic style of Unwin's projects such as Hampstead Garden Suburb. May's 'New Frankfurt' would be enormously important for the subsequent development of the New Objectivity, not only because of its striking appearance but also in its success in quickly re-housing thousands of the city's poor.

However, their advanced streamlining techniques often alienated the building profession, much of whom were made superfluous by the lack of ornament and speed of construction. May would also employ other architects in Frankfurt such as Margarete Schütte-Lihotzky (where she developed the Frankfurt kitchen) and Mart Stam. The immediate effect of May's work can be seen in Gropius's 1926 Siedlung Dessau-Törten in Dessau (built around the same time as the more famous Bauhaus building), which also pioneered prefabrication technology. That Germany had become the centre of the New Building – as it was called, in preference to 'the New Architecture' – was confirmed by the Werkbund's Weissenhof Estate of 1927, where despite the presence of Le Corbusier and JJP Oud, most of the architects were German speaking. Further Werkbund Estate-exhibitions were mounted in Wrocław and Vienna in subsequent years.

== Functionalism and the Minimum Dwelling ==
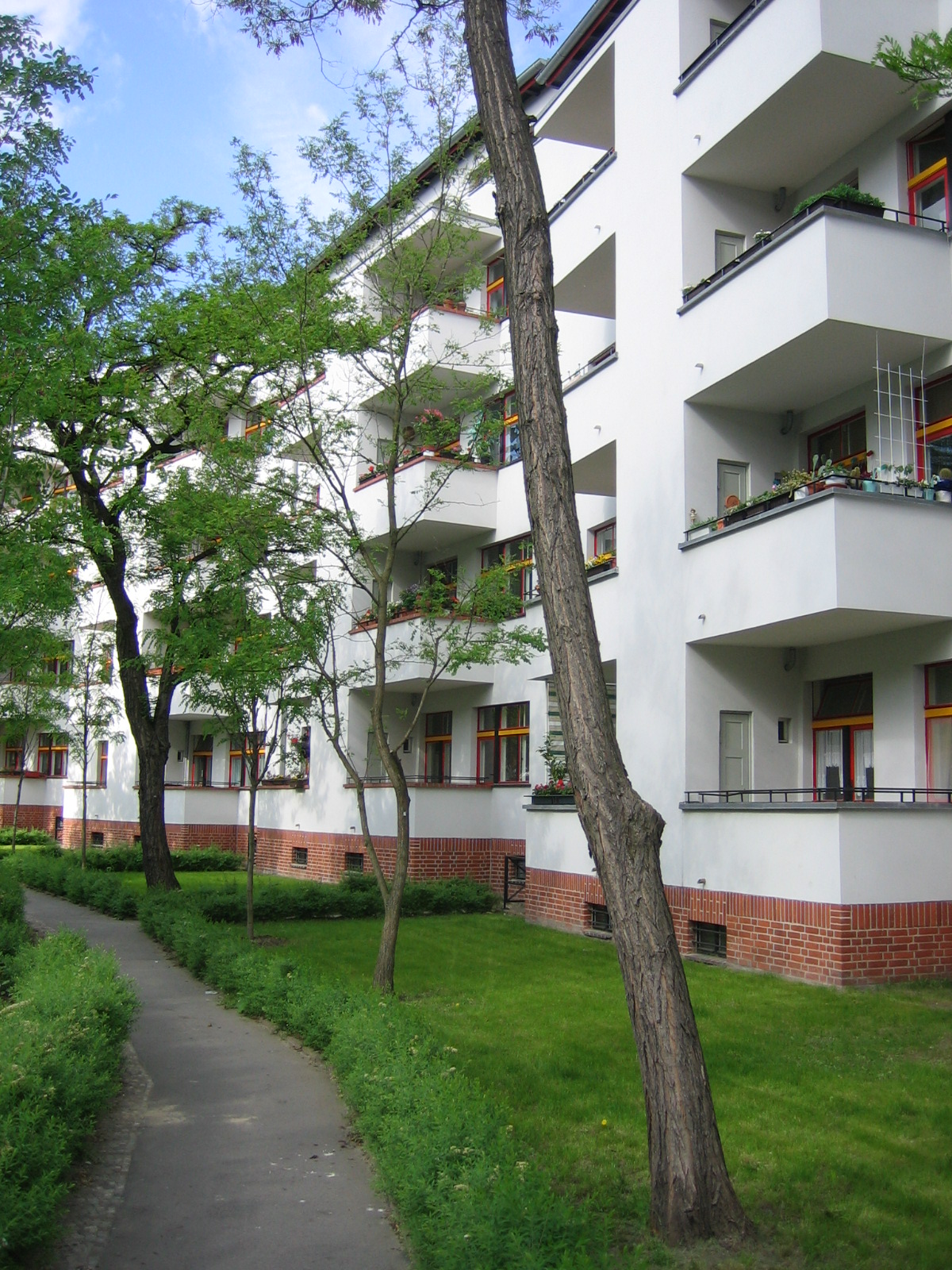
Bruno Taut, flats in Berlin's Prenzlauer Berg.

The architects of the New Objectivity were eager to build as much cost-effective housing as possible, partly to address Germany's postwar housing crisis, and partly to fulfill the promise of Article 155 of the 1919 Weimar Constitution, which said that the state would "promote the object of assuring to every German a healthful habitation". This phrase drove the technical definition of Existenzminimum (subsistence dwelling) in terms of minimally-acceptable floorspace, density, fresh air, access to green space, access to transit, and other such resident issues.

At the same time there was a massive expansion of the style across German cities. In Berlin, architect-planner Martin Wagner worked with the former Expressionists Bruno Taut and Hugo Häring on colourful developments of flats and terraced houses such as the 1925 Horseshoe Estate, the 1926 'Uncle Tom's Cabin' (Onkel-Toms-Hütte) and the 1929 'Carl-Legien-Siedlung', through the auspices of the Trade Unionist building society GEHAG. Taut's designs featured controversially modern flat roofs, humane access to sun, air and gardens, and generous amenities like gas, electric light, and bathrooms. Critics on the political Right complained that these developments were too opulent for 'simple people'.

The progressive Berlin mayor Gustav Böss defended them: "We want to bring the lower levels of society higher." Similar experiments in municipal socialism such as the Viennese Gemeindebau were more stylistically eclectic, so Frankfurt and Berlin's authorities were taking a gamble on public approval of the new style.

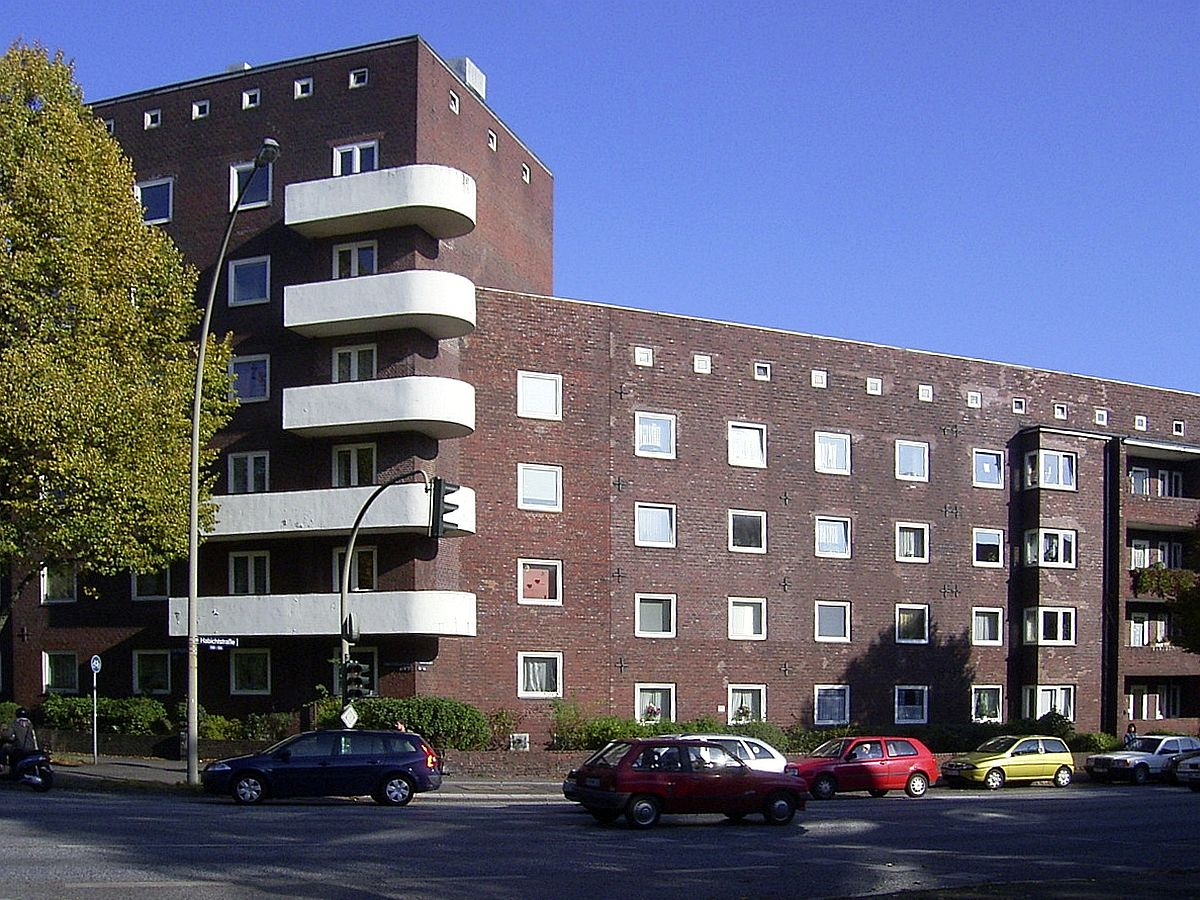
Karl Schneider, flats in Hamburg, 1929.

Elsewhere, Karl Schneider designed Estates in Hamburg, Ludwig Mies van der Rohe designed low-cost houses in Berlin's Afrikanische Strasse (and in 1926, a monument to Rosa Luxemburg and Karl Liebknecht) while straight-aligned, and to their critics, schematic Zeilenbau flats were built to the designs of Otto Haesler, Gropius and others in Dammerstock, Karlsruhe. The term Functionalism began to be used to denote the rather severe, nothing superfluous ethos of the New Objectivity, being used as early as 1925 by Adolf Behne in his book Der Moderne Zweckbau ("The Modern Functional Building").

In 1926, practically all Modernist German architects organised themselves into a group known as Der Ring, which attracted criticism from architects that proceeded to become leading proponents of Nazi architecture, like Paul Schultze-Naumburg who formed Der Block in response. In 1928 the Congrès International d'Architecture Moderne (CIAM) had formed, and its earliest conferences, dedicated to questions of Existenzminimum were dominated by the social programmes of German architects.

== Spread of the New Objectivity ==
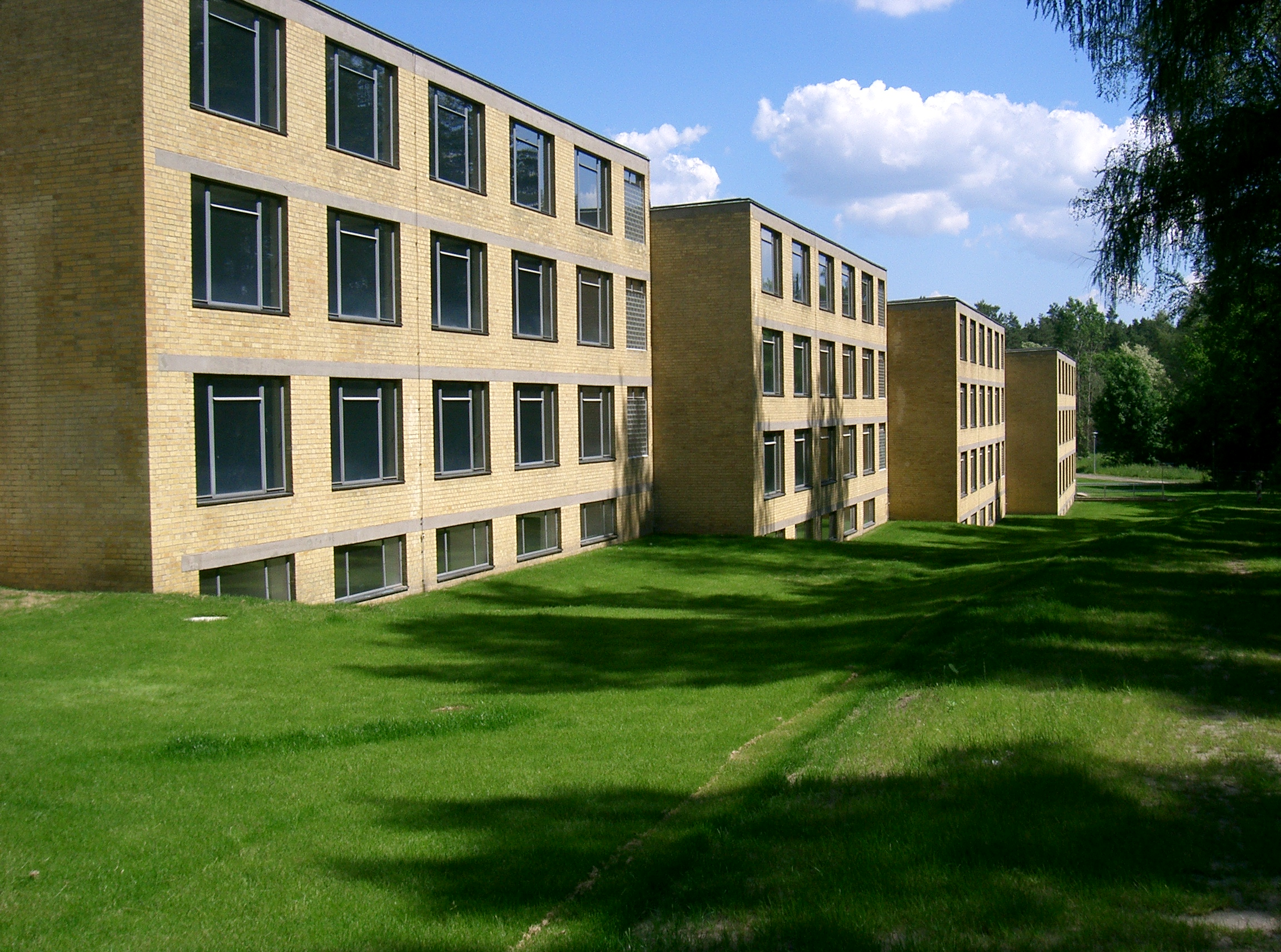
Student halls of residence, ADGB Trade Union School, 1928–1930.

A leftist, technologically oriented wing of the movement had formed in Switzerland and the Netherlands, the so-called ABC Group. It was made up of collaborators of El Lissitzky such as Mart Stam and Hannes Meyer, whose greatest work was the glassy expanse of the Van Nelle Factory in Rotterdam. The clean lines of the New Objectivity were also being used for schools and public buildings, by May in Frankfurt, in Hannes Meyer's ADGB Trade Union School in Bernau and Max Taut's Alexander von Humboldt School in Berlin, as well as police administration and office buildings in Berlin under Martin Wagner.

Cinemas, which would be very influential on Streamline Moderne picture palaces, were designed by Erich Mendelsohn (Kino-Universum, now Schaubühne am Lehniner Platz, Berlin, 1926) and Hans Poelzig (Kino Babylon, Rosa-Luxemburg-Strasse, Berlin, 1928–29) A composite style that used the new forms with more traditional masonry building was developed by Poelzig with his Haus des Rundfunks in Berlin and IG Farben Building in Frankfurt, and by Emil Fahrenkamp in his undulating Berlin Shell-Haus.

Meanwhile, Erich Mendelsohn's architecture had developed into a 'dynamic functionalism' for commerce, seen in his curvaceous department stores such as the Columbus-Haus in Berlin (demolished in the 1950s) and in the Schocken Department Stores, in Stuttgart (demolished in the 1960s) Chemnitz and Wrocław. In Munich Robert Vorhoelzer and Robert Poeverlein founded the "Bayerische Postbauschule" and built many modernist post offices while the architectural mainstream of 1920s and 1930s Munich still preferred the nostalgic Heimatstil.

The Great Depression, beginning in 1929, had a disastrous effect on the New Building, because of Germany's financial dependence on the USA. Many estates and projects planned in Frankfurt and Berlin were postponed indefinitely, while the architectural profession became politically polarised, something symbolised by the sacking in 1930 of the Marxist Bauhaus director Hannes Meyer—who had stressed, with his collaborators Ludwig Hilberseimer and Mart Stam, the importance of working class and collective housing—to be replaced by Mies van der Rohe, whose Barcelona Pavilion and Tugendhat House had gained him a reputation as a purveyor of luxury to the rich, and proceeded to turn the Bauhaus into a private school.

== Dispersal and exile ==
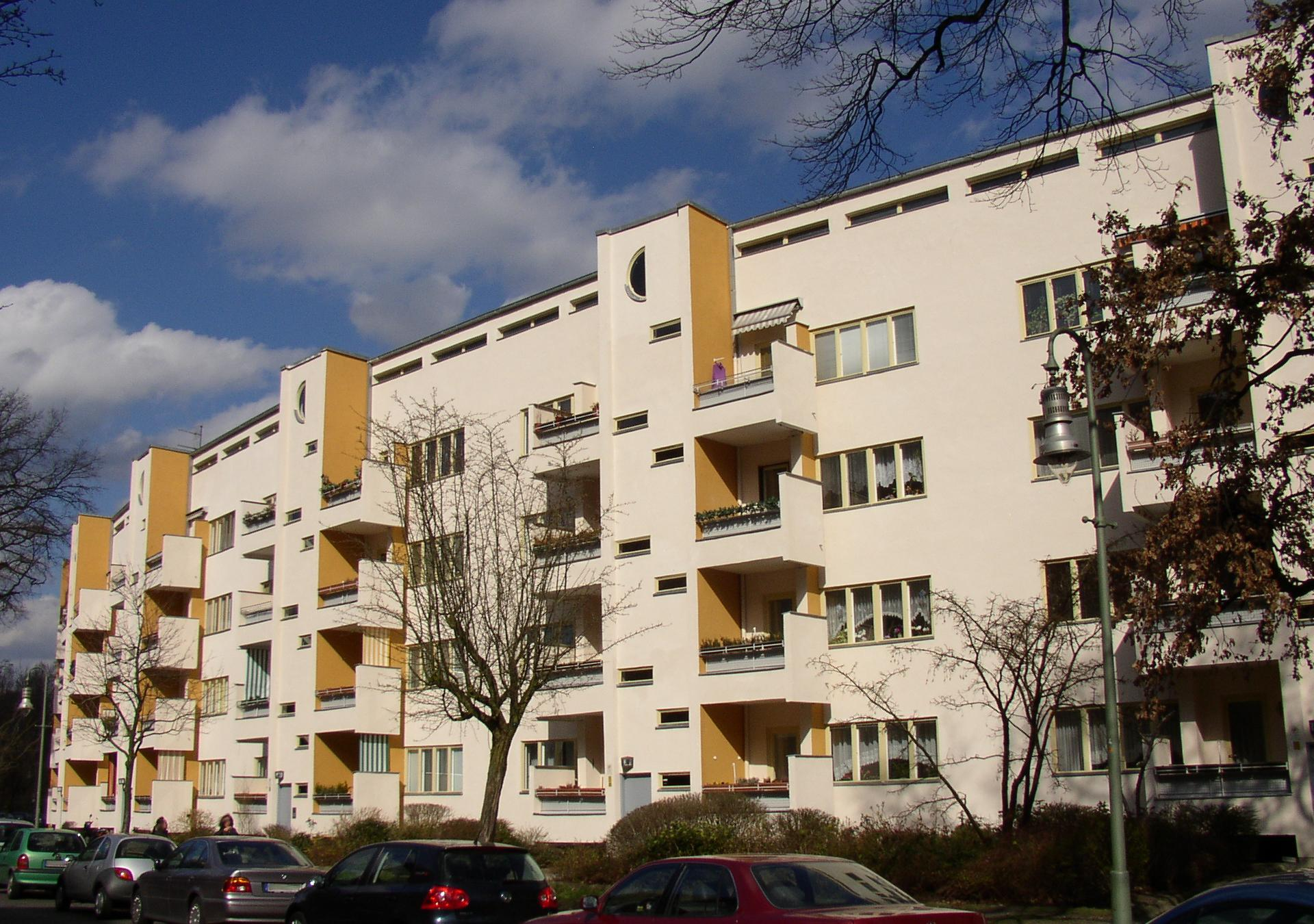
Flats in Berlin-Siemenstadt, Hans Scharoun.

Important work within Germany continued into the early 1930s, particularly the Ring's Siemensstadt Estate in Berlin, which was planned by Hans Scharoun as a more individual and humane version of the 'existence minimum' residential housing formula. But the political mood turned uglier through that time, with open hostile press, and direct pressure on Jewish and/or Social Democratic architects to leave the country. Many prominent German modernists went to the Soviet Union.

Since 1920, Moscow had been the site of the Russian state-run art and technical school, a close parallel to the Bauhaus, Vkhutemas, and there had been significant cultural connection through the cross-fertilization of El Lissitzky. Russia had colossal plans for entire cities of worker housing, and an eye on acquiring German expertise. Ernst May, Stam, and Schütte-Lihotzky moved there in 1930 to design New Towns like Magnitogorsk, with Hannes Meyer's so-called 'Bauhaus Brigade' and Bruno Taut soon to follow.

But the Russian experiment was over almost before it started. Working conditions proved hopeless, supplies impossible to get, and the labor unskilled and uninterested. Stalin's acceptance of the "retrograde" Palace of Soviets entry in the February 1932 competition provoked a strong reaction from the international modernist community, particularly Le Corbusier. The modernists had just lost their biggest client. Internal Russian politics led to vicious in-fighting among Russian architects' unions, and an equally vicious campaign against foreign 'specialists'. Some designers did not survive the experience.

Others would leave Germany for Japan, or for the sizable German-exile community in Istanbul. Major architects in the modernist community ended up as far afield as Kenya, Mexico, and Sweden.

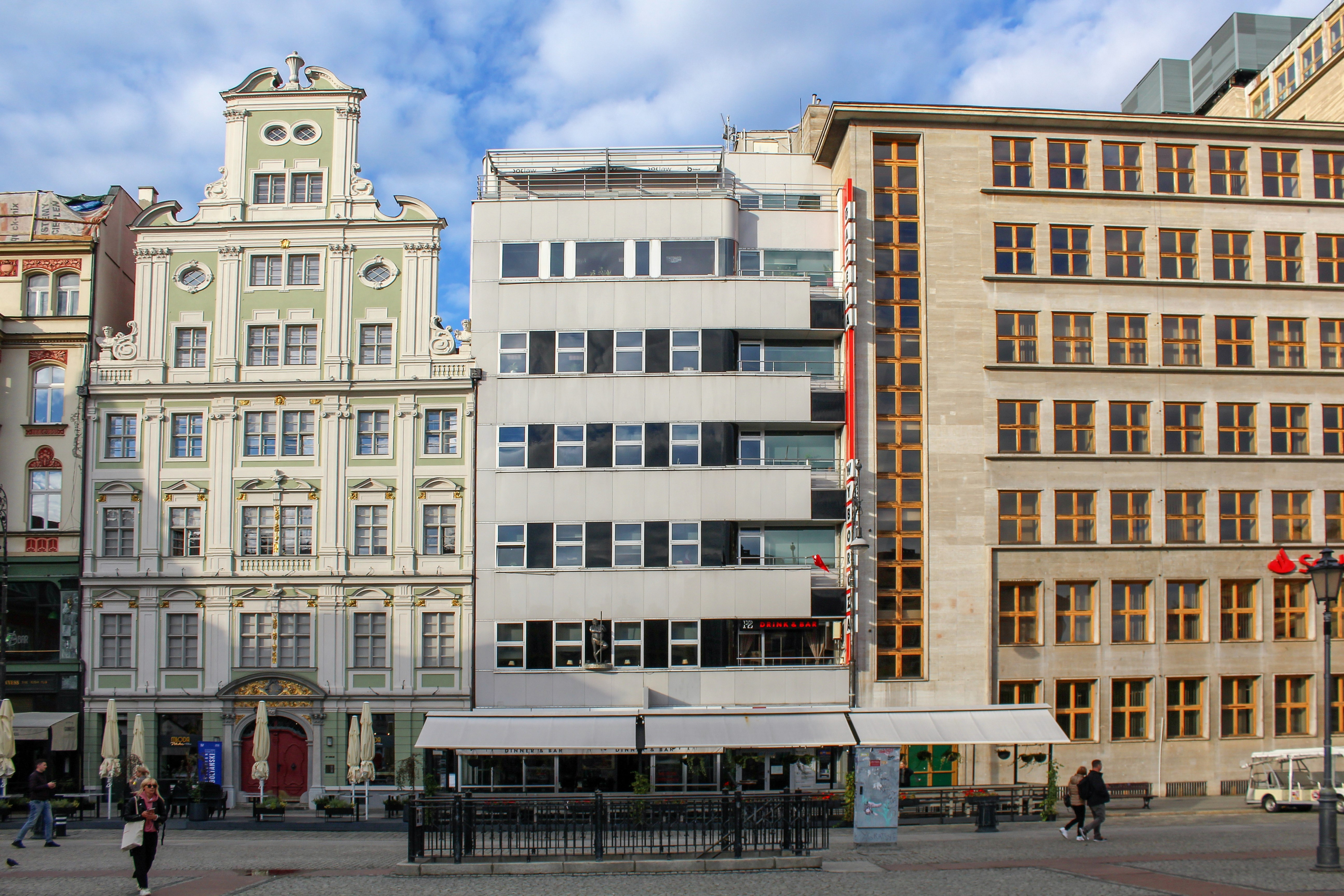
Adolf Rading's Mohren Pharmacy in Wrocław.

Others left for the Isokon Project and other projects in England, then eventually to the United States, where Gropius, Breuer and Berlin city planner Martin Wagner would educate a generation of students at the Harvard Graduate School of Design.

More popularly, in the United States, the publication of Philip Johnson and Henry-Russell Hitchcock's groundbreaking International Style MOMA exhibition and book of 1932 established an official "canon" of the style, with an emphasis on Mies, Gropius, and Le Corbusier. Attention to these three came as the expense of the Social Democratic context of Neues Bauen, and the architectural logic of state-sponsored mass-produced dwellings. Johnson and Hitchcock derided 'fanatical functionalists' like Hannes Meyer for building for "some proletarian superman of the future". Although stripped of its social meaning and intellectual rigor on import to the USA, the New Objectivity would nevertheless be enormously influential on the postwar development of modern architecture worldwide.

Characterization of New Objectivity as an architectural style to begin with would have provoked strong disagreement from its practitioners. In the words of Gropius, they believed that buildings should be "shaped by internal laws without lies and games," and that the practice of building would transcend the use of ornament and any stylistic categorization. In German the phrase Neues Bauen, dating from a 1919 book by Erwin Gutkind, captures this idea, because Bauen connotes 'construction' as opposed to 'architecture'.

== Gallery ==
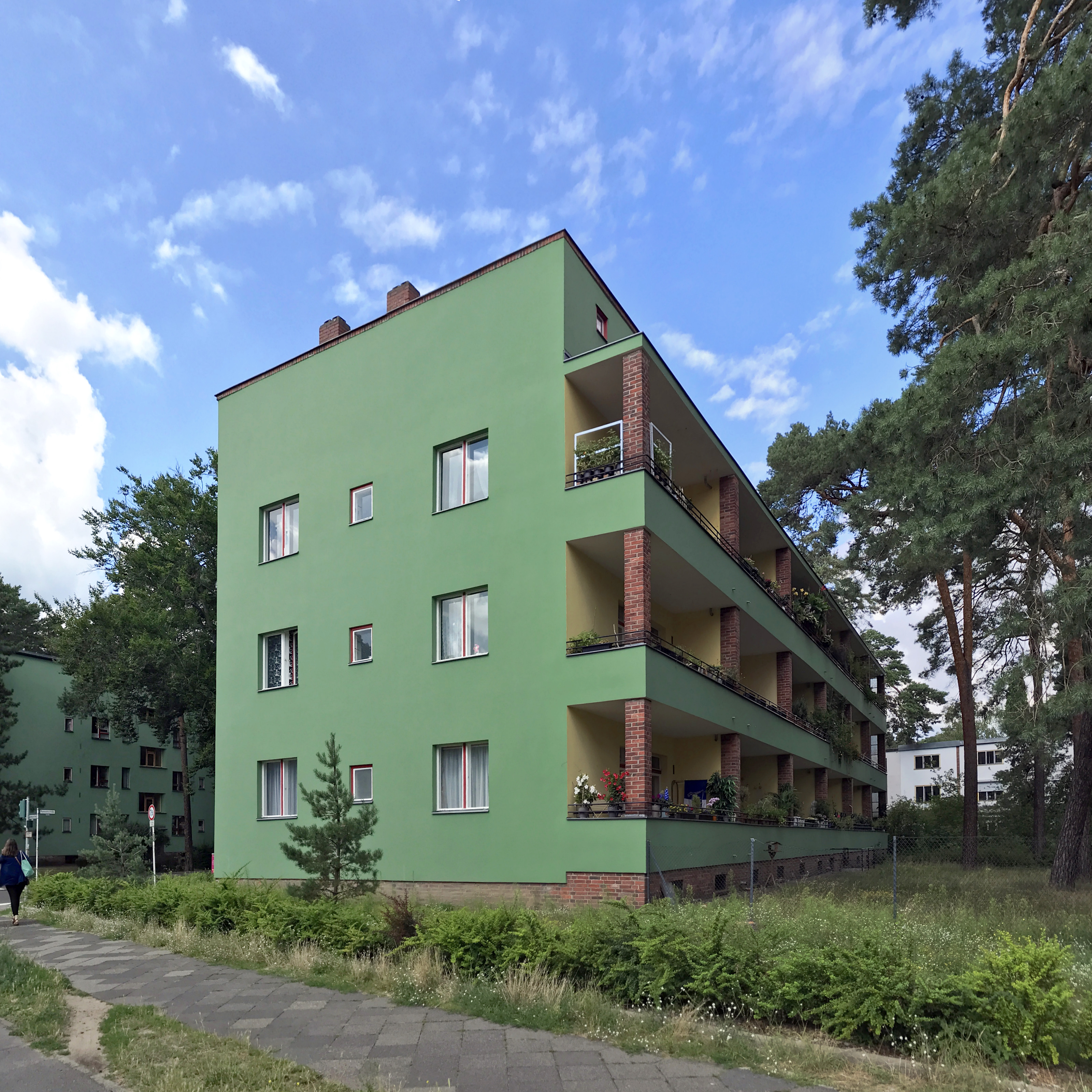
Bruno Taut, Onkel-Toms-Hütte, Berlin

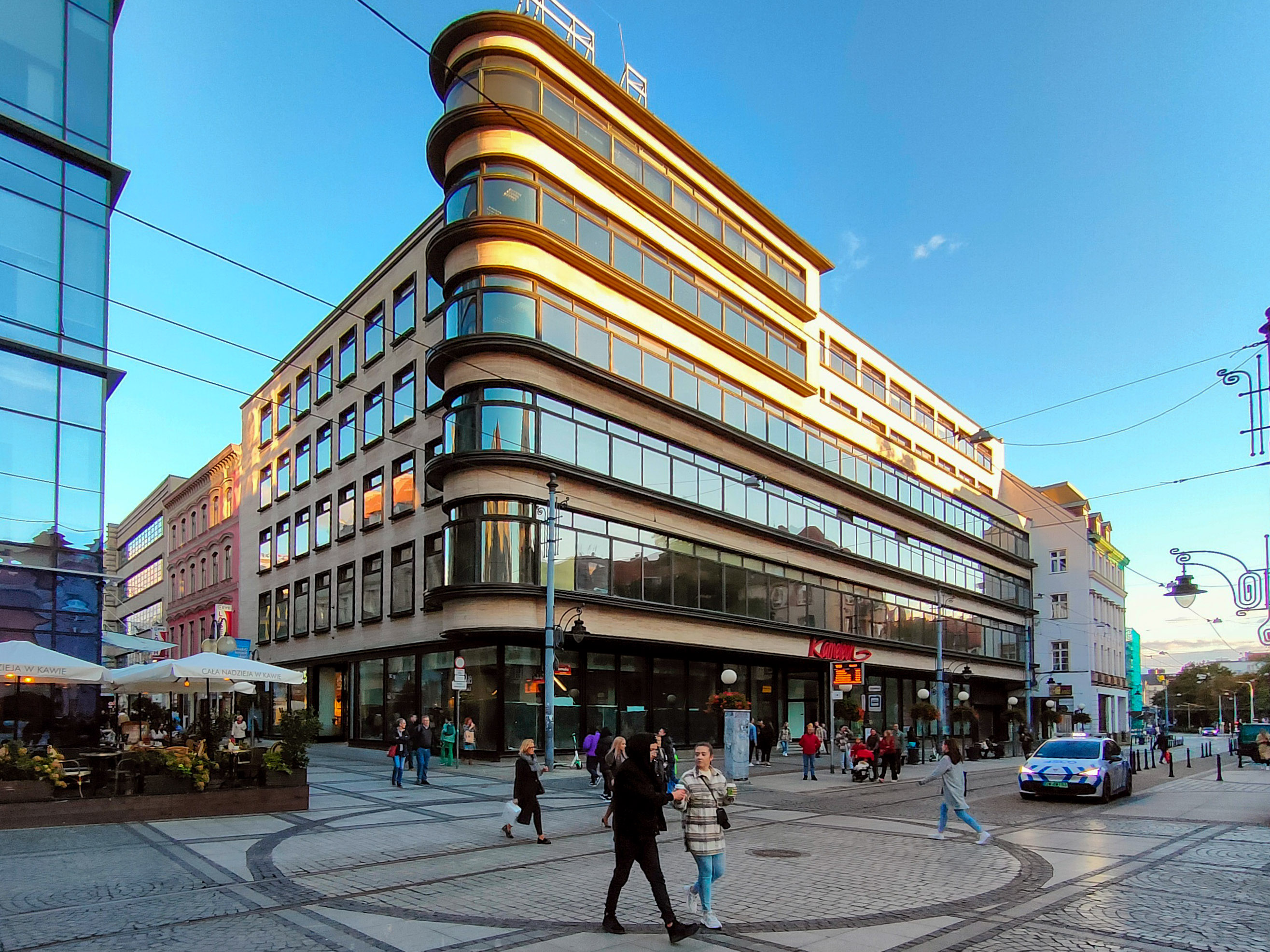
Erich Mendelsohn, Petersdorff Store, now Kameleon in Wrocław

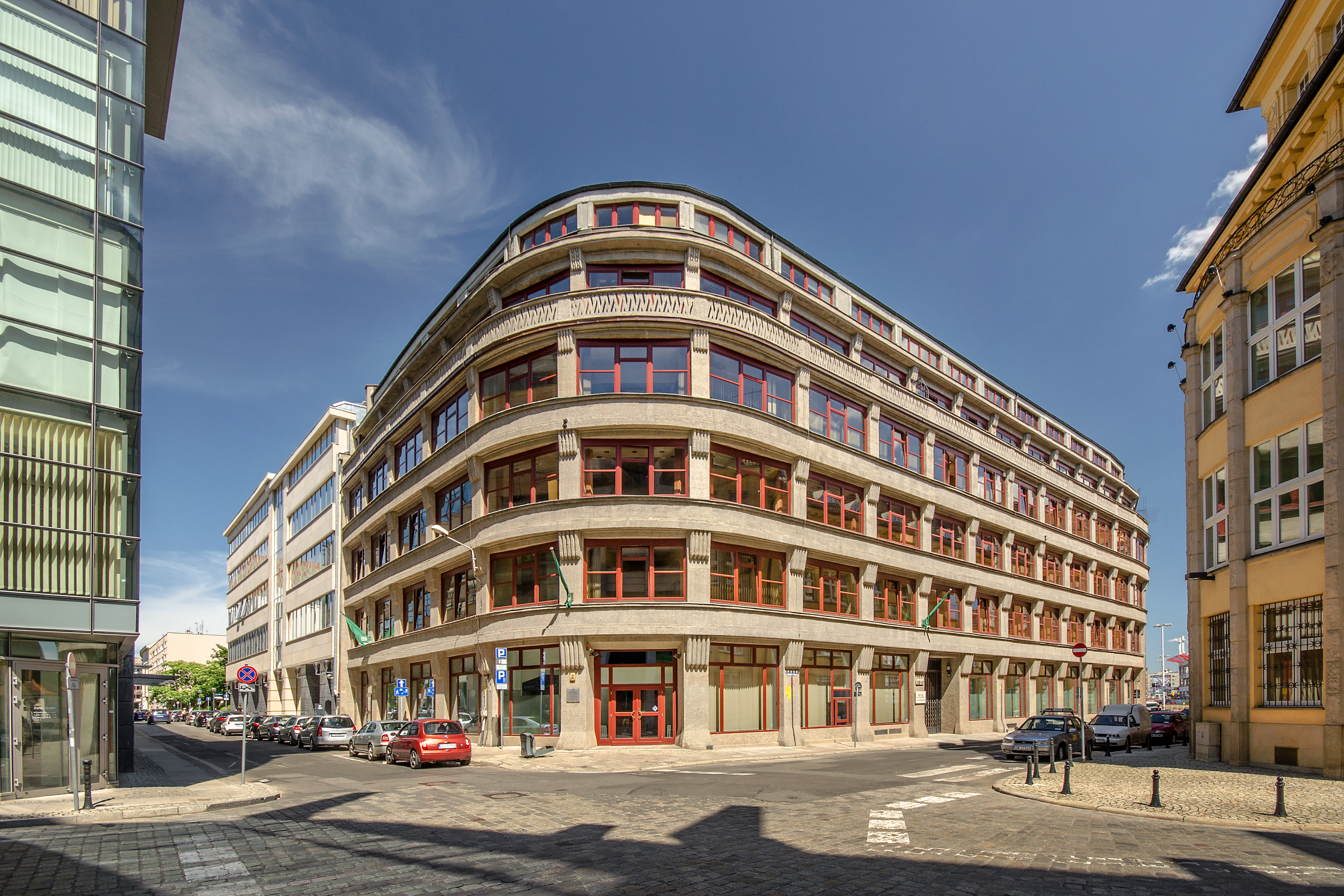
Department Store by Hans Poelzig, Wrocław

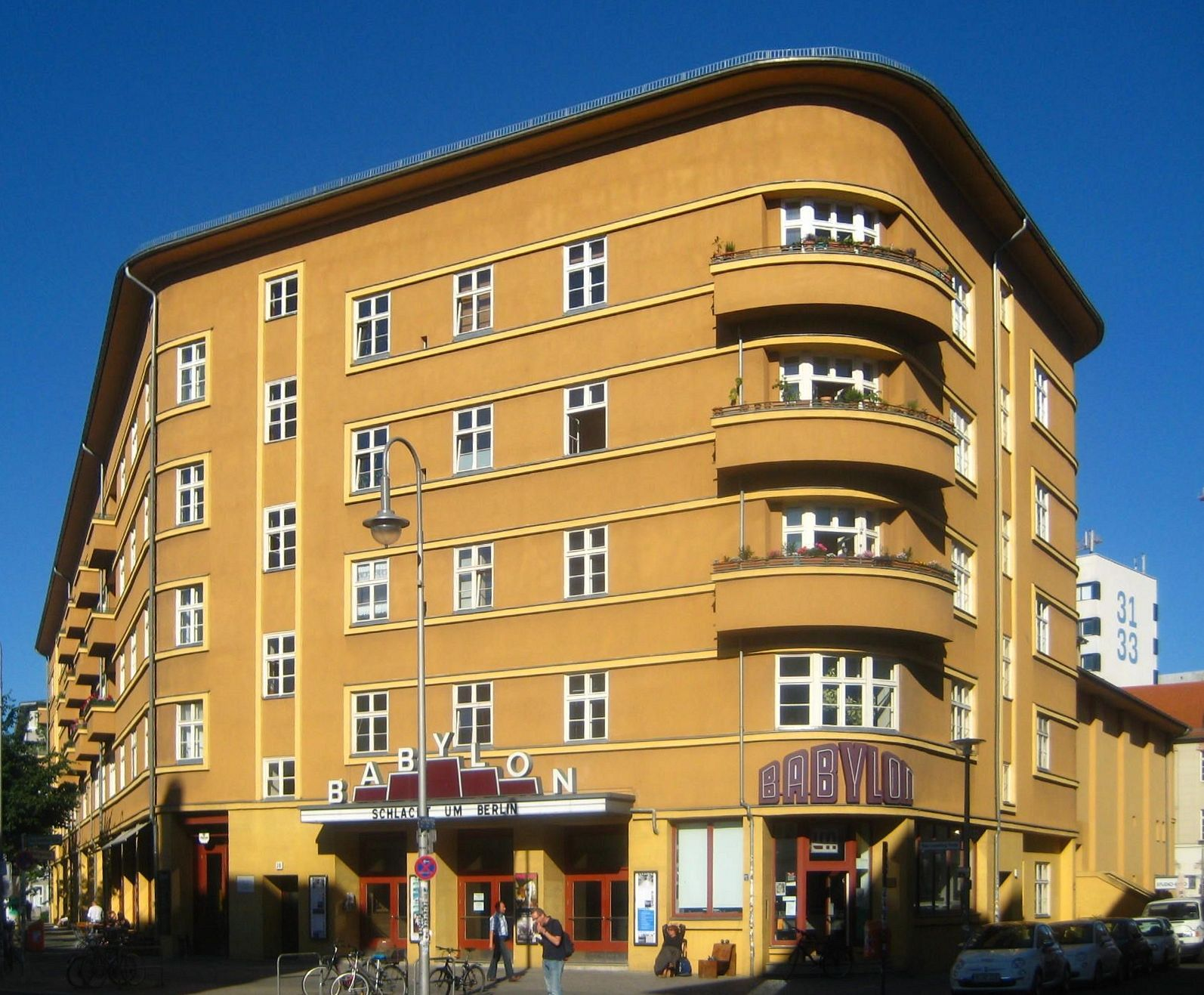
Kino Babylon, Berlin. Designed 1928-29 by Hans Poelzig
