= Hufeisensiedlung =

Housing estate in Berlin, Germany

Coordinates: 52°26′51″N 13°26′55″E

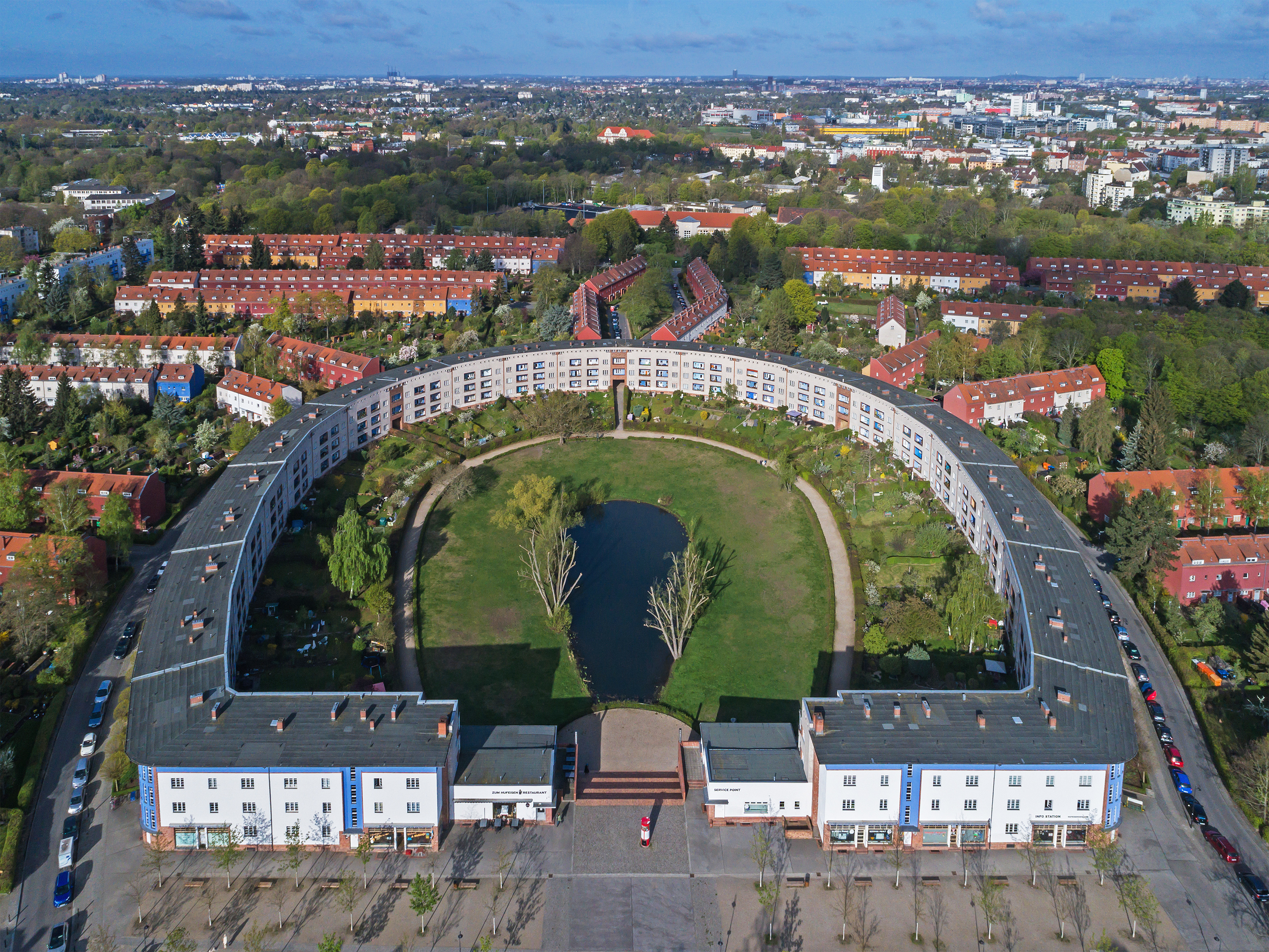
Central building structure of the "Horseshoe"

The Hufeisensiedlung ("Horseshoe Estate") is a housing estate in Berlin, built in 1925–33. It was designed by architect Bruno Taut, municipal planning head and co-architect Martin Wagner, garden architect Leberecht Migge and Neukölln gardens director Ottokar Wagler. In 1986 the ensemble was placed under German heritage protection. On 7 July 2008 it was inscribed as one of six estates that constitute the Berlin Modernism Housing Estates World Heritage Site.

== Historical background ==
At the beginning of the 20th century Berlin was growing dramatically. From 1850 to the end of the 1920s its population had roughly doubled every 25 years. It was not only the cultural heyday of the Golden Twenties which caused a rapid increase in population, but also the advance of industrialisation and the end of the First World War. Groß-Berlin (Greater Berlin), which had only come about in 1920 through the amalgamation of several districts in the city and its suburbs, was doing full justice to its name. At 3.8 million people, the number of inhabitants not only exceeded today's population but also made Berlin the third-largest metropolis in the world at that time after New York and London.

== Reformist housing and concepts of urban planning ==
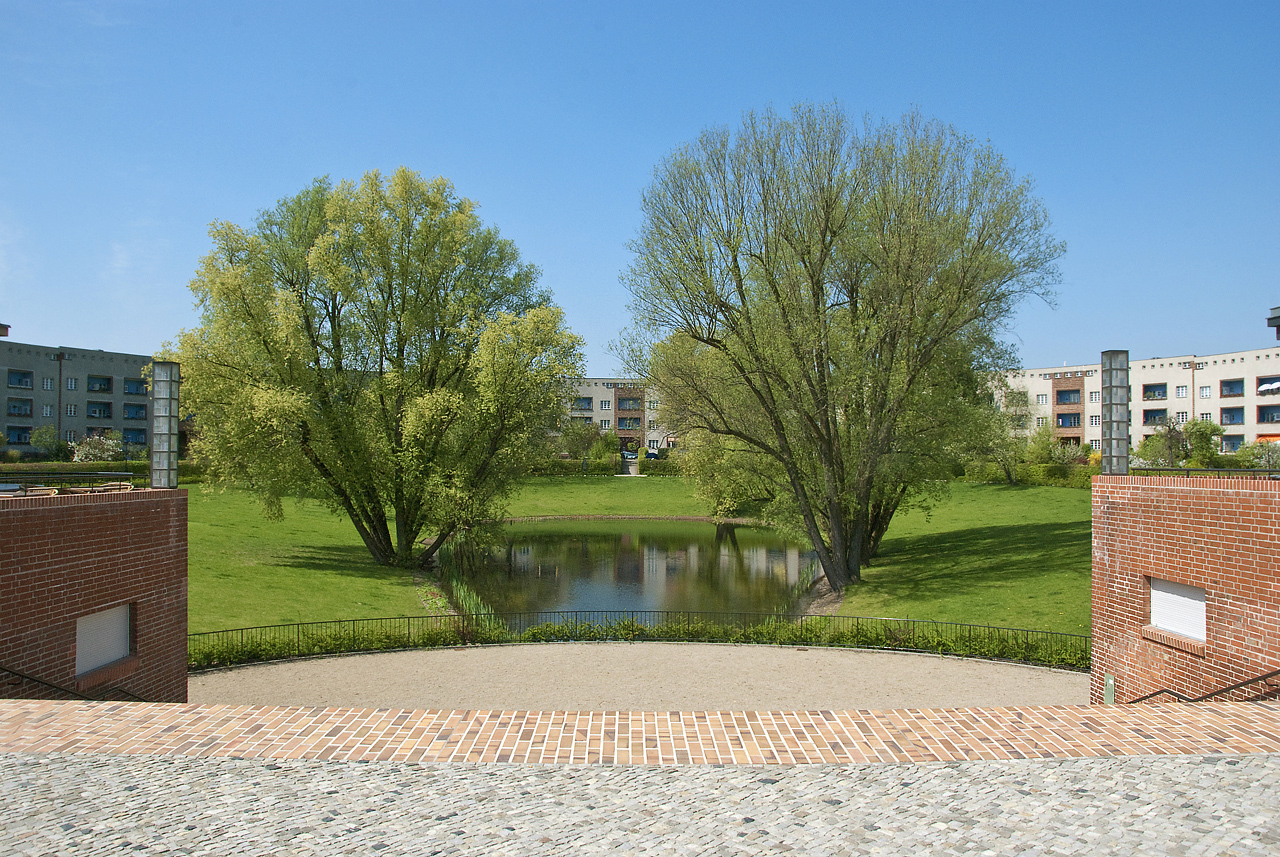
View from the central staircase after restoration 2013

This enormous influx of people was confronted with a lack of housing, particularly in working class districts like Neukölln, Kreuzberg, Prenzlauer Berg or Wedding. During the interwar period, housing was built on a large scale by the city of Berlin for broad sections of the population. From 1924 to 1931 alone 140,000 apartments were built. In order to provide an appropriate organizational body for the construction of these estates, housing cooperatives were founded. One of these enterprises, GEHAG (Gemeinnützige Heimstätten-, Spar- und Bau-Aktiengesellschaft), founded in 1924, hired Bruno Taut to act as the chief architect responsible for the construction of the estate. Together with five further building projects, the Horseshoe Estate was inscribed as part of the Berlin Modernism Housing Estates World Heritage Site in 2008. The heritage protected part of the Hufeisensiedlung, which was built between 1925 and 1930, extends over a total of six building sections and an area of around 29 hectares. It consists of 1,285 flats, which are in three-storey buildings aligned with the street, and 679 terraced houses, each with a garden and a small terrace. A further, seventh building section is not part of the World Heritage Site. It is south-east of the junction between Fritz-Reuter-Allee and Parchimer Allee and was built without the involvement of Bruno Taut.

== Architectural details and variations ==
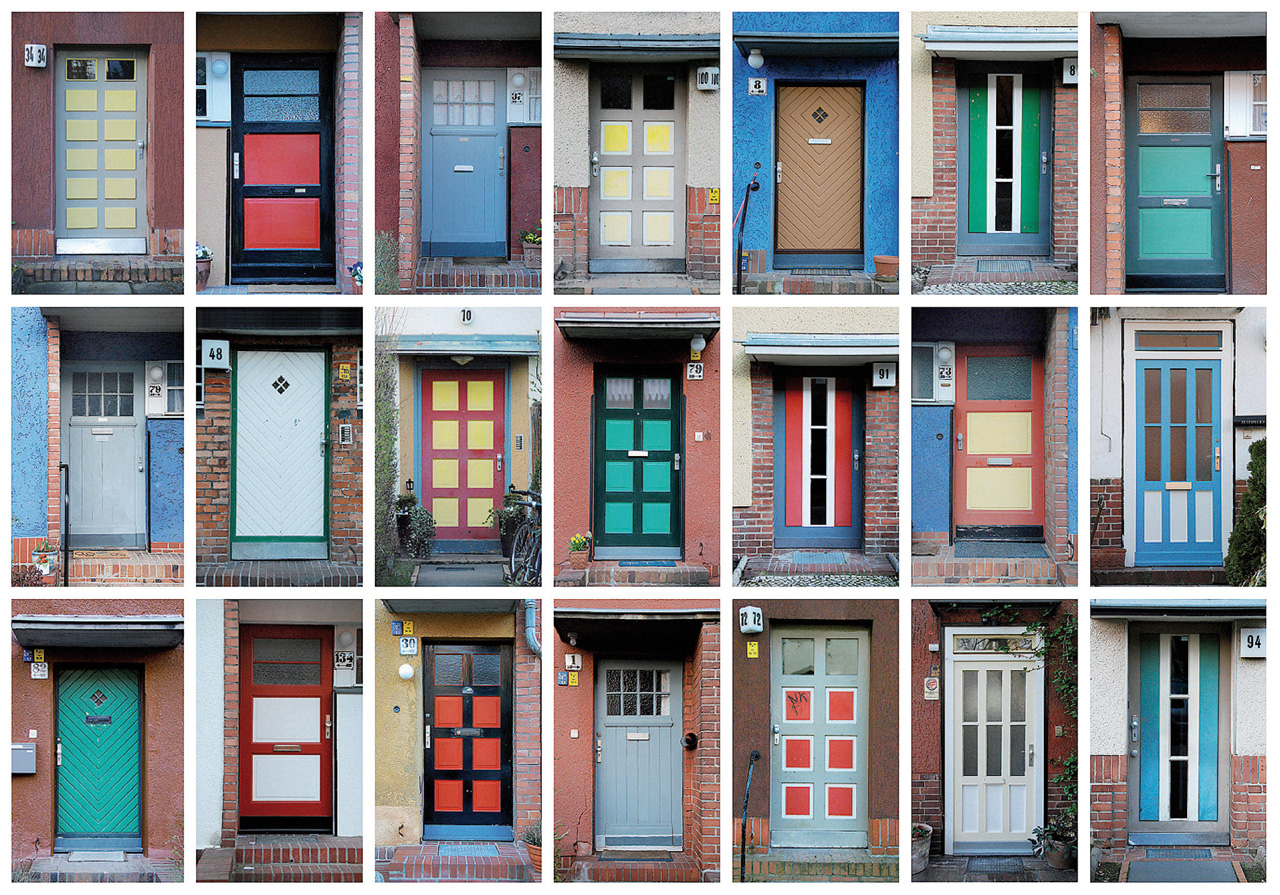
Color variations of doors and entrances – a typical design pattern of Bruno Taut

Closely linked to the heart of Berlin, the development combines a unique architectural style with the social ideal of a terraced garden home for everyone. Hufeisen is the German term for horseshoe, which describes the shape of the curved 350-meter long structure which gave name to the project. It consists of 25 housing units joined together around a pond that dates back to the ice age. The central building structure is surrounded by townhouses and embedded in a suburb that feels urban and rural at the same time.

The facades of the terraced houses are painted in dark red, yellow ochre and – especially at the end of a terraced row – in deep blue or gleaming white. Doors and windows and individual building elements of the blocks of flats like loggias, stairwells or low-ceilinged attic floors are painted to contrast clearly with the facades. The front and rear sections are often designed in separate colour combinations. Further contrasts in material and colour are created by the use of bright red and yellow clinker bricks in the area of the chimneys, the entrances and the base of the walls. Perhaps the most striking design feature is the construction and colour of the entrance doors.

== Basic facilities, interior design and special offers ==
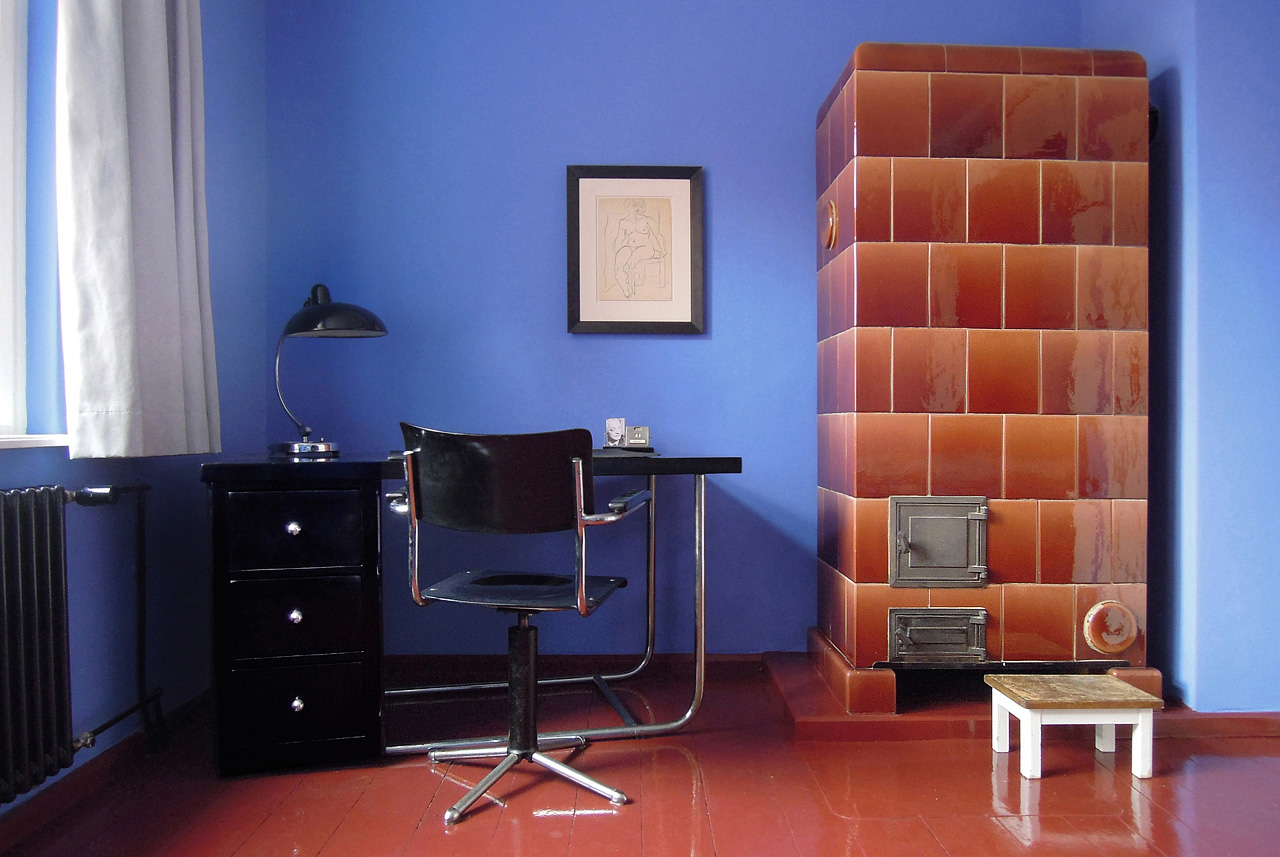
Authentic interior design and coloring of the private accommodation "Tautes Heim“

The houses and flats of the Horseshoe Estate were left unfurnished. All residential units had a bathroom and kitchen as well as a separate bedroom. This standard was revolutionary at the time and meant that the estate was very desirable amongst the people of Berlin. However, the technical facilities were not comparable to the standards of today. Only a few houses in the sixth section had central heating. Instead, coal ovens with glazed tiles in attractive colours were installed in every living room and bedroom. In the kitchen there was a sink, a gas cooker with two burners, a larder beneath the window and in the corner of the kitchen or to one side of the loggia a built-in cupboard. There were coal-fired water heaters in the bathrooms, a toilet and a bathtub. Today most of these original parts of the interior facilities are gone.

Like so many architects, Bruno Taut did not want the rooms with their carefully chosen colours to be covered up or cluttered by inappropriate furnishings. He wanted the residents of his buildings to dispense with pictures, paraphernalia and things that just gather dust. But instead of wanting to convert the residents to the Bauhaus-type tubular steel furniture which was very up-and-coming at the time, he made suggestions about how typical furnishings could be improved by simplifying and removing things. Nevertheless, the expression “to taut one’s flat” soon become a byword amongst fashion-conscious people and, in a rather imprecise way, it combined both these approaches to interior design.

== Planners ==
The Horseshoe Estate is strongly associated with Bruno Taut (1880–1938). Taut was not only the chief architect of the Horseshoe Estate, but also acted as the chief architect of the public utility housing enterprise GEHAG, was part of the Deutscher Werkbund and had an influence on the architecture of the Neues Bauen movement in Berlin. Four out of six estates that gained the UNESCO World Heritage site were developed under his leadership.

Bruno Taut was accompanied by Martin Wagner (1885–1957), who acted as a political organiser and networker and is regarded as a key figure in the construction of Berlin's housing estates. He initiated the founding of GEHAG (a non-profit building society and housing cooperative), was a co-founder of the Deutsche Bauhütte and the director of various professional associations. Initially responsible as the second architect for the Stavenhagener Straße section of the Horseshoe Estate, Martin Wagner was appointed in 1926 to the position of city planning director of Greater Berlin, which had been created in 1920.

Taut and Wagner were supported by Leberecht Migge (1881–1935), a freelance landscape architect who was a proponent of social and nature-oriented garden design and who drew the first designs for the green and open spaces of the Horseshoe Estate. However, only some of these designs were implemented by Ottokar Wagler, the director of the parks and gardens department in the district of Berlin-Neukölln.

== Maintenance ==
Like most of the other Berlin estates the Horseshoe Estate survived the Second World War relatively undamaged. In the post-war period parts of the plasterwork and the colours were lost and at first they were incorrectly restored. The authorities for the conservation of historic buildings reacted and commissioned expert reports, which were then to serve as the basis for proper maintenance work – a process which continues up to now and that is backed up by a program Nationale Welterbestätten initiated by the Germany Federal Ministry of Transport, Building and Urban Development. The Berlin estates' relatively good condition has a lot to do with the clear ownership structure which existed until the late 1990s. This structure ensured that renovation work was commissioned by one body and often on a large scale. This situation changed when GEHAG was privatised by the Senate in 1998 and when subsequently the 679 terraced houses in the Horseshoe Estate, which up until then had been exclusively let to tenants, were sold off to private individual buyers, so that the conservation of this monument as a homogeneous ensemble is now additionally in the hands of several hundred individual owners.
