= Hermann Beims estate =

Housing estate in Magdeburg, Germany

Coordinates: 52.12384°N 11.8942°E

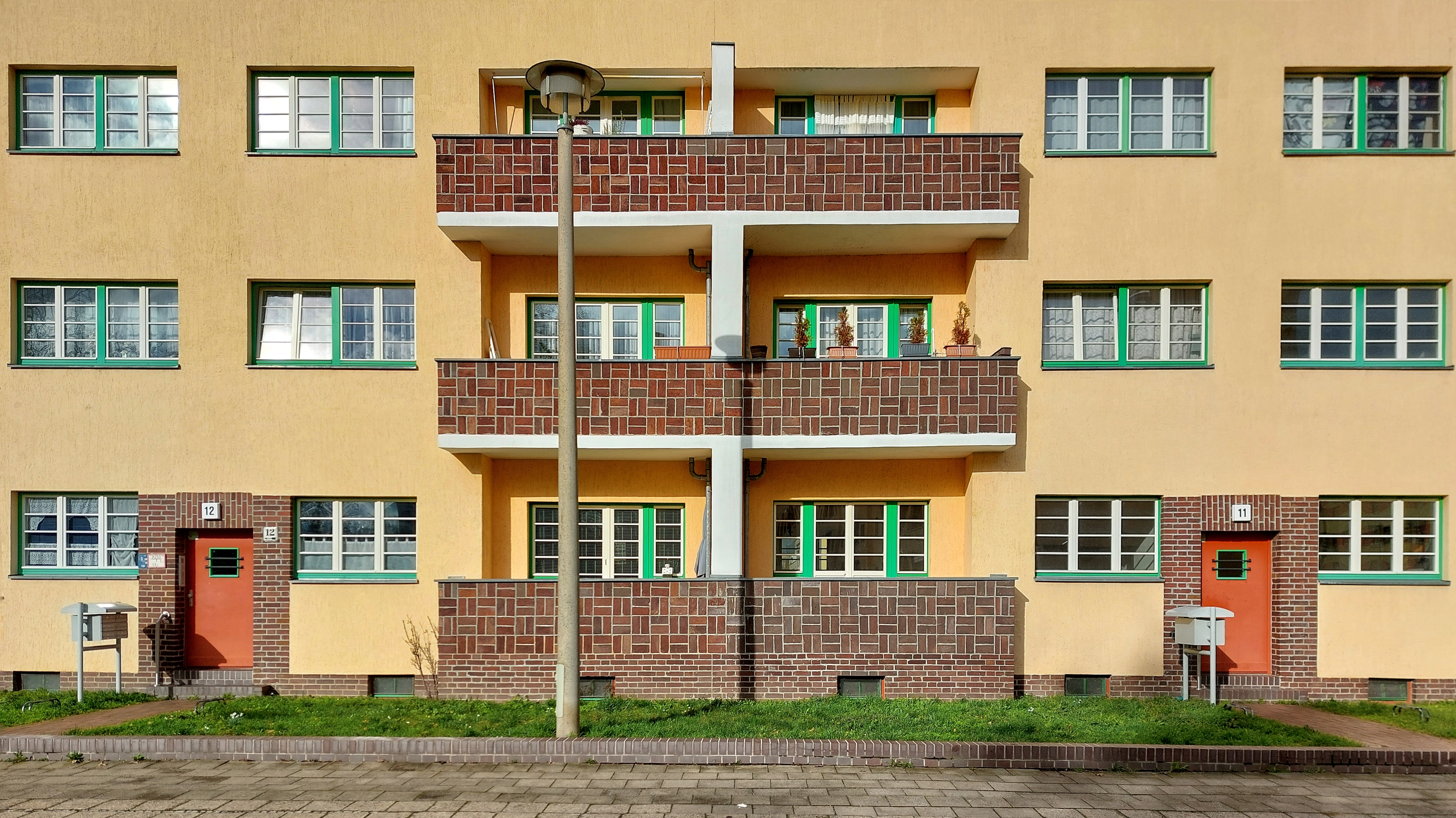
Details of the Hermann-Beims-Siedlung at the Offleber Straße

The Hermann Beims Estate (German: Hermann-Beims-Siedlung) is a social housing project of the 1920s in Magdeburg, Germany. It is named after Hermann Beims (1863–1931), mayor of Magdeburg, who held office from 1919 until 1931. It was designed by Bruno Taut, Magdeburg's city architect between 1926 and 1929.

== Bibliography ==
- Folkhard Cremer, Dehio, Handbuch der Deutschen Kunstdenkmäler, Sachsen-Anhalt I, Regierungsbezirk Magdeburg, Deutscher Kunstverlag, München/Berlin 2002, pp.618 f. ISBN 3422030697
- Sabine Ullrich, Magdeburger Kasernen, Landeshauptstadt Magdeburg, Stadtplanungsamt 2002, pp.165 ff.
- Denkmalverzeichnis Sachsen-Anhalt, Band 14, Landeshauptstadt Magdeburg, Landesamt für Denkmalpflege und Archäologie Sachsen-Anhalt, Michael Imhof Verlag, Petersberg 2009, pp.102 f. ISBN 9783865685315
