= Berlin Modernism Housing Estates =

Subsidised housing estates

UNESCO World Heritage Site
- Location within Berlin Location within Germany
- Location: Berlin, Germany
- Criteria: Cultural: ii, iv
- Reference: 1239
- Inscription: 2008 (32nd Session)
- Extensions: 2026
- Area: 88.1 ha (218 acres)
- Buffer zone: 258.5 ha (639 acres)
- Berlin Modernism Housing Estates

The Berlin Modernism Housing Estates (German: Siedlungen der Berliner Moderne) is a World Heritage Site designated in 2008, comprising seven separate subsidized housing estates in Berlin. Dating mainly from the years of the Weimar Republic (1919–1933), when the city of Berlin was particularly progressive socially, politically and culturally, they are outstanding examples of the building reform movement that contributed to improving housing and living conditions for people with low incomes through innovative approaches to architecture and urban planning. The estates also provide exceptional examples of new urban and architectural typologies, featuring fresh design solutions, as well as technical and aesthetic innovations. Waldsiedlung Zehlendorf was inscribed as an extension of the existing site in 2026.

Bruno Taut, Martin Wagner and Walter Gropius were among the leading architects of these projects which exercised considerable influence on the development of housing around the world.

== List of housing estates ==
Estate	Location	Dates	Planner	Architect	Image
Gartenstadt Falkenberg; Falkenberg Garden City, Tuschkastensiedlung ("Paintbox Estate")	Bohnsdorf; 52°24′39″N 13°34′00″E	1913–1916	Bruno Taut	Bruno Taut; Heinrich Tessenow	
Siedlung Schillerpark	Wedding; 52°33′34″N 13°20′56″E	1924–1930	Bruno Taut	Bruno Taut; Max Taut; Hans Hoffmann (enlargement 1954–1959)	
Großsiedlung Britz; Hufeisensiedlung ("Horseshoe Estate")	Britz; 52°26′54″N 13°27′00″E	1925–1930	Bruno Taut	Bruno Taut; Martin Wagner	
Wohnstadt Carl Legien	Prenzlauer Berg; 52°32′47″N 13°26′01″E	1928–1930	Bruno Taut	Bruno Taut; Franz Hillinger	
Weiße Stadt (White City)	Reinickendorf; 52°34′10″N 13°21′03″E	1929–1931	Otto Rudolf Salvisberg; Martin Wagner (direction)	Otto Rudolf Salvisberg; Bruno Ahrends; Wilhelm Büning	
Großsiedlung Siemensstadt; Ringsiedlung	Charlottenburg-Nord; 52°32′22″N 13°16′39″E	1929–1934	Hans Scharoun; Martin Wagner (direction)	Hans Scharoun; Walter Gropius; Otto Bartning; Fred Forbat; Hugo Häring; Paul Rudolf Henning	
Waldsiedlung Zehlendorf; Onkel Toms Hütte	Zehlendorf; 52°27′00″N 13°15′18″E	1926–1932	Bruno Taut; Otto Rudolf Salvisberg; Hugo Häring (direction)	Ludmilla Herzenstein	

== See also ==
- Bauhaus and its Sites in Weimar, Dessau and Bernau
- New Frankfurt, Frankfurt 1925–1932
- Weissenhof Estate, Stuttgart 1927
