= Adolf Behne =

German critic, art historian, architectural writer and artistic activist

Adolf Bruno Behne
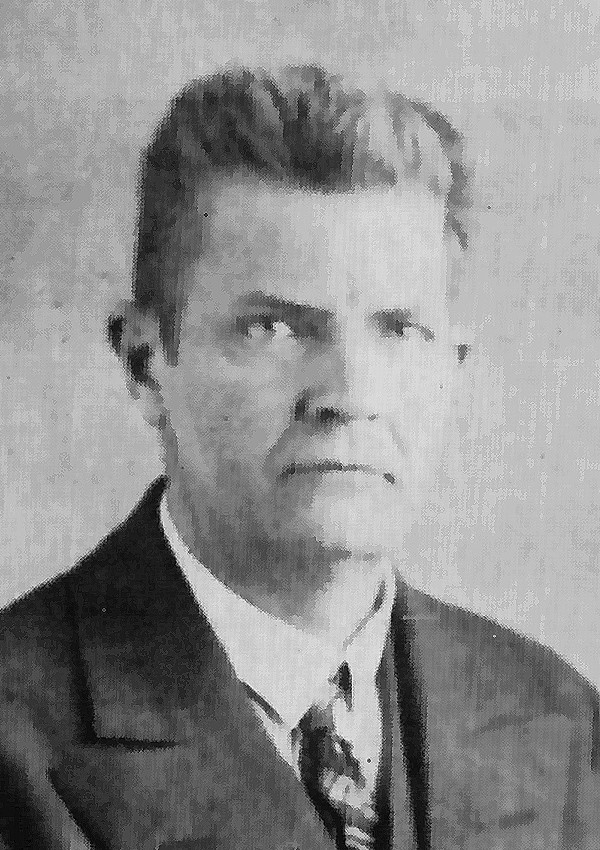
- Born: 13 July 1885; Magdeburg
- Died: 22 August 1948 (aged 63); Berlin
- Occupations: critic, art historian, architectural writer, and artistic activist
- Known for: one of the leaders of the Avant Garde in the Weimar Republic

Adolf Bruno Behne (13 July 1885 – 22 August 1948) was a German critic, art historian, architectural writer, and artistic activist. He was one of the leaders of the Avant Garde in the Weimar Republic.

Behne was born in Magdeburg and studied architecture briefly, then the history of art in Berlin. He joined the Deutscher Werkbund and was a guiding light of the Arbeitsrat für Kunst in 1918. In a 1913 critique of Bruno Taut, Behne helped coin the term "Expressionist architecture", and soon became one of the leading promoters of expressionism. He was close to the members of the Magdeburg artist collective 'The ball' and demanded the creation of a new closeness between art and architecture. He was influenced by the writings of Jakob von Uexküll. He taught at the University of Berlin until 1933 when the Nazis banned him from teaching. Between 1945 and 1948 he was a professor at the National University for Fine Arts, (Staatlichen Hochschule für Bildende Kunst Berlin) and belonged to the architect group Der Ring.

As an architect he rarely had his projects executed. However, between 1932 and 1936 he built the reception building of the main station in Düsseldorf.

He died in Berlin. His hometown of Magdeburg named a street after him (Behneweg).

== Selected Literature ==
- Behne, Adolf 1913. Bruno Taut. Pan 3(23) (7 March 1913): 538–540.
- Behne, Adolf 1914–1915. Biologie und Kubismus. Der Sturm 5(11/12), 68–71.
- Behne, Adolf 1919. Die Wiederkehr der Kunst. Kurt Wolff, Leipzig. Reprint: Kraus, Nendeln/Liechtenstein, 1973; Gebr. Mann, Berlin, 1998.
- Behne, Adolf 1926. Der moderne Zweckbau. Drei Masken Verlag, Vienna/Berlin. Reprint: Der moderne Zweckbau. Ullstein Bauwelt Fundamente, Frankfurt am Main / Berlin, 1964; and Gebr. Mann Verlag, Berlin 1998. Translated as Modern Functional Building, ed. & intro. Rosemarie H. Bletter. Getty, Oxford UP, Santa Monica, 1996.
- Behne, Adolf 1927. Neues Wohnen – Neues Bauen. Hesse & Becker, Leipzig.
- Behne, Adolf 1928. Eine Stunde Architektur. Stuttgart. Neuausgabe Berlin 1984
- Behne, Adolf 1994. Architekturkritik in der Zeit und über die Zeit hinaus: Texte 1913 – 1946. Herausgegeben von Haila Ochs. Basel, Boston, Berlin: Birkhäuser-Architektur-Bibliothek.
- Behne, Adolf 1998. Schriften zur Kunst. Ed. & postscript Cornelia Briel. Berlin: Gebr. Mann.
- Bohm, Arnd 1993. Artful Reproduction: Benjamin's Appropriation of Adolf Behne's `Das reproduktive Zeitalter' in the Kunstwerk Essay. The Germanic Review 68(4): 146–155.
- Bushart, Magdalena, ed. 2000. Adolf Behne. Essays zu seiner Kunst- und Architektur-Kritik. Berlin: Gebr. Mann.
- Gutschow, Kai Konstanty 2005. "The culture of criticism: Adolf Behne and the development of modern architecture in Germany, 1910–1914." Ph.D. diss., Columbia University.
- Lindner, Bernd 1992. 'Auf diesen Berg...' Adolf Behne – Vermitter der Moderne. In: Avantgarde und Publikum. Zur Rezeption avantgardistischer Kunst in Deutschland 1905–1933, ed. Henrike Junge. Cologne, Weimar, Vienna: Böhlau, pp. 7–15.
- Mertins, Detlef 1997. Transparencies Yet to Come: Sigfried Giedion and Adolf Behne. A + U 10(325) (Oct. 1997): 3–17.
- Schwartz, Frederic J. 1998. Form Follows Fetish: Adolf Behne and the Problem of Sachlichkeit. Oxford Art Journal 21(2): 45–77.
