= Martin Wagner (architect) =

German architect, city planner, and author

Martin Wagner (1885–1957) was a German architect, urban planner, and author, best known for the construction of Berlin Modernism Housing Estates in the interwar period.

== Personal life ==
Wagner took American citizenship in 1944. His son, Bernard also became an architect.

== Berlin ==
Wagner was educated at the Technische Hochschule in Charlottenburg (now the Technische Universität Berlin) and worked as a draftsman in the office of the Berlin city planner Hermann Muthesius before being appointed city building commissioner for Schöneberg in 1918.

In 1923, Wagner gave a speech to expert representatives of the building industry at a voluntary socialisation commission meeting convened by the president of the housing association of greater Berlin at the National Union of Building Workers congress at Weimar. Wagner argued that productivity could not be optimised in the private sector as employees had litte stake in the outcome of their work but at the same time, he disagreed with the total nationalisation of the building industry.

On November 18, 1926, Wagner became the city planning director (Stadtbaurat) within Berlin’s central building authority.

=== GEHAG ===
Britz Hufeisensiedlung

GEHAG (Germeinnützige Heimstätten Spar und Bau-Aktiengesellschaft), or "Non-profit Housing, Savings, and Construction Joint-Stock Company", was founded in 1924 by German trade unions and the Social Democratic Party under Wagner's leadership.

At this time, there was crowding of Berlin's city centre, growth of businesses in Berlin's outer south-east and recent injection of funds from the United States. The goal of Wagner and others like Ernst May was to make a large-scale effort to mass produce housing with standardized building requirements, rationalized construction practice, and organized industrial suppliers and labor unions while providing a hygienic, and even utopian community.

Between 1910 and 1933, particularly during the period of the Weimar Republic, seven housing estates were built. These estates are now a UNESCO World Heritage Site.

One of Wagner's estates is the Hufeisensiedlung, also called "the horseshoe" because of its U-shaped design around a large central courtyard. Some of its notable architectural and design features include flat roofs, bright colours, tinted glass, and considered green spaces. The landscapes was designed by Leberecht Migge.

=== Departure from Europe ===
As the Nazi party came to power in the early 1930s, Wagner, as a longtime member of the Social Democratic Party (SDP), fell under increasing pressure and suspicion. He was expelled from the Deutscher Werkbund in 1933 and decided to leave Germany. He spent three years in Turkey in exile. His work there included the city plan for Ankara, and a brief reunion with a colleague Bruno Taut.

== United States ==
Having had his immigration to the United States assisted by his colleague, Walter Gropius, in 1938, Wagner took a position teaching city planning at the Harvard Graduate School of Design. Among Wagner's students at the school were William Wurster and Catherine Bauer.

Over the following two years, Wagner's relationship with Gropius become strained. Wagner complained that Gropius had abandoned the social principles of modernism and approaching modernism only as a style. Wagner's commitment to modernist ideals is illustrated by his 1944 plan for the city of Boston which called for the complete razing and restructuring of the city's downtown area.

Wagner retired from his position at the Harvard Graduate School in 1951.

== See also ==
- Großsiedlung Siemensstadt
- Britz
- Strandbad Wannsee
