= Griffin Place =

Listed building in Hertfordshire, England

Coordinates: 51.7981°N 0.2017°W

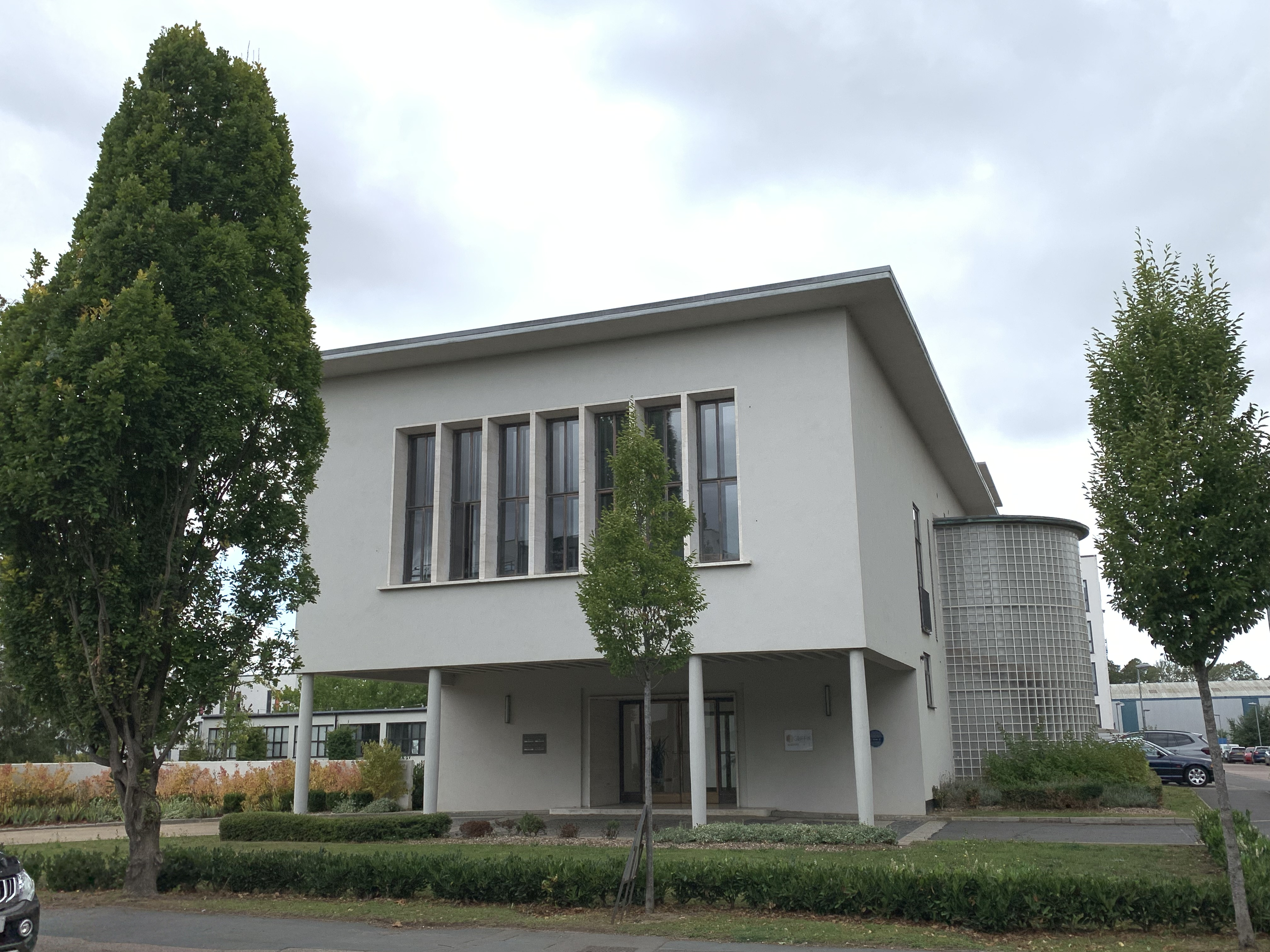
Griffin Place, 40 Broadwater Rd, Welwyn Garden City, AL7 3FD, England

Roche Products Factory (also known as the Roche Building or by its later residential name, Griffin Place) is a former pharmaceutical company headquarters and factory at 40 Broadwater Road, Welwyn Garden City, Hertfordshire, England. It was built in 1938 as the British headquarters, laboratories and factory of Roche Products Limited, the British subsidiary of the Swiss pharmaceutical company Hoffmann-La Roche, and was designed by the Swiss architect Otto Rudolf Salvisberg of Zurich, in association with C. Stanley Brown. It is the only building by Salvisberg in the United Kingdom.

The building was named "Building of the Year" by The Architects' Journal in its issue of 19 January 1939, in a notice by Professor Reilley, who called it the pinnacle of functional, modern architecture. It became a popular destination for visiting architects from Britain and abroad. It has been a Grade II listed building since 1980. After Roche vacated the site in 2005, the original 1938 administration and factory block stood empty for around a decade before being converted into 34 apartments, completed in 2019 under the development name Griffin Place.

== History ==
=== Background and construction ===
Roche's success with synthetic vitamins in the 1930s led the company to commission the Swiss architect Otto Rudolf Salvisberg, already responsible for buildings at Roche's Basel headquarters and in Milan, to design new premises for its British subsidiary.

At the beginning of 1937 Roche's board in Basel signed a 999-year lease on a roughly 20,000-square-metre site at Welwyn Garden City, Hertfordshire, alongside the town's Shredded Wheat factory. By 1935 Roche employed around fifty staff in Britain, and expansion would be enabled by this new site. The building housing the power plant, at the edge of the site, was completed that year. The rest of the complex opened during 1938. With the move, the British company was renamed from the "Hoffmann-La Roche Chemical Works Limited" to "Roche Products Limited". The buildings were built of reinforced concrete, with the factory ranges steel-framed and rendered externally in an off-white colour intended to evoke high standards of hygiene as well as modernity.

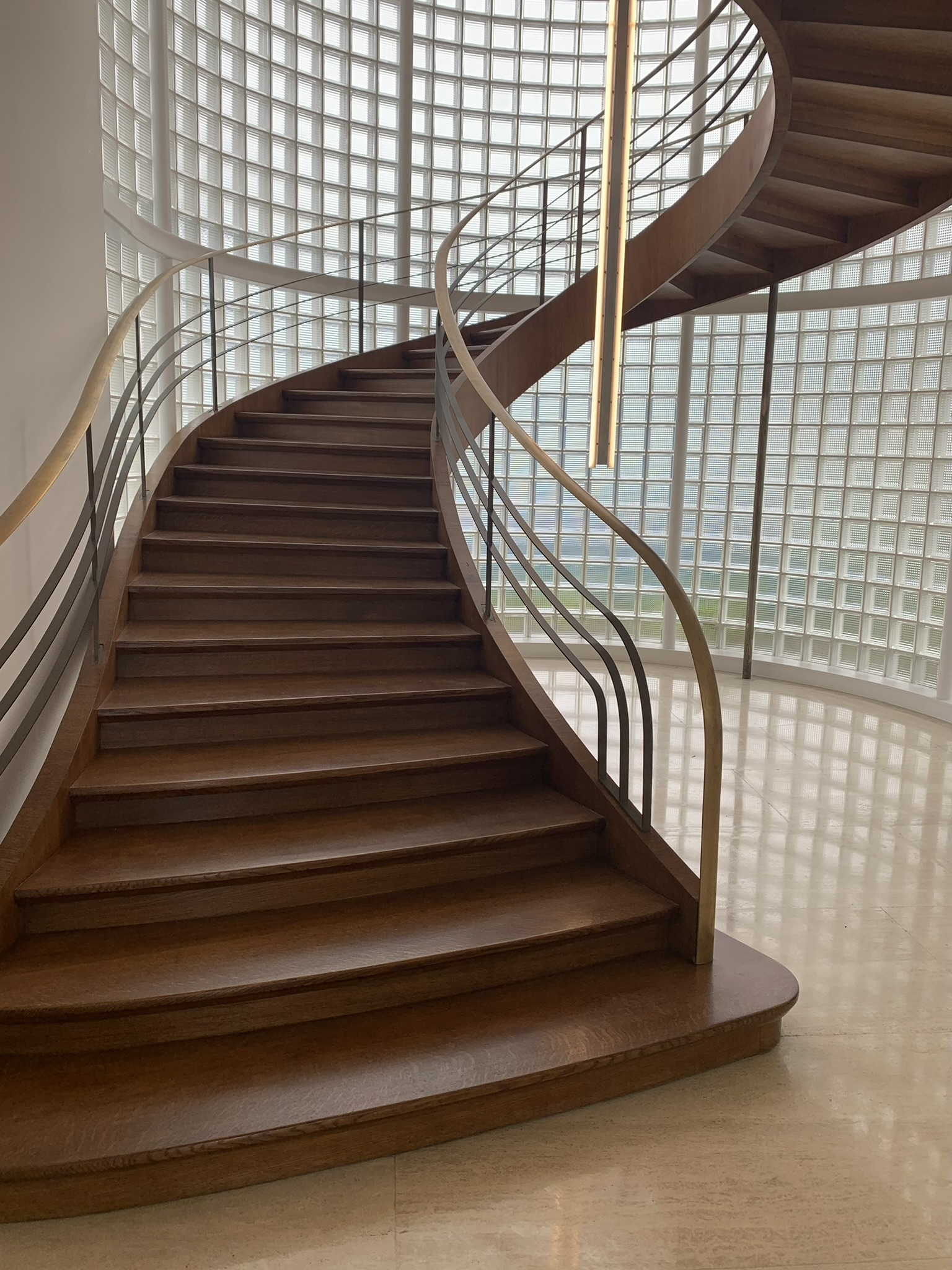
The oak spiral staircase at 40 Broadwater Road, Otto Salvisberg’s design (1938) at Roche Products Ltd., now Griffin Place.

=== Architecture ===
Salvisberg intended the building as a showcase for Roche's modernity, comparable to the company's Basel headquarters, to demonstrate that Roche was a scientifically advanced and hygienic company rather than one of the "dusty old grubby factories" typical of the era. He held that only inferior architects relied on costly materials such as marble or fine wood for effect, and that proportion and natural light alone were sufficient to create pleasant surroundings.

The complex is arranged with a two-storey administration block set on axis with, but in front of, the taller factory ranges behind it. The administration block's entrance is at its short end, with bronze doors set well back behind pilotis and seven narrow, deeply set vertical windows in the wall above. To one side, a glazed drum containing the principal staircase is the only feature to break the otherwise austere, cubic massing of the group. This staircase, a curving flight with a bent-wood balustrade, is described by Roche's own company archivist as encased in a half-circle of glass building blocks for dramatic effect; it became one of the building's best-known internal features. The factory buildings are four storeys with single-storey spurs. Their metal casement windows are Georgian in proportion but set closely together in long horizontal bands, and the widely projecting flat roof further emphasises the horizontality of the design.

Interiors included travertine floors, curved glass-block walls, and a boardroom furnished with a large wall map showing Roche's British sites, made as a mural incorporating the coats of arms of the towns in which Roche operated.

Furnishings included tubular steel chairs and tables supplied by PEL (Practical Equipment Limited), a leading British manufacturer of modern furniture, and a library reading light designed by Salvisberg. The Director's offices were standardised to a single Salvisberg design, including the same desk and floor lamp used in Roche's director's offices worldwide.

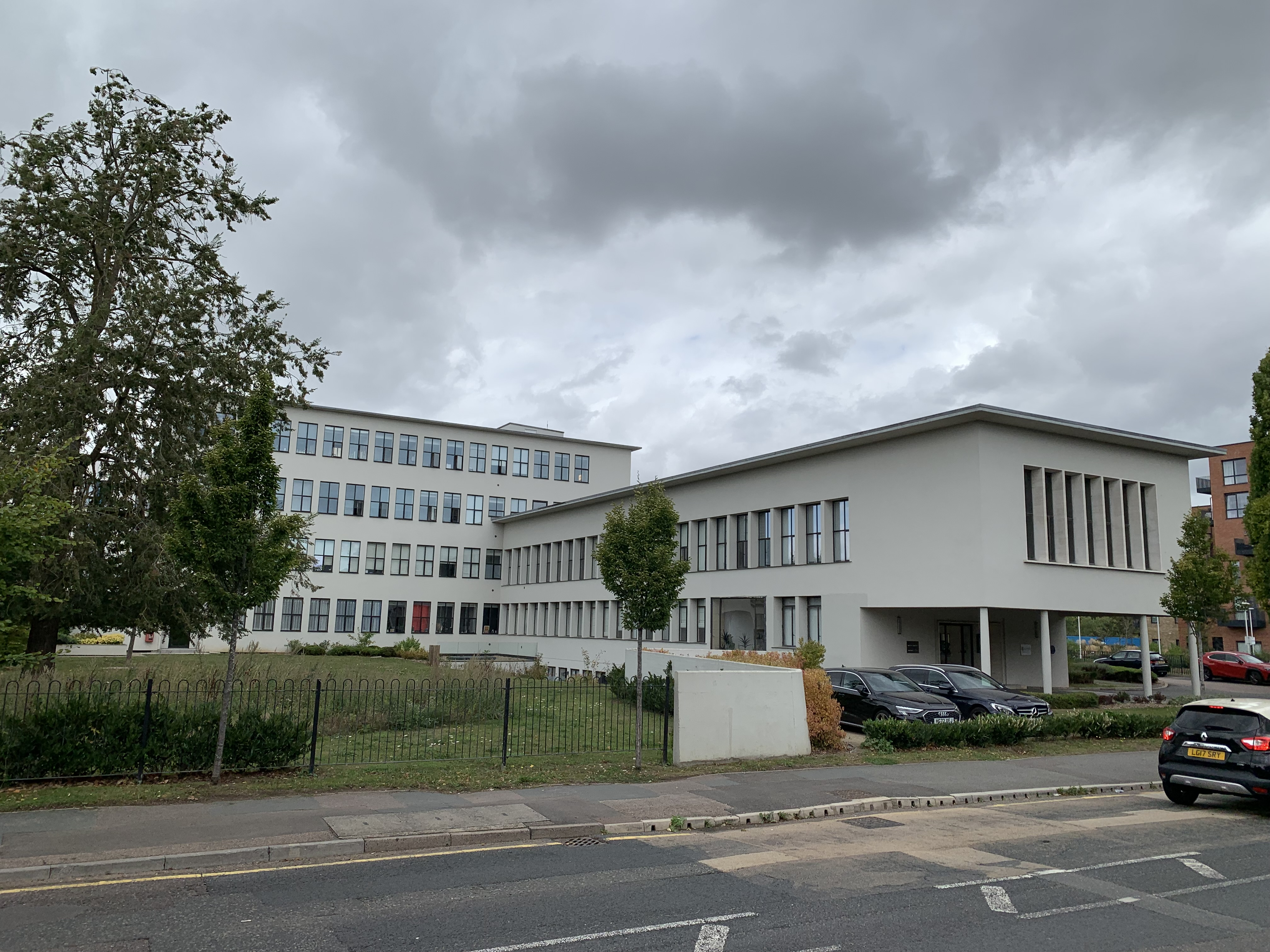
Griffin Place

The scheme was designed in consultation with Louis de Soissons, consultant architect for Welwyn Garden City as a whole, whose approval was required for buildings within the town. Historic England's overview of the town's development describes the resulting factory as light, spacious and reflective of the new town's modern outlook. Roche's own archivist has compared the building to the De La Warr Pavilion in Bexhill-on-Sea, designed by Erich Mendelsohn, a friend of Salvisberg's, as one of the few buildings of comparable scale and modernity in Britain at the time.

=== Second World War ===
On the outbreak of war in September 1939, Roche, Welwyn Garden City, took precautions, filling sandbags and organising staff into a fire brigade and a blackout team, a considerable task given the buildings' large window areas. Surrounding land was turned over to vegetable gardens, and the staff canteen ran its own "pig club". Staff also took part in wartime blood donation drives held at the site. By the 1940s the factory was also packing supplies for the Red Cross. The site's air-raid sirens sounded for the first time on 5 September 1939 and for the last time on 29 March 1945, having been triggered 938 times in total during the war. No bombs fell on the Welwyn Garden City site, and the buildings survived undamaged.

A large number of Roche employees joined the Home Guard as part of the 4th Hertfordshire Battalion, whose headquarters were based at the Roche site. The male fighting company numbered about 100 men, with female staff providing medical aid and catering, and a Lewis machine gun was mounted on the roof of one of the buildings. An assistant maintenance engineer, recalled silver-lined autoclave vessels, morphine capsules manufactured for issue to aircrew (with a Customs and Excise officer permanently stationed on site to control the drugs), and the factory's own electricity generating station.

As Roche's products were considered essential to wartime medicine and nutrition, many of its scientists and workers were classified in reserved occupations and remained at Welwyn Garden City rather than being conscripted.

Wartime shortages had heightened concern over the nutritional value of bread, since much of the vitamin content of whole grain is lost when it is refined into white flour. The Ministry of Food initially tried to persuade consumers to eat wholemeal bread instead, but this proved unpopular, and the solution adopted instead was for millers across Britain to combine white flour with synthetic vitamin B1. After Roche reached an agreement with the Association of British Millers, the company opened what was described as the world's largest vitamin B1 (thiamine) factory at Welwyn Garden City in 1940, supplying the synthetic vitamin used to fortify flour in British bakeries. The site's research department was registered with the Department of Scientific and Industrial Research, with all research activity requiring confirmation from the Ministry of Production, and Roche Welwyn worked closely during the war with the Ministry of Food, the Medical Research Council, the National Institute of Medical Research, the Royal Air Force, the War Office and several universities. Alongside vitamin B1, the site's vitamin C production was also regarded as a strategic asset to the British government during the war.

The company later published an account of its wartime activities, Roche in War-time, 1939–1945: The Record of a British Firm, issued from Welwyn Garden City in 1945 with a cover illustration by Charles Paine.

=== Post-war expansion ===
After the war, Roche extended the site with further buildings that initially matched the style of the original block. By 1946 the Welwyn Garden City site employed around 470 staff. Roche found it difficult to recruit workers to Welwyn Garden City in the post-war years, and purchased houses in the town which it offered to employees as an incentive to remain. In 1977, having outgrown the site again, the company added a large Brutalist office block on the opposite side of Broadwater Road. It was designed by Cubitt, Atkinson and Partners, a successor practice to James Cubitt and Partners, which had designed the intervening post-war extensions. A 1981 amendment to the listing confirms that only the original 1938–40 buildings are of special architectural interest, and that the 1950s additions are excluded.

=== Vacancy and redevelopment ===
Roche used the site for pharmaceutical research, manufacturing and warehousing, as well as for its UK administrative headquarters, until this use ceased around 2009, following the company's 2005 move to a new research building at Shire Park, Welwyn Garden City, designed by Building Design Partnership. The surviving listed building comprises around 3,000 square metres across a basement and three upper floors in a broadly L-shaped plan, on a roughly 0.6-hectare site.

Taylor Wimpey acquired the site and redeveloped the surrounding land, the wider former Roche factory site, for 209 houses and apartments known as the Mirage development. Listed building consent was granted in July 2009 for the partial demolition of the 1950s additions and part of the original single-storey factory range, allowing the retained listed block to be converted to community use. A scheme for 209 dwellings, retaining the listed building for community use, was granted planning permission in 2011. The surrounding redevelopment went ahead, but no occupant was found for the listed building itself, which remained vacant. While the building stood empty, the boardroom's map mural also went missing, and its whereabouts remain unknown.

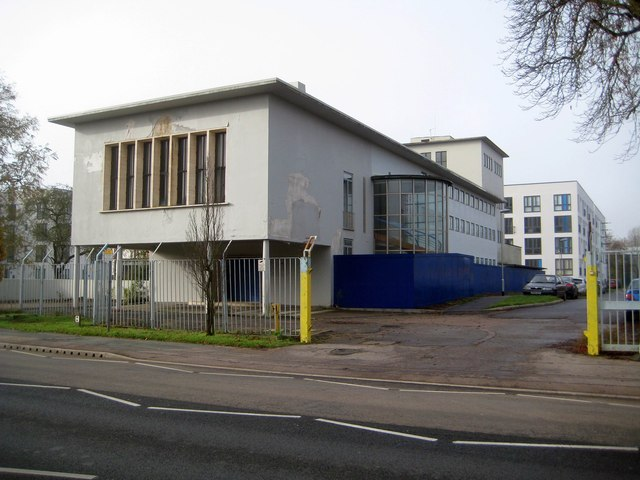
Griffin Place during vacancy

The building was marketed for office or community use from around 2011 without success. A 2016 marketing report found that most enquiries came from residential developers rather than office or community occupiers, and concluded that the building's layout, designed around Roche's specific operational needs, combined with its listed status and limited car parking to make it unlikely to attract commercial tenants. During this period the vacant building attracted vandalism and theft, including the loss of the bronze balustrade to the main staircase, and had to be boarded up.

In September 2016 Taylor Wimpey, through agents Rapleys, submitted applications for planning permission and listed building consent to convert the former factory into 34 residential apartments, 11 one-bedroom and 23 two-bedroom units, including the insertion of five new spiral staircases to create six duplex apartments. Ahead of submission, Taylor Wimpey consulted the Twentieth Century Society, the Welwyn Garden City Heritage Trust and the Welwyn Garden City Society. The Twentieth Century Society's Casework Committee responded that it had no objection in principle, welcomed the sympathetic treatment of the entrance areas and the former directors' offices, and did not consider the basement to be of high significance, though it raised concern about the visual impact of a proposed lightwell on the garden setting. The accompanying heritage assessment identified the building's principal features of special interest as its International Modernist style of simple cubic forms and clean render. The council granted permission later in 2016. The scheme was assessed as causing "less than substantial harm" to the listed building's significance, outweighed by the public benefit of returning a long-vacant heritage asset to use. As part of the process, the Welwyn Garden City Heritage Trust (Later named Together for Welwyn Garden City) arranged for Roche's Basel archive to supply historical photographs for display in the building's communal areas.

=== Current Residential Use ===
Oakbridge Homes acquired the site in 2018 and restored and converted the building, retaining and repairing original features including the spiral staircase, curved glass-block walls and travertine floors, to create 34 one- and two-bedroom apartments and duplex homes, marketed as Griffin Place. The development, situated on Broadwater Road and what is now Otto Road (named after the architect, Otto Rudolf Salvisberg), takes its name from the griffin, the heraldic emblem of Kleinbasel (Lower Basel), a reference to Roche's origins in Basel, Switzerland. Sales of the completed apartments were briefly disrupted by the COVID-19 pandemic, but the scheme subsequently sold out.

== Grade II listing ==
The building was first listed at Grade II on 10 October 1980, with the list entry amended on 1 April 1981 to clarify that the address covers "Office Block (Buildings 1 to 4) to Roche Products Factory" and that the 1950s additions to the site are not of special interest. The list entry number is 1348142, and the National Grid Reference given is TL 24110 12581.

A commemorative plaque mounted at the building’s north side entrance summarises this history for visitors. It records the building’s use as Roche Products’ headquarters from 1938 to 2005, attributes the design to Salvisberg, describes the building as a rare surviving example of pre-war modernist industrial architecture in Britain, notes that it housed the 4th Battalion Home Guard during the Second World War, gives the 1980 listing date, and explains the 2019 renaming to Griffin Place by Oakbridge Homes and the griffin’s significance as a heraldic symbol of Kleinbasel, Basel.

== Archives ==
Original architectural plans and photographs of the Welwyn Garden City buildings are held by Roche's own Historical Collection and Archive in Basel, Switzerland, as part of the company's global historical archive. This material was used by Oakbridge Homes to inform the 2018–2019 restoration and was offered for display in the building's communal areas during the 2016 planning process. A copy of Roche's own 1945 account of its wartime activities is held by the Wellcome Collection in London.
