= Council Offices, Welwyn Garden City =

Municipal building in Welwyn Garden City, Hertfordshire, England

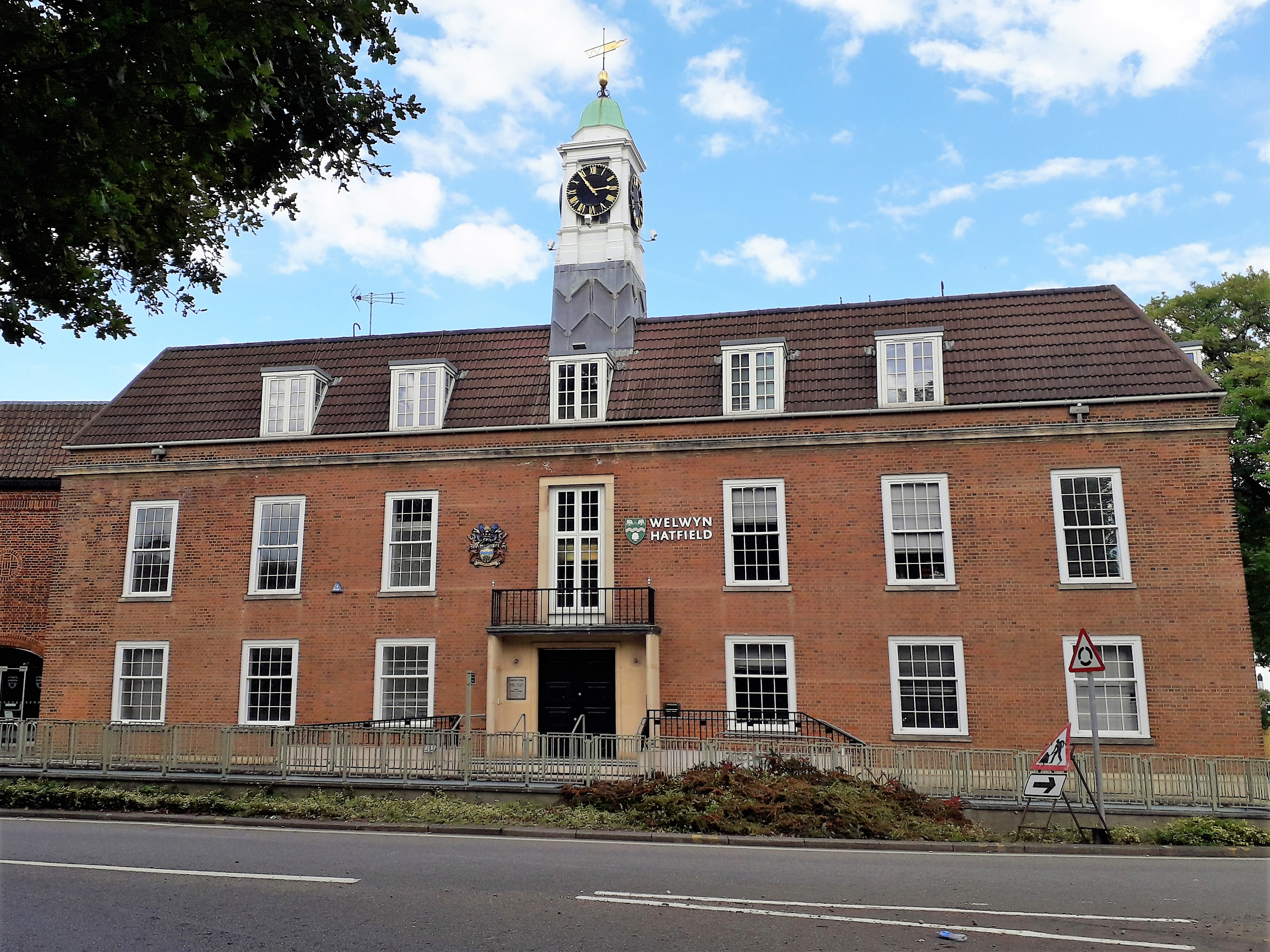
- Council Offices, Welwyn Garden City

- Shown in Hertfordshire
- 51.8041°N 0.2055°W
- Location: The Campus, Welwyn Garden City

History
- Built: 1937

Site notes
- Architect: Cecil Harry Elsom
- Architectural style: Neo-Georgian style

The Council Offices, also known as the Welwyn Hatfield Borough Council Offices, is a municipal building on The Campus in Welwyn Garden City, Hertfordshire, England. The structure accommodates the offices and meeting place of Welwyn Hatfield Borough Council.

== History ==
After Sir Ebenezer Howard initiated the development of a garden city at a site a mile south of the village of Welwyn in 1920, the Canadian town planner, Louis de Soissons, was asked to prepare a masterplan for the area. That masterplan envisaged a long boulevard on a north–south axis with a semi-circular green, which would be known as The Campus, at the north end. After the parish of Welwyn Garden City was made an urban district on 1 April 1927, making it independent of the Welwyn Rural District Council, the new civic leaders decided to commission a civic complex around The Campus. The new council offices were designed by Cecil Harry Elsom in the Neo-Georgian style, built in red brick and were officially opened on 6 January 1937.

The complex also included a fire station, erected immediately to the southeast, of the council offices, and a new public library equipped with 18,000 books, although the library service relocated to Guessens Road in autumn 1939.

The design involved a symmetrical main frontage of seven bays facing onto The Campus. The central bay featured a square headed doorway with an architrave and a wide stone surround flanked by stone piers supporting a balcony with iron railings and finials. There was a French door, which allowed access to the balcony, in the central bay on the first floor. The other bays were fenestrated by sash windows on both floors and, projecting from the hipped roof, there were five flat roofed dormer windows. There was also a central clock tower with an ogee-shaped roof and a weather vane. Internally, the principal room was the council chamber on the first floor.

During the Second World War, air raid wardens were posted on the roof to watch out for incendiary bombs. The building continued to serve as the offices of the urban district council for much of the 20th century, and then became the headquarters of the enlarged Welwyn Hatfield District Council when it was formed in 1974. After the fire service moved to Bridge Road East in 1978, the council offices were extended to the southeast and to the north. The council chamber was refurbished by Borras Construction at a cost of £712,000, to a design by RPS Group, in 2016.
