= Otto Rudolf Salvisberg =

Swiss architect

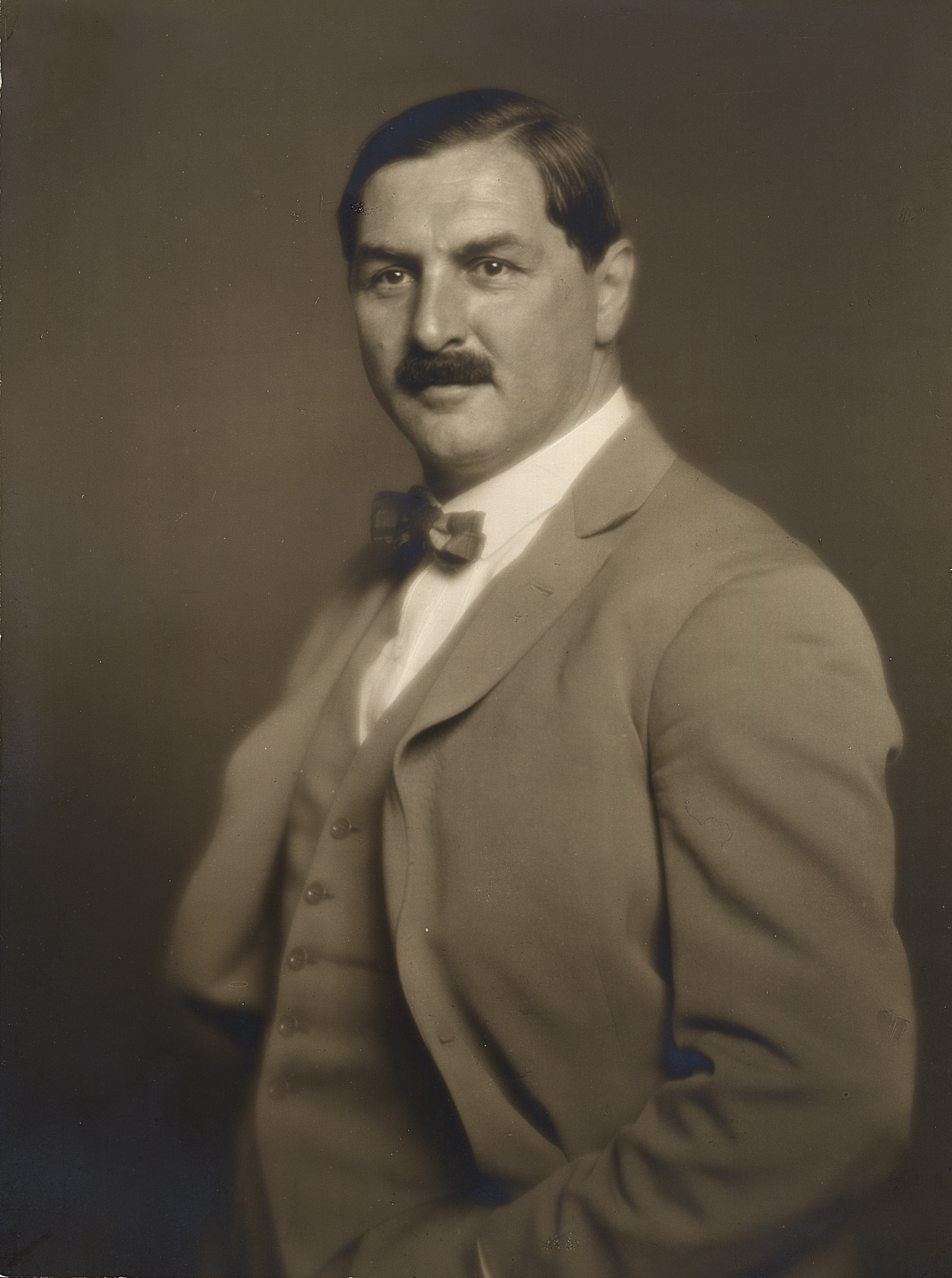
Otto Rudolf Salvisberg, 1931

Otto Rudolf Salvisberg (19 October 1882, Köniz – 23 December 1940, Arosa) was a Swiss architect.

Between 1905 and 1930 Salvisberg worked in Germany. He worked with Bruno Ahrends and Wilhelm Büning to design the "White City" housing settlement in Berlin.

== Biography ==
After completing his apprenticeship as a building draughtsman, Salvisberg attended the School of Architecture at the Technicum in Biel/Bienne in 1901, which he graduated from in 1904 with honors. Subsequently, he traveled through southern Germany to Munich. In Munich, Salvisberg attended courses at the Technical University of Munich, where August Thiersch, Friedrich von Thiersch, and Karl Hocheder were teaching. Presumably in 1905, he continued his journey to Karlsruhe. In addition to his employment at the architectural firm Curjel & Moser in Karlsruhe, he studied at the Technical University of Karlsruhe under the guidance of Carl Schäfer.

From 1930, Salvisberg taught as a professor at the Swiss Federal Institute of Technology in Zurich, where he built the district heating plant and mechanical engineering laboratory until 1934. In 1938, he spent some time in Turkey. In the 1930s, Salvisberg was the in-house architect for the pharmaceutical company Hoffmann-La Roche AG, designing the development plan and many buildings at the headquarters in Basel as well as numerous buildings for the subsidiaries around the world.

== Buildings and Designs ==
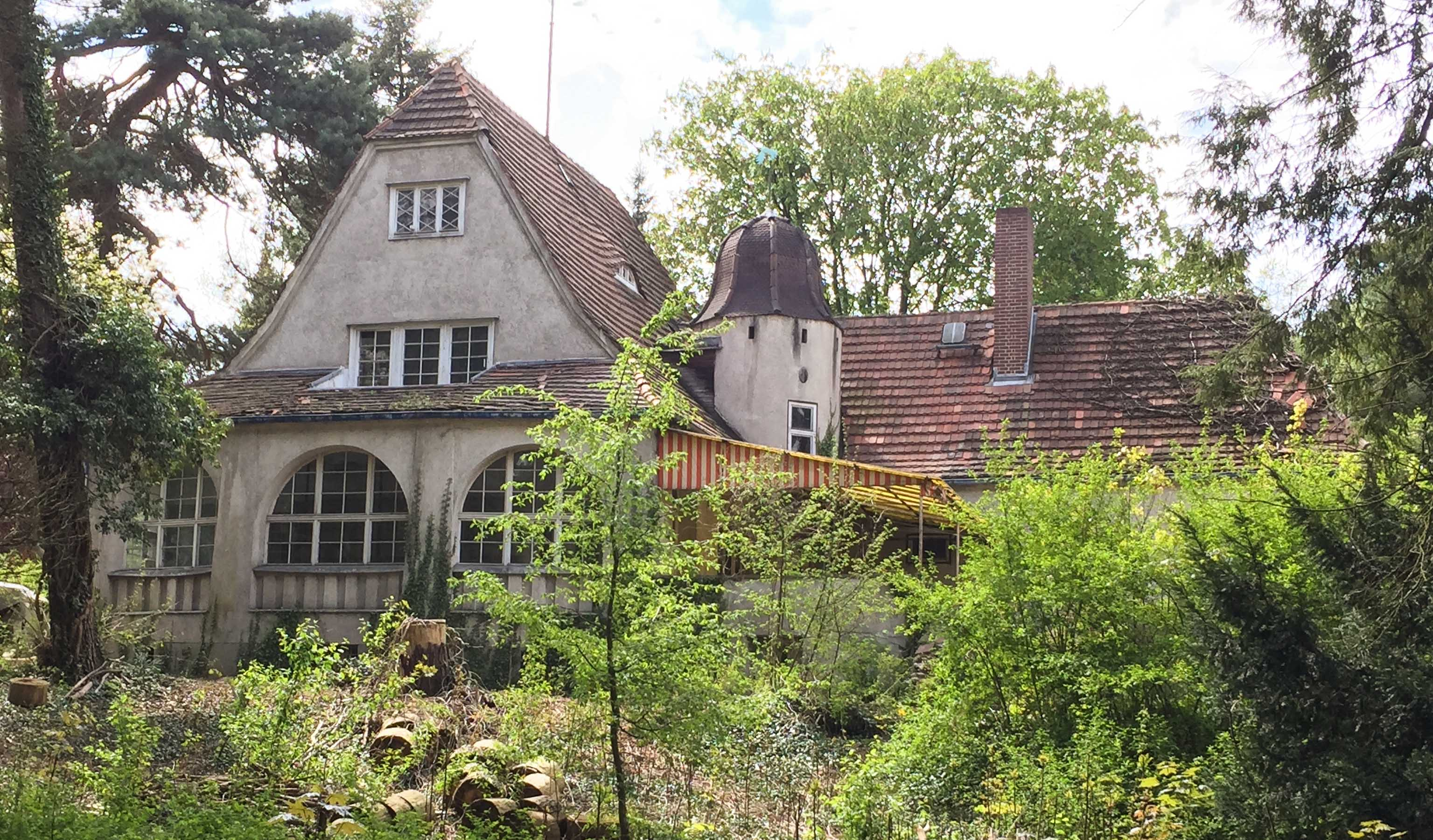
Haus Winkler in Berlin-Frohnau, built in 1911 (photo taken in 2015, before renovation).

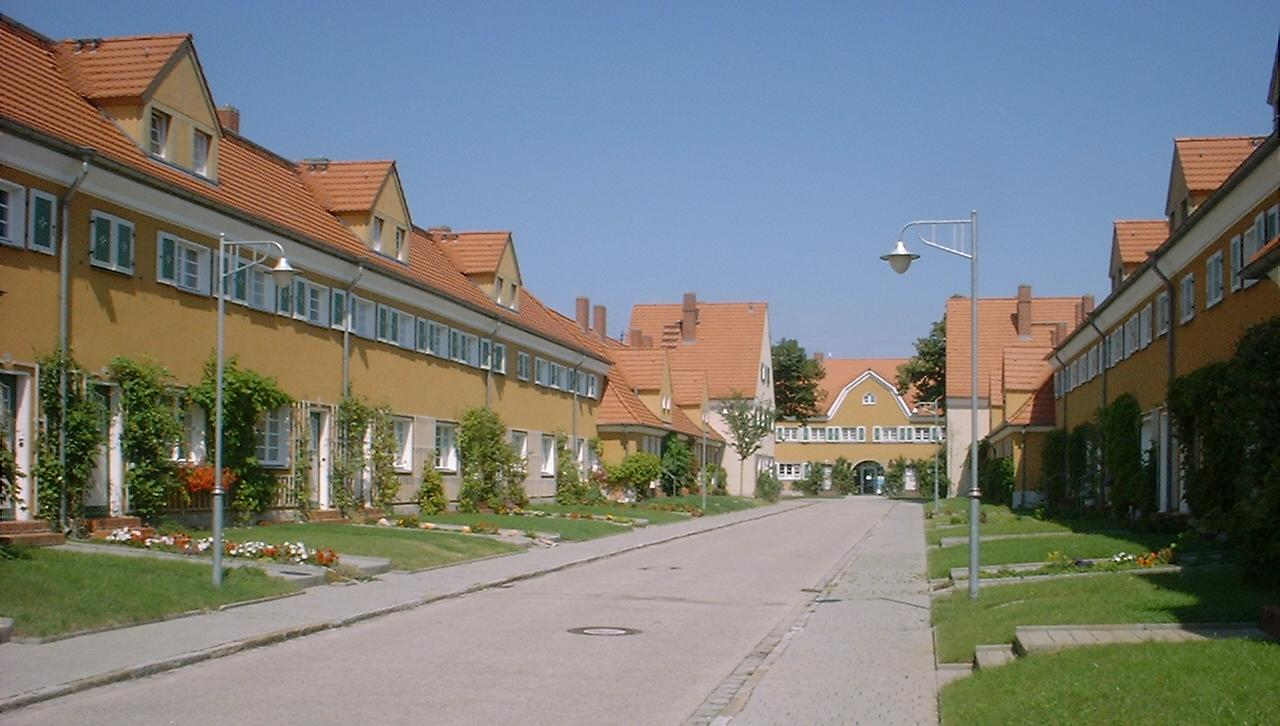
Piesteritz factory settlement, view of the Steintor.

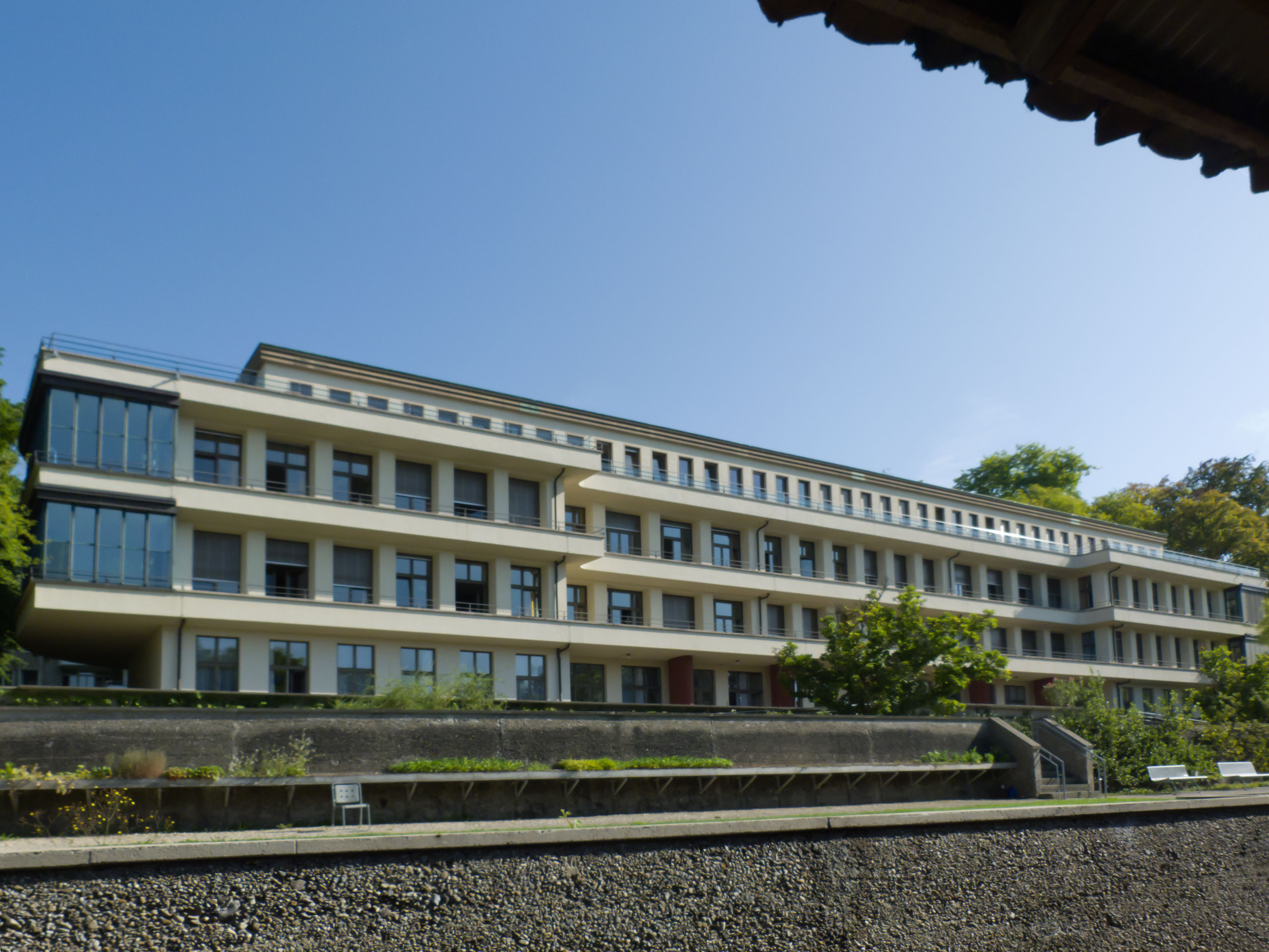
Lory Hospital in Bern, built between 1926 and 1929.

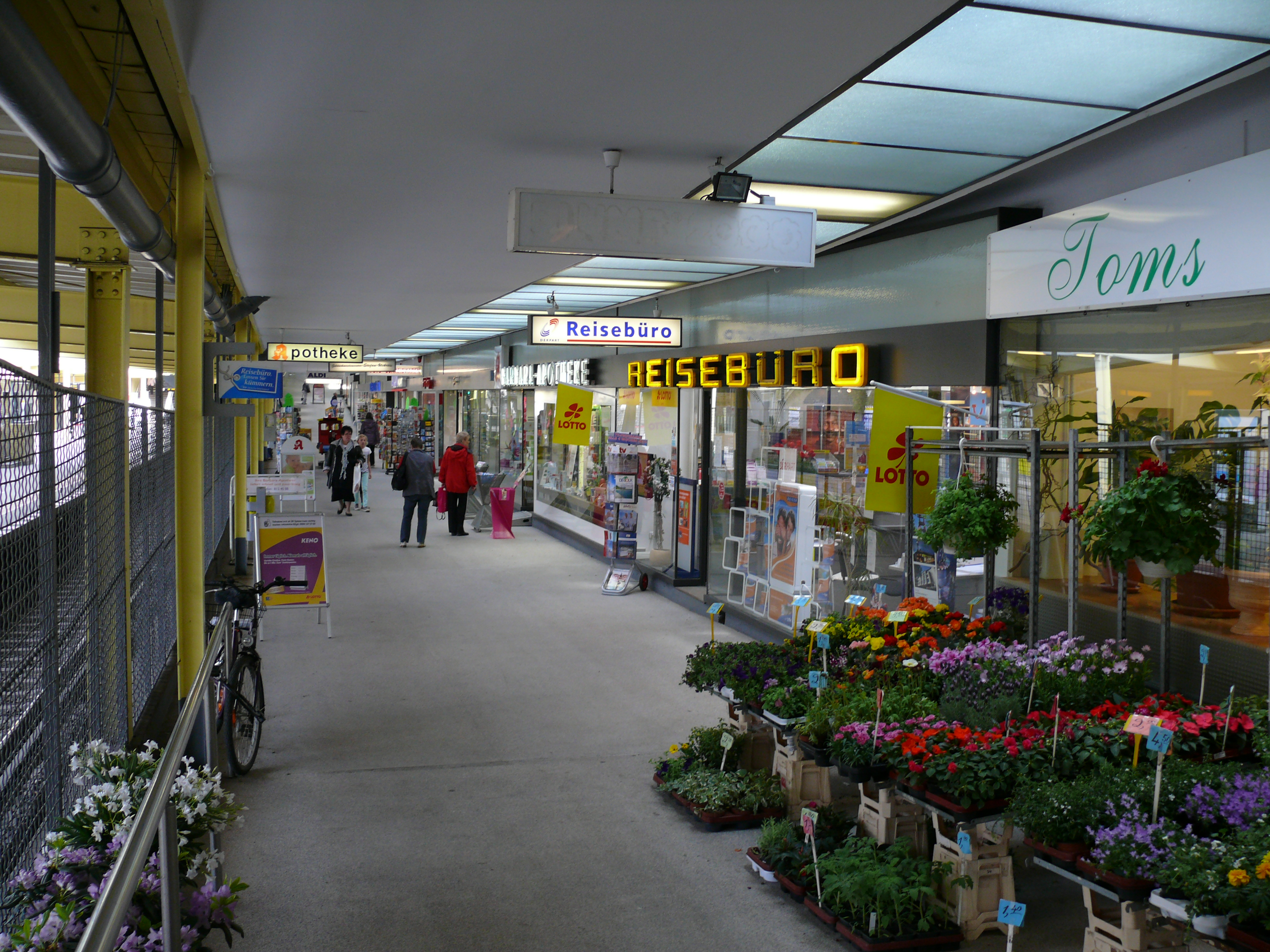
Shopping arcade in the subway station.

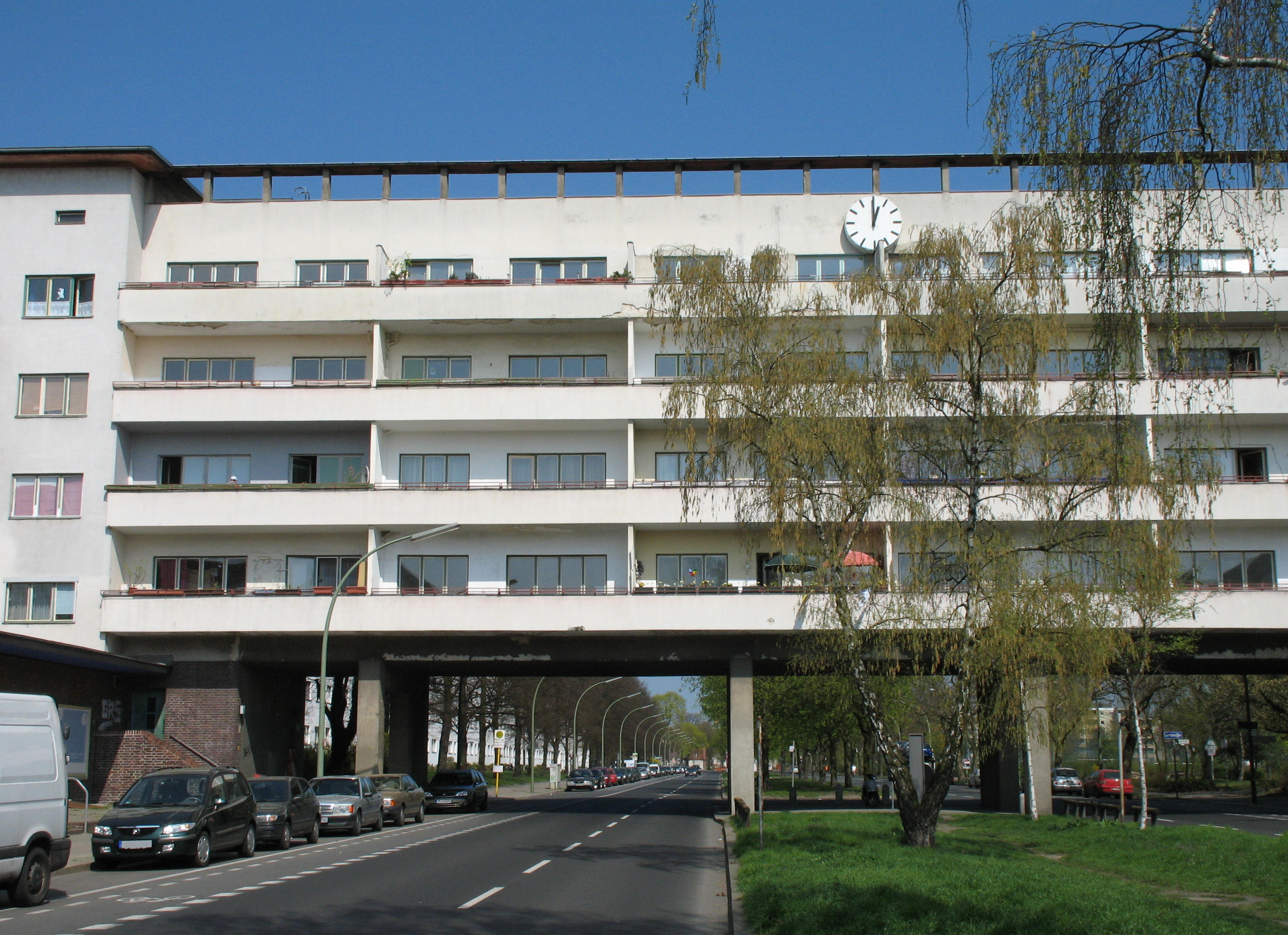
House with a balcony in the "White City", Berlin-Reinickendorf.

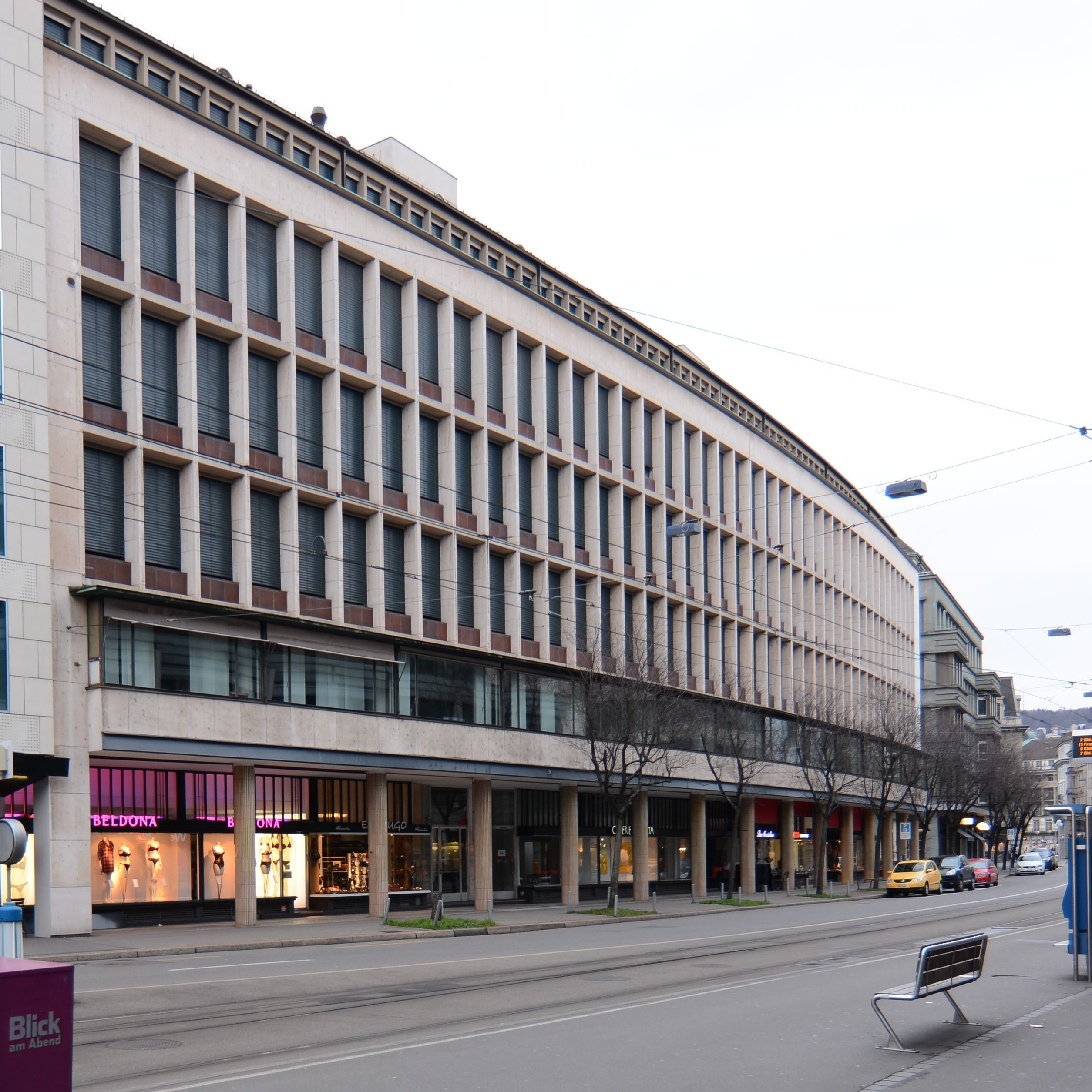
Bleicherhof Zurich, built in 1940.

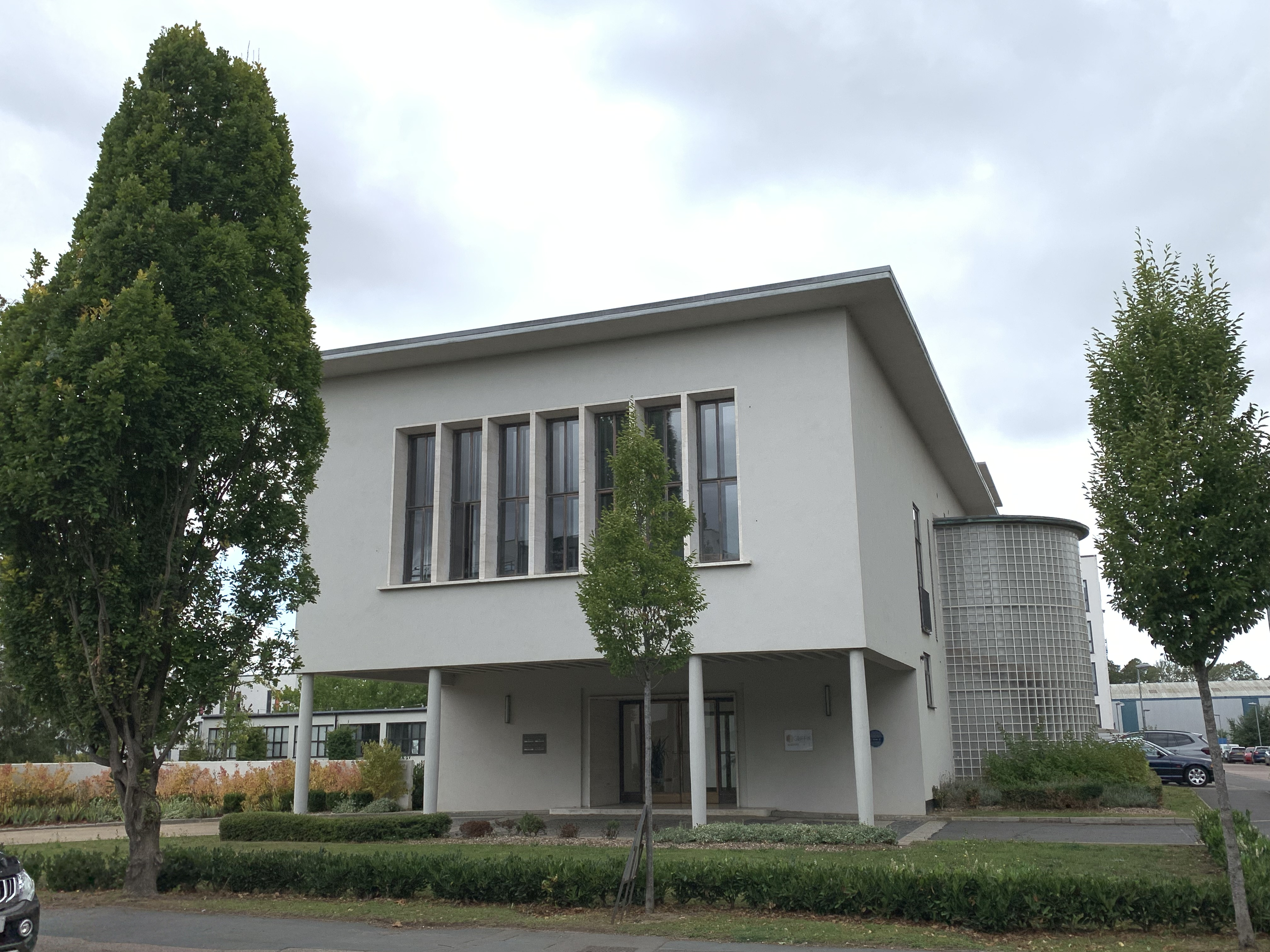
Former Headquarters of Roche in the United Kingdom, Welwyn Garden City, build in 1937.

- 1910: Competition design for a Bismarck national monument on the Elisenhöhe near Bingerbrück (together with Paul Zimmerreimer and the sculptor Paul Rudolf Henning; not awarded).
- 1911: Haus Winkler in Berlin-Frohnau, Frohnauer Straße 144a. Renovated 2018–2020.
- 1912: Apartment building Hohenzollerndamm 87 / Egerstraße 12 in Berlin-Schmargendorf.
- 1912: Landhaus Neutze in Berlin-Dahlem, Drosselweg 3.
- 1912–1913: Office and commercial building Lindenhaus in Berlin-Kreuzberg, Lindenstraße 38 / Oranienstraße 98–98a (in the office of Paul Zimmereimer; demolished in 1965).
- 1912: Conversion of the commercial and office building at Jägerstraße 58 in Berlin-Mitte into the Ballhaus Bal Tabarin
- before 1914: C. Prächtel commercial building in Berlin, Schützenstraße.
- 1916–1919: Factory settlement of the nitrogen works Piesteritz near Wittenberg (with Paul Schmitthenner).
- 1917: Design for the expansion of the garden city Staaken
- 1918–1929: Elsengrund settlement in Berlin-Köpenick
- 1919: Landhaus Richter in Berlin-Dahlem, Rheinbabenallee 42.
- 1919: House Pohland in Falkenstein/Vogtland.
- around 1919: Suburban settlement in Halle an der Saale.
- around 1920: Settlement in Nauen; settlement in Emden; development plan of the VAW works in Lauta.
- 1920–1921: Weimann Works settlement in Světec.
- 1920–1926: Expansion of the Oberdorstfeld miners' settlement in Dortmund-Dorstfeld.
- 1922: Haus Vogelsang in Berlin-Zehlendorf, Forststraße 41.
- 1922: Schmidt House in Berlin-Zehlendorf, Forststraße 44.
- 1922: own house in Berlin-Südende, Oehlertstraße 13 (today Oehlertring 52/53, destroyed in World War II, demolished).
- from 1922: Multi-family housing complex for the Berlinische Boden-Gesellschaft in Berlin-Wilmersdorf, Triberger Straße 1–10, Aßmannshauser Straße 19–24.
- 1923: House for Paul Rudolf Henning in Berlin-Südende, Bahnstraße 19 (today Buhrowstraße 19).
- 1923–1924: Works settlement of Bayerische Kraftwerke AG (BKW) (becoming Süddeutsche Kalkstickstoff-Werke AG in 1939, SKW Trostberg AG in 1978, and Evonik Degussa GmbH in 2000) in Garching an der Alz (Upper Bavaria).

The “Garden City” (Gartenstadt) with 165 residential units is considered one of the most beautiful workers’ settlements in southern Germany.

- 1923–1924: Tang House in Berlin-Dahlem, upon the Hirschsprung.
- 1923–1924: Summer house Kyser in Werder (Havel).
- 1924–1925: Free rental houses in Berlin-Lichterfelde, Geranienstraße / Begonienplatz.
- 1924–1925: Terraced houses at the Botanischer Garten metropolitan train (S-Bahn) station in Berlin-Lichterfelde.
- 1925: Country house for Johannes Hechler in Potsdam, Tomowstraße 9.
- 1925: Country house for Karl August Geyer in Zeuthen.
- 1925: Country house in Berlin-Wilmersdorf, Johannisberger Straße 35.
- 1925: Competition design for a multi-family residential development on the edge of Tempelhofer Feld in Berlin-Tempelhof
- 1925–1926: Multi-family residential development at Hortensienplatz in Berlin-Lichterfelde; civil servants' housing in Berlin-Lankwitz.
- 1925–1926: Residential building for the German Life Insurance for Wehrmacht members and officials in Berlin-Wilmersdorf, Johannisberger Straße 32–34.
- 1925–1927: Conversion of a factory building for the pharmaceutical factory E. Taeschner in Potsdam, Behlertstraße 29.
- 1926: Apartment building in Berlin-Lichterfelde, Tulpenstraße.
- 1926–1936: Collaboration on the design of the residential complexes and square of the Kreuzkirche church (Berlin-Schmargendorf).
- 1926–1930: Mittelheide suburban housing estate in Berlin-Köpenick (with Rudolph W. Reichel).
- 1926–1929: Lory Hospital; now Inselspital, or University Hospital of Bern.
- 1926–1927: Multi-family residential building in Berlin-Schmargendorf, Doberaner Straße 5/6
- 1926–1928: GEHAG housing estate Uncle Tom's Cabin in Berlin-Zehlendorf (with Bruno Taut and Hugo Häring).
- 1926–1928: Multi-family residential building in Hohenzollerndamm, Berlin-Schmargendorf.
- 1926–1928: Volksbank office building in Solothurn (with Otto Brechbühl).
- before 1927: Bolle House in Berlin-Nikolassee.
- 1927: Invalidendank settlement in Klein-Schönebeck.
- 1927: Country house for Dr. Brunn in Berlin-Wilmersdorf, Binger Straße 53.
- 1927–1928: Factory building for Geyer-Werke AG in Berlin-Neukölln, Harzer Straße 39.
- 1927–1928: Trinity Church in Berlin-Steglitz, Südendstraße 19–21.
- 1927–1930: Residential complex (with Jean Krämer; with Charlottenburg depot) in Berlin-Charlottenburg, Knobelsdorffstraße 94–121.
- 1927: Facade and interior design for a shop of the Scherk perfumery factory in Berlin-Charlottenburg, Kurfürstendamm.
- 1928: Attilahöhe housing estate in Berlin-Tempelhof (with Rudolph W. Reichel).
- 1928: Studio house for Jupp Wiertz in Berlin-Dahlem, Petschkauer Weg.
- 1928: Country house for the Berlin entrepreneur Wilhelm Zoellner at Gudelacksee near Klosterheide (largely altered 1936–1938).
- 1928–1929: Staff House (New General Command) in Wrocław, ul. Gajowicka.
- 1928–1929: Reconstruction of the Penzlin-Tänzer house in Berlin-Dahlem.
- 1928–1930: Parish hall of the Evangelical Matthäusgemeinde in Berlin-Steglitz, Schloßstraße 44.
- 1928–1931: New institute buildings of the University of Bern, Länggassquartier in Bern (with Otto Brechbühl).
- 1928–1931: Part of the large housing estate Schillerpromenade in Berlin-Reinickendorf, better known as the White City (other components by Wilhelm Büning and Bruno Ahrends; open space planning by landscape architect Ludwig Lesser)

In July 2008, the White City was added to the UNESCO World Heritage List as one of the six housing estates of Berlin's Modernism.

- 1929: The "department store steamer" planned by the Wertheim Group in Schloßstraße (Berlin-Steglitz) and designed by Salvisberg, with a covered sun deck as a terrace restaurant and continuous shop window, was not realized due to the global economic crisis.
- 1929: Conversion of a department store into an office and commercial building, so-called “Dierighaus”, in Berlin-Mitte, Spandauer Straße / Kaiser-Wilhelm-Straße (destroyed).
- 1929: Uncle Tom's Cabin subway station, the lobby was designed by Alfred Grenader.
- 1929–1930: Administration building for the German Health Insurance in Berlin-Schöneberg, Innsbrucker Straße 26/27.
- 1929–1930: Residence for the lawyer Julius Flechtheim in Berlin-Grunewal, Douglasstraße 12.
- 1929–1930: Multi-family residential development on Friedrichsruher Straße in Berlin-Steglitz; multi-family residential development on Havensteinstraße in Berlin-Lankwitz
- 1930: Competition design for the bridge “Västerbron” over Lake Mälaren (together with Wilhelm Büning and civil engineer Wilhelm Maelzer; awarded 1st prize)
- 1930–1933: District heating plant and mechanical laboratory of the ETH Zurich.
- 1931: SUVA House in Bern.
- 1931: Cantonal Bernese Infant and Mother Home in Elfenau in Bern (with Otto Brechbühl).
- 1931: own house in Zurich.
- 1932–1936: Extension of the Kunstmuseum Bern (together with Karl Indermühle), largely demolished in 1980 to make way for a new building.
- 1935: Gsell House in Riehen.
- 1935–1936: First Church of Christ, Scientist in Basel.
- 1936: Administration building of Hoffmann-La Roche AG in Basel.
- 1936–1937: Roche Products Ltd factory in Welwyn Garden City, United Kingdom. It became a grade II listed building in 1980. It served as Roche's headquarters in the United Kingdom from 1938 until 2005, and, in 2019, it was converted into an apartment block.
- 1938: Pharmaceutical factory building of Hoffmann-La Roche AG in Basel.
- 1940: Hoffmann-La Roche AG factory building in Basel.
- 1940: “Bleicherhof”, Zurich.
