= Nabisco Shredded Wheat Factory =

Defunct factory in Welwyn Garden City

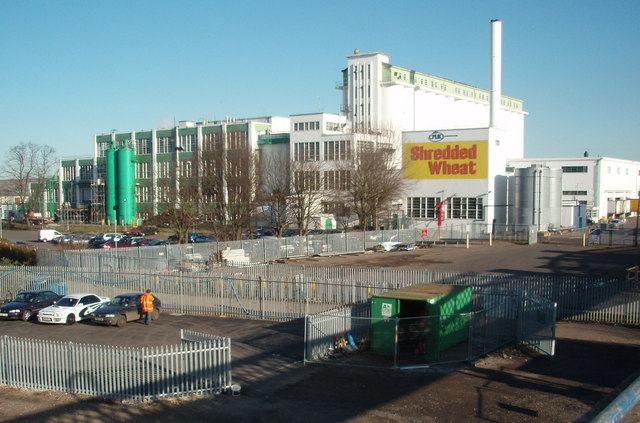
- The factory in 2007
- Interactive map of Nabisco Shredded Wheat Factory
- 51°48′06″N 0°12′03″W
- Location: Welwyn Garden City
- OS grid reference: TL2414812975

History
- Built: 1924–26
- Original use: Production of shredded wheat

Site notes
- Architect: Louis de Soissons

Listed Building – Grade II
- Designated: 16 January 1981
- Reference no.: 1101084

The Nabisco Shredded Wheat Factory is a disused factory which formerly produced variants of the shredded wheat breakfast cereal in Welwyn Garden City, in the United Kingdom. It was designed by architect Louis de Soissons to encourage companies to establish factories in the industrial areas of garden cities. The design of the Welwyn Garden City factory was inspired by an existing one in Niagara Falls, New York, also operated by the Shredded Wheat Company of America. Two buildings were operational at the time of its opening: a southern grain silo complex of 18 silos, and a western three–storey production area. Further expansions to the factory took place in the 1930s and 1950s with the construction of 27 additional silos, a new production area, and office space.

The factory is considered a local landmark, with its image used heavily in marketing for Shredded Wheat to portray the cereal as healthier and more hygienic than alternatives. Some buildings on the site were granted Grade II heritage status by the Department of the Environment on 16 January 1981. Since closing in 2008, there have been proposals to redevelop the factory as a brownfield site for residential and commercial purposes. Parts of the factory have been demolished in preparation for anticipated construction work, including the newer 1930s silos.

== Background ==
The factory was designed by architect Louis de Soissons, who was responsible for the construction of Welwyn Garden City as a second attempt at developing the garden city concept. As a garden city, de Soissons wanted Welwyn Garden to have both residential and industrial areas to prevent it from becoming a commuter town. Advertisements were distributed in the national media inviting manufacturers to take up residence in Welwyn Garden. The eastern section of the town was assigned as its industrial district and multiple factories, including Shredded Wheat opened on Broadwater Road.

Shredded Wheat breakfast cereals were originally produced in the United States. The Shredded Wheat Company of America first arrived in the United Kingdom in 1908 with offices in Aldwych, London and began exports to the country later that year. Demand for the cereal within the UK grew sufficiently to warrant the construction of a domestic factory.The Shredded Wheat Company was attracted to the Welwyn Garden site because of its proximity to London, railway access and minimal pollution.

== Design and construction ==
The factory was designed by de Soissons between March–July 1924. Inspiration for the Welwyn Garden factory's architecture was taken from the Shredded Wheat Company's Niagara Falls factory. Regardless, de Soissons was still responsible for the designs of the boiler house, garage and wheat elevators. Construction had begun by May 1924, with an application for planning permission submitted retrospectively in July.

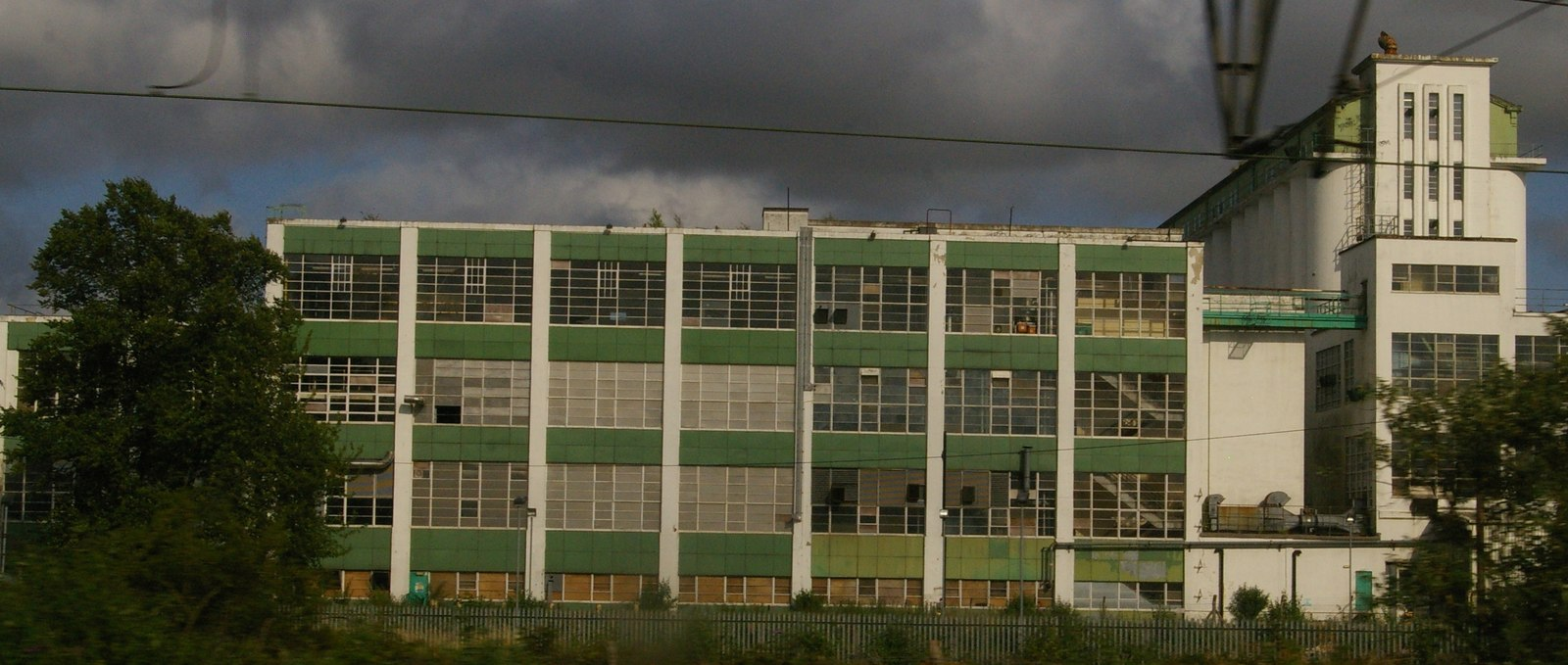
Western production hall in 2015

The modern architecture of the factory buildings contrasted with the Georgian style de Soissons used for the rest of Welwyn Garden. There are two main concrete structures supported by steel reinforcement: one to the south of the site and the other to the west. The southern building houses the factory's grain silos. On opening, there were eighteen silos in three rows of six, with a maximum capacity of 5,700 tons of grain. The silos are over 100 feet (30 m) tall and covered by an "attic storey". The western building is a three–storey structure which was used as a production hall. Its multi-storey design incorporates reinforced columns to create large amounts of floor and ceiling space; this was to help support a planned extension of the building by an additional two additional stories that was ultimately not pursued. Furthermore, it allowed for the installation of a large quantity of windows on the outside walls to let in natural light, however this led to heat and light problems during the building's tenure. The silos were built by Peter Lind & Company Ltd. and the other buildings by Messrs. F.P. Henderson Ltd.

Further developments took place in the 1930s and 1950s. The 1937–39 expansion attempted to maintain the visually–appealing elements of the original factory's design, involving the construction of a single–storey production hall and 27 additional silos, increasing the number to 45. Expansions in the 1950s disregarded attempts at maintaining the original factory's aesthetics, with the development of office space and an extension of the factory floor at the cost of workers' recreational space.

== Operational history ==
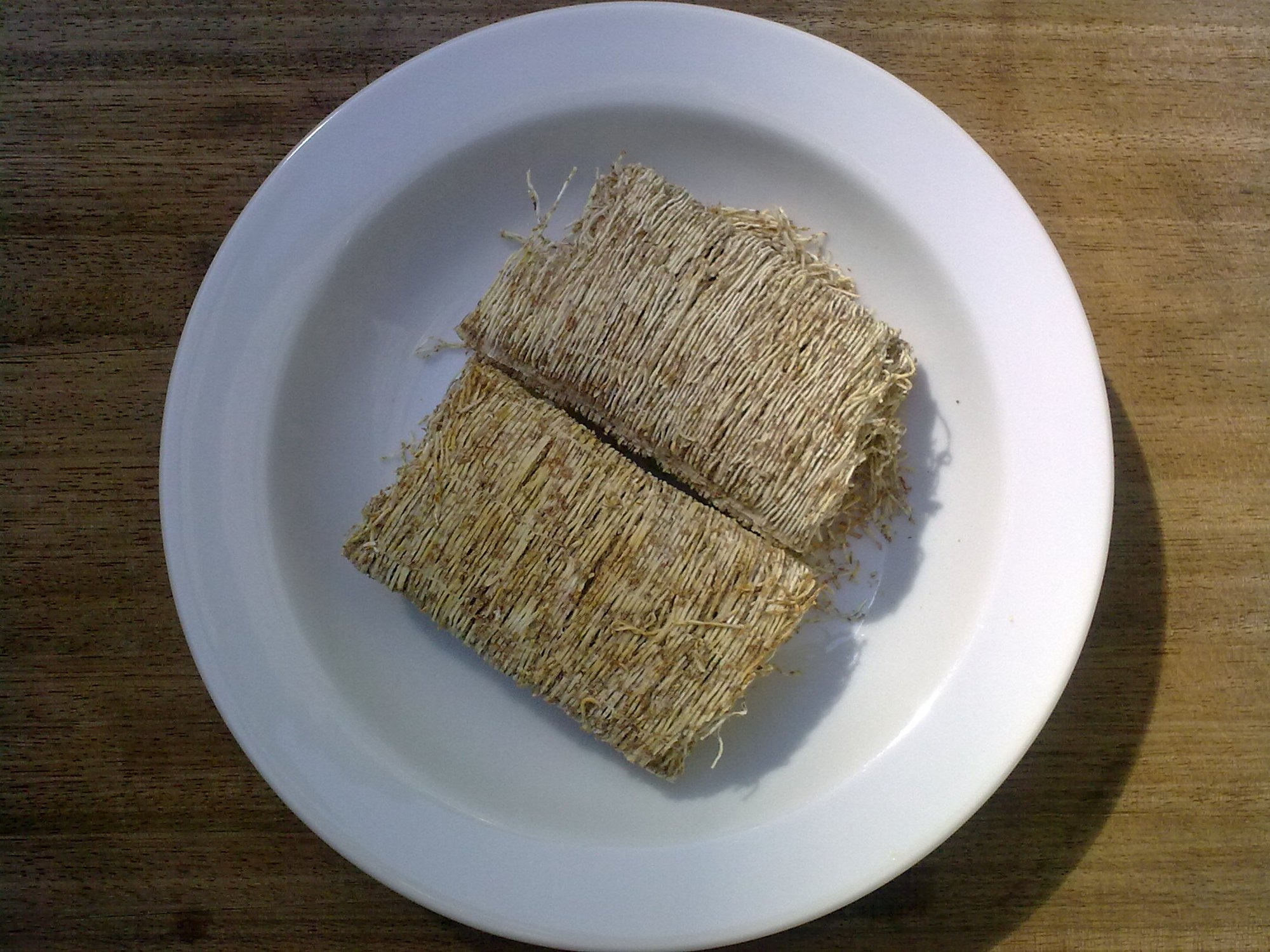
Two shredded wheat "biscuits"

The factory was opened by James Gascoyne-Cecil, the 4th Marquess of Salisbury, in March 1926. Operations were powered with gas from local gasworks. Grain was transported through the factory using vertical elevators. It was washed and passed through a pressure cooker, then shredded with rollers. The shredded grain was moulded into the required shape and finally baked in ovens.

Manufacturing was expanded to other shredded wheat products throughout the factory's tenure, such as "Small Shredded Wheat" in 1939 and Shreddies in 1953. Products which were not variants of shredded wheat were later introduced, including cake mixes in 1955 and Ritz crackers in 1961. This led to a reorganisation of the factory floor from its original "U-shape" to a more complex line structure. Despite good sales, some products, including Golden Nuggets, were discontinued due to high production costs and an incompatibility with the new line format.

The factory originally had workers pack the cereal manually with the assistance of electric conveyor belts. In 1960, the packing and quality control process was automated by machinery, reducing the number of workers involved in the packing process from sixteen to six.

== Cultural history ==
Shredded wheat cereals were promoted in the UK as a healthy breakfast option produced in a hygienic environment, and the factory's aesthetic was used as a marketing tool. This was achieved through the inclusion of whitewashed concrete and ceramic tiles in the exterior design, as well as its location in a garden city with little pollution. The welfare of the factory workers was also publicized, with recreational facilities such as football pitches and showers available to them upon opening. These details were advertised on cereal packets produced in the factory and on delivery vans, with an image of the factory on every cereal packet until 1960.

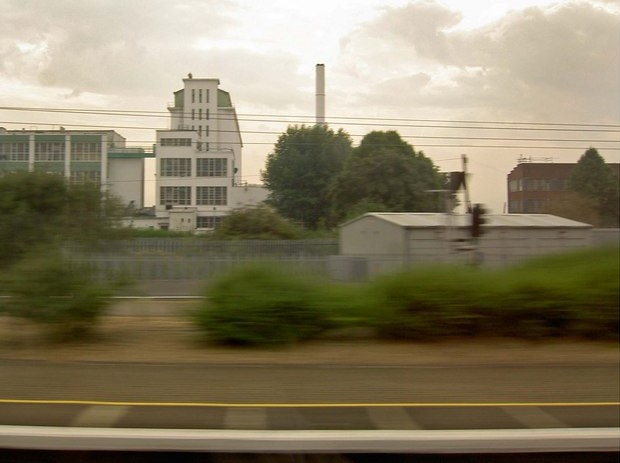
The factory, as seen from a train

The factory was nicknamed "The Wheat". Visitors were invited to view the factory in further support of marketing on its cleanliness. The factory is considered to be a local landmark, and elements of it remain visible to rail passengers travelling on the East Coast Main Line. Parts of the factory were granted Grade II heritage status by Historic England on 16 January 1981, and it was the entry for 1926 in the Twentieth Century Society's book 100 Buildings 100 Years.

The Shredded Wheat Company of America was acquired by the National Biscuit Company in 1928, later abbreviated to Nabisco. The factory was an important local employer, with many locals working there or knowing people employed by it. The factory was acquired by Cereal Partners Worldwide in 1990, who closed the site in 2008 to lower manufacturing costs by consolidating production lines. Production was moved to Staverton, Wiltshire costing 370 jobs.

== Redevelopment ==
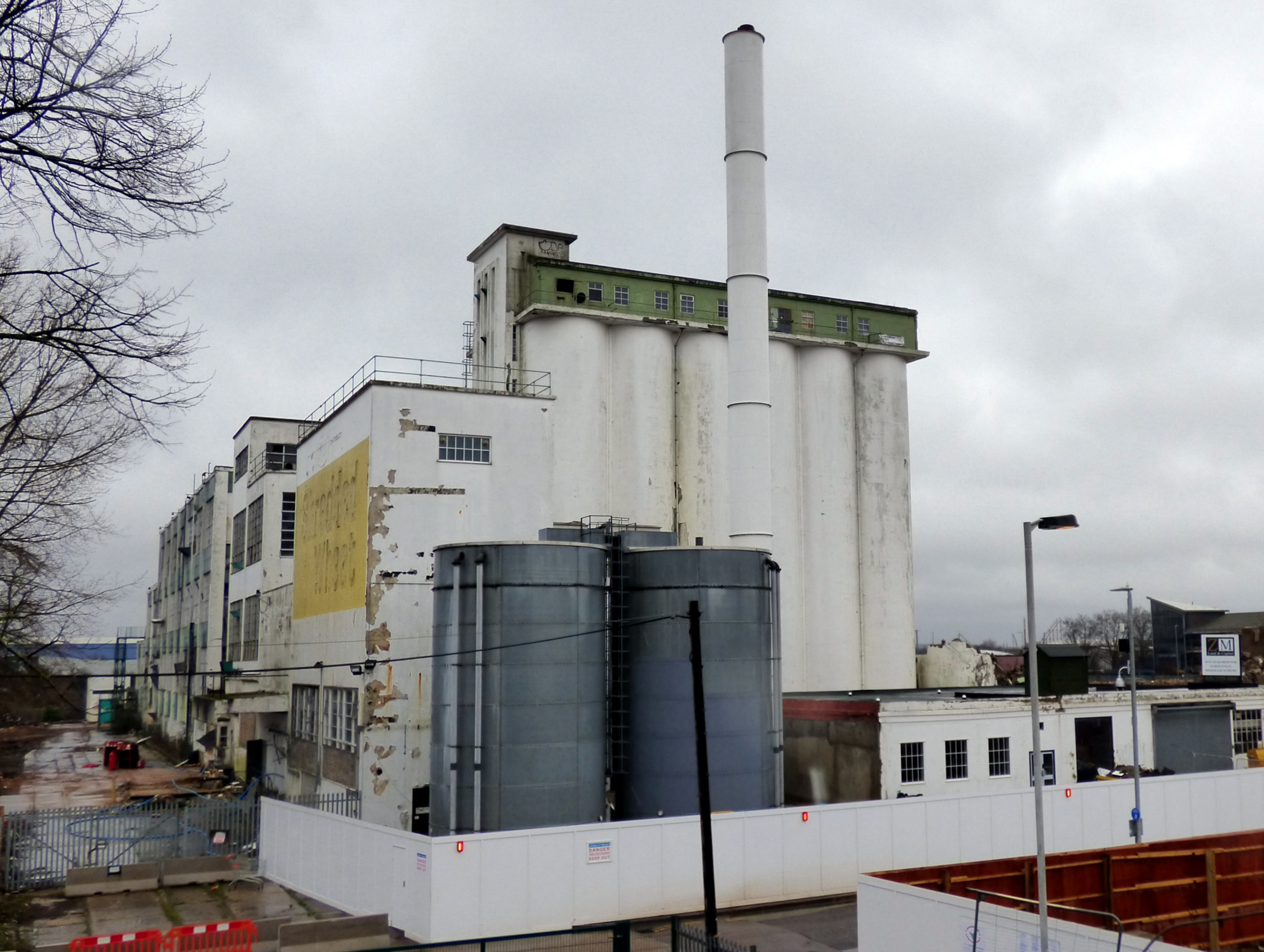
Silo complex following 2018 partial demolition

There have been various attempts at redevelopment. It was first sold in 2008 to Spenhill, who initially attempted to build a Tesco superstore. The plans included a controversial demolition of all the factory's silos, and planning permission was eventually refused in 2012. The firm later gained permission for a mixed–use development in 2017 which included the construction of up to 850 homes, development of urban green spaces, and the restoration and conversion of the 18 original silos into commercial buildings. Spenhill subsequently sold the site to two property development businesses. Demolition of the newer 1930s silos took place on 17 January 2018 in preparation for future construction work.

The current scheme for redevelopment is the "Wheat Quarter". Proposals in the January 2021 planning application included the building of 1,220 apartments on the factory site. Critics of the development noted that the ten-storey apartment blocks were significantly larger than a previously enforced five-storey cap, so they would overshadow existing buildings in Welwyn Garden's town centre. The Welwyn Garden City Heritage Trust argued that the remaining silos were important to the town's heritage and would be hidden by the new plans. In January 2024 the eleven-acre northern part of the development was bought by Malaysian firm IJM Corporation. The sale included planning permission for 811 apartments and the renovation of listed factory buildings for non-residential purposes.

The Shredded Wheat Factory and the former Roche Products factory (now Griffin Place) are among the few surviving industrial buildings from Welwyn Garden City's original interwar development. Griffin Place's conversion has been used an example of successfully adapting the town's industrial buildings for new residential use.

== Sources ==
- "THE NABISCO SHREDDED WHEAT FACTORY, Non Civil Parish – 1101084 | Historic England". Historic England. Archived from the original on 19 May 2024.
- Collins, Nick (April 2018). Former Nabisco Shredded Wheat Factory (PDF) (Report). Archived (PDF) from the original on 17 May 2024.
- Butterfield, Richard (1999). Goodman, David (ed.). The European Cities and Technology Reader: Industrial to Post-industrial City. Psychology Press. ISBN 9780415200820.
- Morgan, Nina (18 January 2018). "Farewell to Shredded Wheat silos: Pictures of demolition work". Welwyn Hatfield Times. Archived from the original on 19 May 2024.
- Hollis, Geoffrey (18 May 2022). ""An Ideal Factory producing an Ideal Food"". Welwyn Garden City Heritage Trust.
- Smith, Matthew (1 July 2021). "Welwyn Garden City's Shredded Wheat silos: The historic disused factory that's dividing the town". Hertfordshire Mercury. Archived from the original on 19 May 2024.
- Lewis, Alex (12 March 2017a). "Vision for Welwyn Garden City's Shredded Wheat site unveiled". Welwyn Hatfield Times. Archived from the original on 25 May 2024.
- Foskett, Ewan (26 February 2014). "Shredded Wheat factory is one of the top 100 buildings of 20th Century". Welwyn Hatfield Times. Archived from the original on 29 May 2024.
- "Factory shuts with 370 jobs lost". BBC News. 14 September 2005. Archived from the original on 20 May 2024.
- Bryant, Adam (2 September 1992). "COMPANY NEWS; General Mills Plans to Buy Nabisco's Lineup of Cereals". The New York Times. ISSN 0362-4331. Archived from the original on 15 January 2018.
- "Tesco buys Shredded Wheat site". Welwyn Hatfield Times. 13 February 2008. Archived from the original on 29 May 2024.
- Lewis, Alex (21 June 2017b). "Welwyn Garden City's former Shredded Wheat factory changes hands". Welwyn Hatfield Times.
- Kay, Jamie (17 June 2021). "1,200 flats could be built on old Shredded Wheat factory site in Welwyn Garden City". Hertfordshire Mercury. Archived from the original on 20 June 2024.
- Moutney, Dan (5 January 2024). "Malaysian-based developer makes Wheat Quarter purchase". Welwyn Hatfield Times. Archived from the original on 19 May 2024.
- Devan, Priya (12 January 2024). "IJM Land acquires land in UK for mixed-use development". The Edge Malaysia. Archived from the original on 19 May 2024.
