= Welwyn Garden City =

Town in Hertfordshire, England

Coordinates: 51.8062°N 0.1932°W

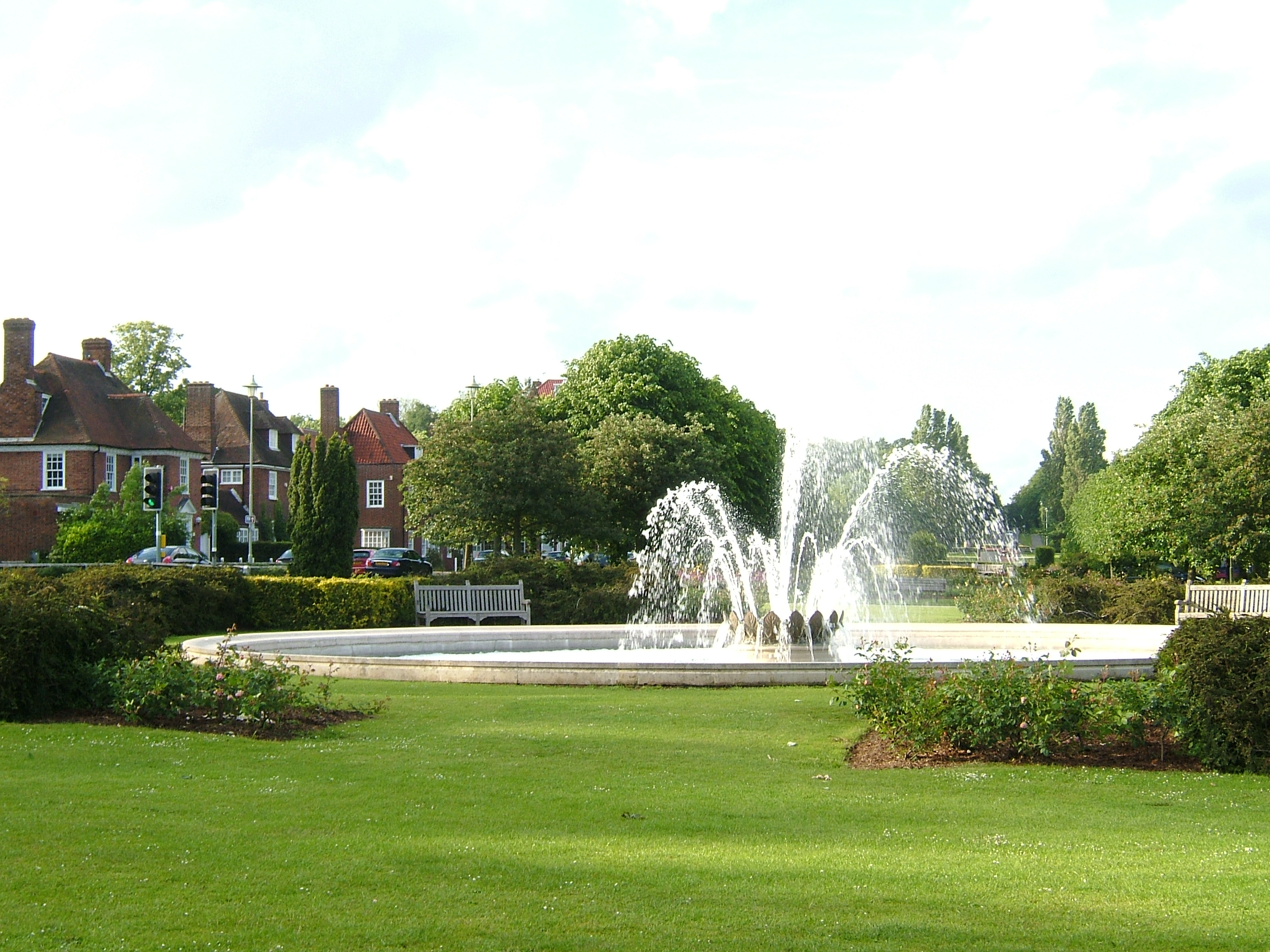
- View to the northwest from the Parkway Fountain

- Location within Hertfordshire
- Population: 51,505 (2021 Census)
- OS grid reference: TL245135
  - London: 20 mi (32 km)
- District: Welwyn Hatfield
- Shire county: Hertfordshire
- Region: East
- Country: England
- Sovereign state: United Kingdom
- Post town: Welwyn Garden City
- Postcode district: AL7, AL8
- Dialling code: 01707
- Police: Hertfordshire
- Fire: Hertfordshire
- Ambulance: East of England
- UK Parliament: Welwyn Hatfield

Welwyn Garden City (/ˈwɛlɪn/ WEL-in) is a town in the Welwyn Hatfield district, in Hertfordshire, England, 20 miles (32 km) north of London. It was the second garden city in England (founded 1920) and one of the first new towns (designated 1948). It is unique in being both a garden city and a new town and exemplifies the physical, social and cultural planning ideals of the periods in which it was built. In 2021 it had a population of 51,505.

== History ==
Welwyn Garden City was founded by Sir Ebenezer Howard in 1920 following his previous experiment in Letchworth Garden City. Howard had called for the creation of planned towns that were to combine the benefits of the city and the countryside and to avoid the disadvantages of both. It was designed to be 'The Perfect Town'. The Garden Cities and Town Planning Association had defined a garden city as

a town designed for healthy living and industry of a size that makes possible a full measure of social life but not larger, surrounded by a rural belt; the whole of the land being in public ownership, or held in trust for the community

In 1919, Howard arranged for the purchase of land in Hertfordshire that had already been identified as a suitable site. A company called Second Garden City Limited was formed in October 1919 to start buying the land and developing the town. On 4 February 1920, the company's board decided to call the new garden city Digswell, taking the name of the existing small village which would be surrounded by the development. Six days later they changed their minds, deciding instead to call it Welwyn Garden City, reflecting that the project was already being discussed generally as the "new garden city near Welwyn". On 29 April 1920, the company changed its name to become Welwyn Garden City Limited. Sir Theodore Chambers chaired the company, whilst Louis de Soissons was appointed as architect and town planner, Charles Purdom as finance director and Frederic Osborn as secretary. The first house was occupied just before Christmas 1920.

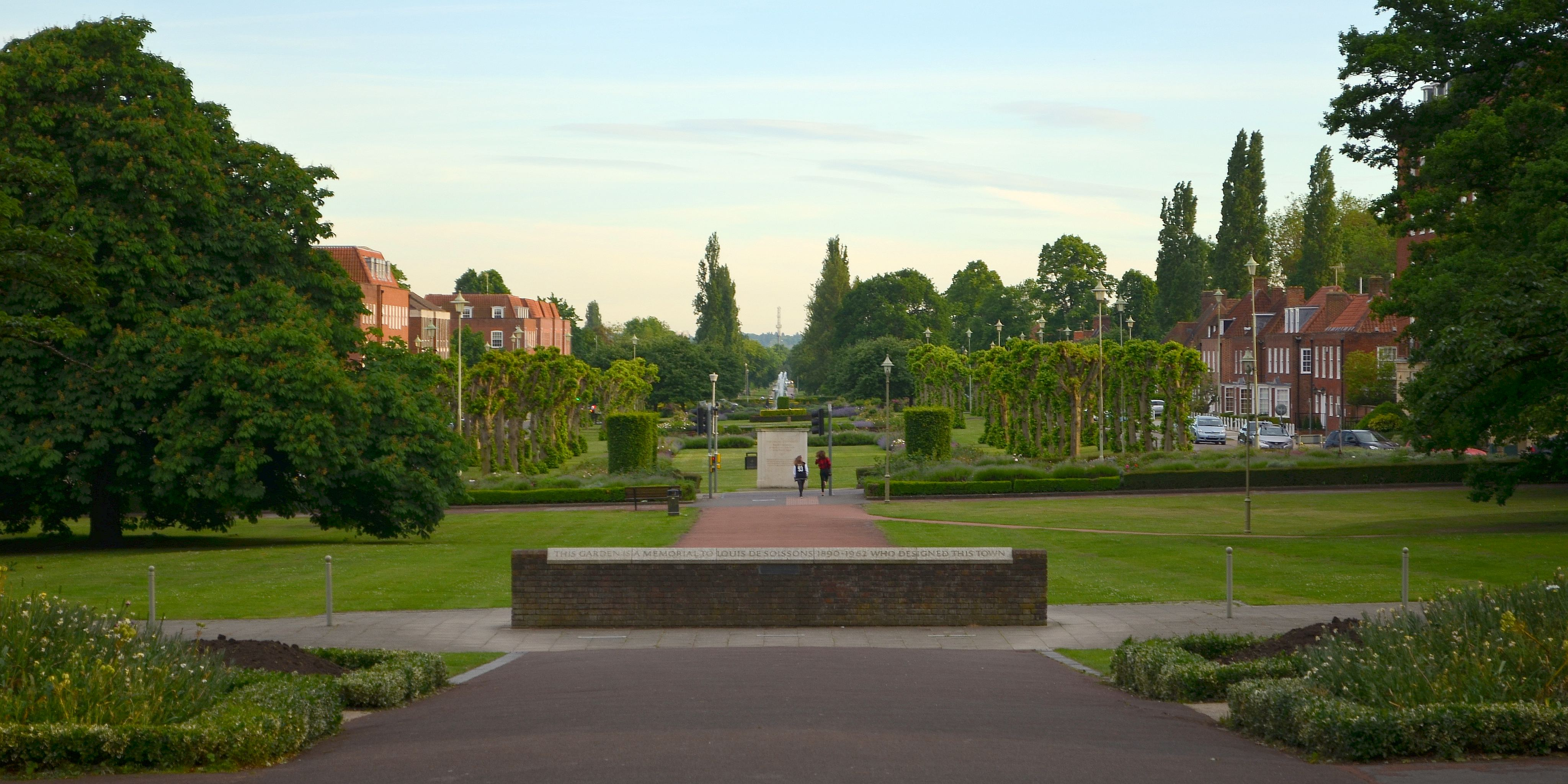
View along the Parkway to the south from the memorial garden to Louis de Soissons in May 2017

The town is laid out along tree-lined boulevards with a neo-Georgian town centre. It has its own environmental protection legislation, the Scheme of Management for Welwyn Garden City. Every road has a wide grass verge. The spine of the town is Parkway, a central mall or scenic parkway, almost a mile long. The view along Parkway to the south was once described as one of the world's finest urban vistas. Older houses are on the west side of Parkway and newer houses on the east side

The original planners intended that all the residents of the garden city would shop in one shop and created the Welwyn Stores, a monopoly which caused some local resentment. Commercial pressures have since ensured much more competition and variety, and the Welwyn Stores were in 1984 taken over by the John Lewis Partnership.

In 1948, Welwyn Garden City was designated a new town under the New Towns Act 1946 (9 & 10 Geo. 6. c. 68) and the Welwyn Garden City company handed its assets to the Welwyn Garden City Development Corporation. Louis de Soissons remained as its planning consultant. That year The Times compared Welwyn Garden City with Hatfield. It described Welwyn Garden City as a world-famous modern new town developed as an experiment in community planning and Hatfield as an unplanned settlement created by sporadic building in the open country. "Welwyn, though far from perfect, made the New Towns Act possible, just as Hatfield, by its imperfection, made it necessary." In 1966, the Development Corporation was wound up and handed over to the Commission for New Towns. The housing stock, neighbourhood shopping and green spaces were passed to Welwyn Hatfield District Council between 1978 and 1983.

The New QEII Hospital, completed in June 2015, offers outpatient, diagnostic and ante/postnatal services.

A shopping mall, the Howard Centre, was built in the 1980s, incorporating a replacement for the original "temporary" railway station.

There is a resurgence of interest in the ethos of the garden city and the type of neighbourhood and community advocated by Howard, prompted by the problems of metropolitan and regional development and the importance of sustainability in government policy.

On the outskirts of Old Welwyn village, the Welwyn Roman baths are preserved in a steel vault underneath junction 6 of the A1(M) and are open to visitors.

The local civic society, which aims to preserve and conserve the garden city ethos, is the Welwyn Garden City Society.

The international ecumenical Focolare movement has its British headquarters at Welwyn Garden City.

In 2008, during construction of a site for HSBC, 60 unsecured argonite fire suppressant cylinders discharged, killing one person, injuring six others and causing substantial damage. Three firms were later convicted of health and safety offences.

2020 saw the 100th anniversary for Welwyn Garden City with a series of celebrations planned. They could not all be done amidst the Coronavirus pandemic.

Welwyn Garden City had a population of 46,619 in 2011, and 51,735 (estimated) in 2016.

== Governance ==
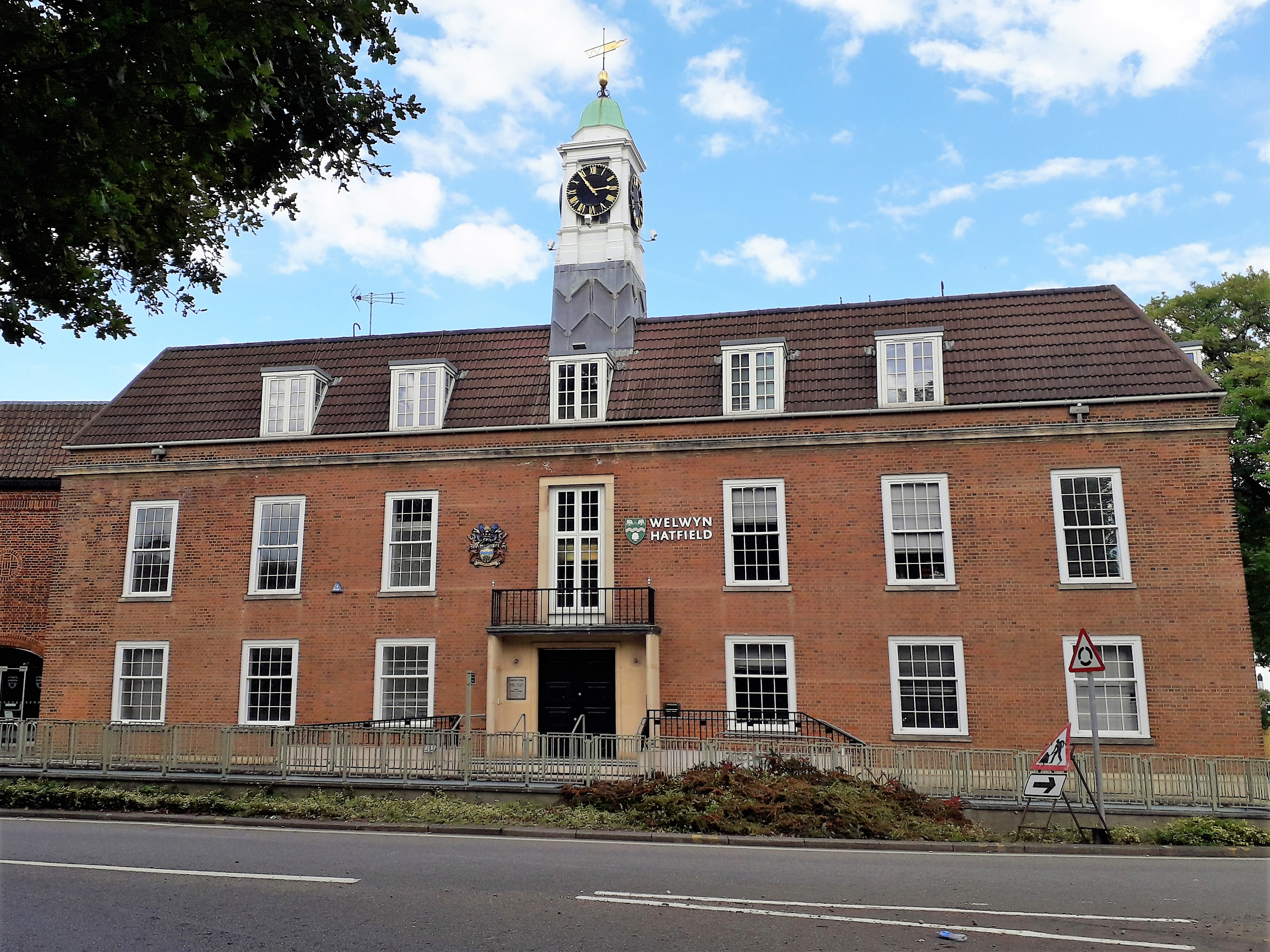
Welwyn Hatfield Borough Council Offices

Welwyn Garden City is part of the Welwyn Hatfield Borough, comprises seven local authority wards, and lies within the county of Hertfordshire and the parliamentary constituency of Welwyn Hatfield. Welwyn Hatfield Borough Council has its offices in Welwyn Garden City. The MP for Welwyn Hatfield is Andrew Lewin (Labour). The nearby town of Hatfield and the village of Welwyn have parish councils with limited responsibilities, but Welwyn Garden City has none, although it had one between 1921 and 1927.

=== Administrative history ===
Welwyn Garden City
- Urban District
Coat of arms
- Population
  - 1931: 8,586
  - 1971: 39,630
- History
  - Created: 1 April 1927
  - Abolished: 31 March 1974
  - Succeeded by: Welwyn Hatfield
  - HQ: Welwyn Garden City
- Contained within
  - County Council: Hertfordshire

The land earmarked for the town in 1920 straddled the parishes of Hatfield, Digswell, Welwyn and Tewin. On 1 October 1921, a civil parish called Welwyn Garden City was created from parts of those four parishes. The new parish was initially part of the Welwyn Rural District. By 1923, the Welwyn Garden City parish council was based in offices on Bridge Road, on the edge of the site identified for the new town centre of the garden city.

=== Welwyn Garden City Urban District (1927–1974) ===
The parish of Welwyn Garden City was made an urban district on 1 April 1927, making it independent of the Welwyn Rural District Council.

New offices were built on the site of the former parish council's offices at the corner of Bridge Road and The Campus. The new building was formally opened in January 1937. This building served as the headquarters of Welwyn Garden City Urban District Council until its abolition in 1974. Between 20 May 1948 and 31 March 1966 the development of the town was also administered by the Welwyn Garden City Development Corporation, set up under the New Towns Act 1946 (9 & 10 Geo. 6. c. 68).

Welwyn Garden City Urban District Council was granted a coat of arms on 15 December 1958.

Welwyn Garden City Urban District was abolished under the Local Government Act 1972, merging with Welwyn Rural District and Hatfield Rural District to become the district of Welwyn Hatfield on 1 April 1974. No successor civil parish was created for the town, and so it is governed directly by Welwyn Hatfield District Council (Borough Council after 2006). The Welwyn Garden City Urban District Council's former offices at The Campus are still used by Welwyn Hatfield Borough Council as its headquarters.

== Geography ==
Welwyn Garden City experiences a maritime or oceanic climate (Köppen climate classification Cfb), in common with the rest of the United Kingdom. The town experiences warm summers and cool winters.

Climate data for Welwyn Garden City
Month	Jan	Feb	Mar	Apr	May	Jun	Jul	Aug	Sep	Oct	Nov	Dec	Year
Mean daily maximum °C (°F)	8 (46)	9 (48)	12 (54)	14 (57)	18 (64)	21 (70)	23 (73)	20 (68)	20 (68)	16 (61)	11 (52)	8 (46)	15 (59)
Mean daily minimum °C (°F)	5 (41)	5 (41)	6 (43)	8 (46)	10 (50)	13 (55)	15 (59)	16 (61)	13 (55)	11 (52)	8 (46)	5 (41)	10 (50)
Average precipitation mm (inches)	50.7 (2.00)	39.9 (1.57)	31.7 (1.25)	46.2 (1.82)	38.9 (1.53)	46.4 (1.83)	33.1 (1.30)	43.6 (1.72)	49.7 (1.96)	70.7 (2.78)	58.1 (2.29)	56.9 (2.24)	565.9 (22.28)

== Economy ==
Ever since its inception as a garden city, Welwyn Garden City has attracted a strong industrial base with several designated employment areas. Among the companies trading in the town are:

- Henleys Medical Supplies Ltd
- Baxters
- British Lead Mills
- Cashbrokers
- The Danish Bacon Company (DBC foodservice)
- Emis Professional Publishing
- Figleaves.com
- HSBC's high-security global data centre
- Roche
- Ocado
- PayPoint
- Ratcliff Palfinger
- Duncan Print Group
- Sigma Corporation
- Tesco has its head office at Shire Park, a business park in the north-east of the town. The site was once an ICI chemical works. Tesco gradually moved there from the late 1990s and closed its original Cheshunt head office in favour of additional Shire Park buildings.
- VEGA Group
- Welwyn Tool Group (formerly Welwyn Tool Company)
- Hertfordshire County Council's county supplies and contract services centre

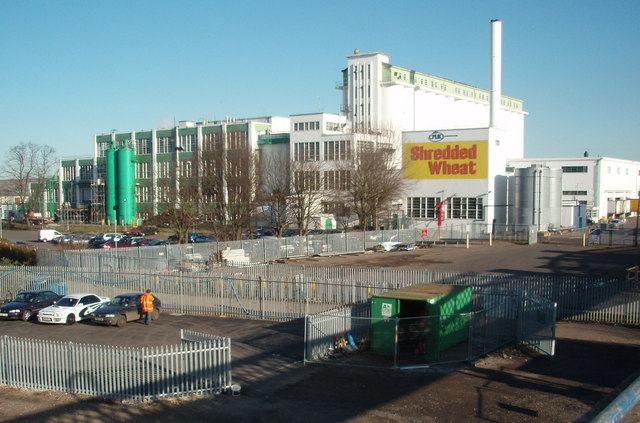
The Shredded Wheat factory as it was in 2007 while still in operation. The landmark Shredded Wheat sign, visible from trains arriving in Welwyn Garden City, has now been removed.

Welwyn Garden City was once well known as the home of the breakfast cereal Shredded Wheat, formerly made by Nabisco. With its large white silos, the disused Nabisco Shredded Wheat Factory is a landmark on rail routes between London and the north of England. The factory, designed by de Soissons and built in 1924 by Peter Lind & Company, is a Grade II listed building. Production moved to the Cereal Partners factory at Staverton, Wiltshire in 2007 when the owner, Nestlé, decided that the factory required significant and prohibitive investment, due to the age of the building. Tesco applied to build a supermarket on the site, but planning permission was refused by the local authority in January 2012 after significant public protest. In December 2018, the newly renamed "Wheat Quarter" area had planning permission approved for complete area redevelopment, consisting of 1,454 units, mainly homes, as well as office, retail and community uses.

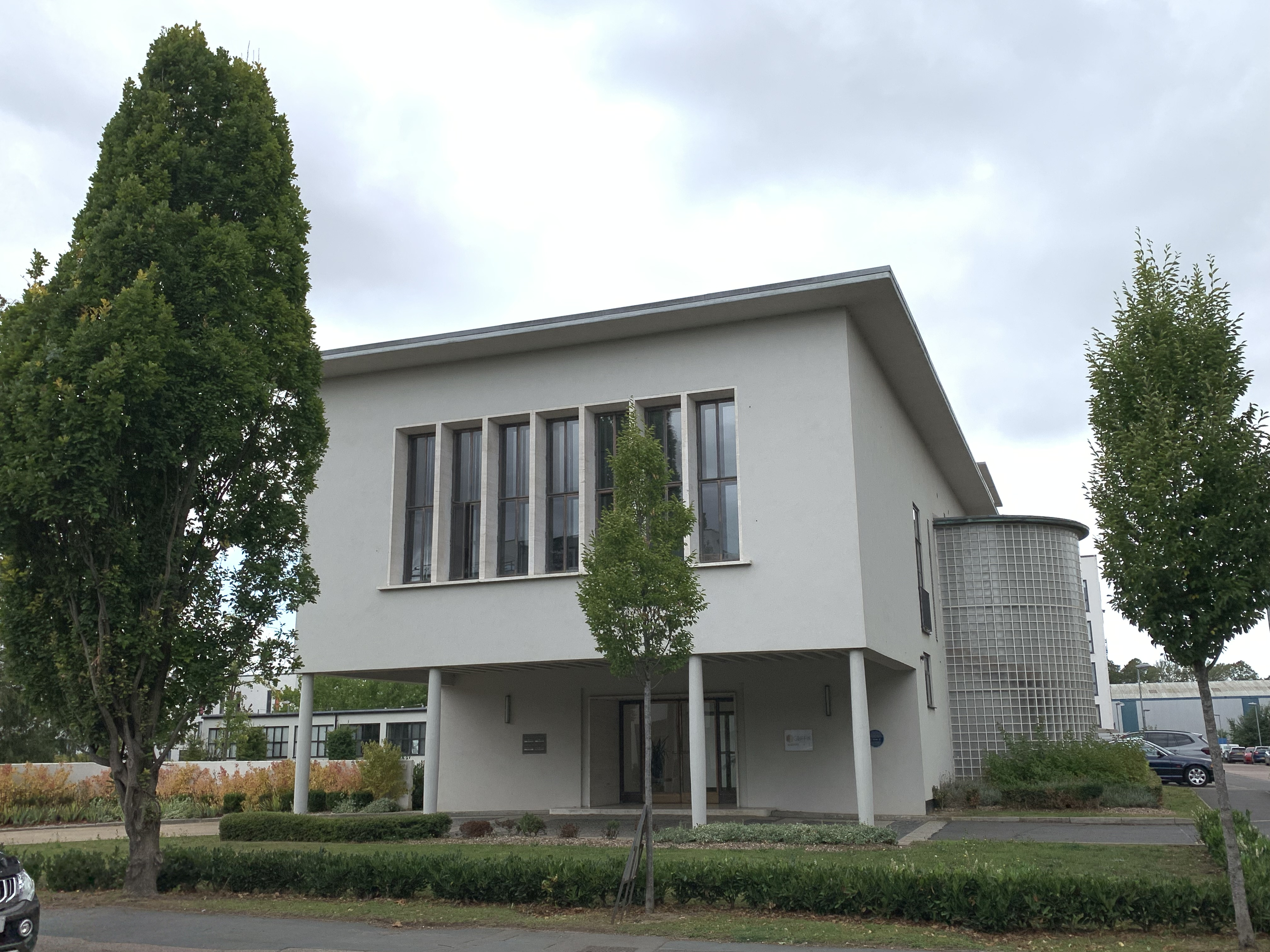
Griffin Place, formerly the Roche Products factory, built in 1938, named "Building of the Year" by The Architects' Journal in 1939.

The former Roche Products Factory on Broadwater Road is one of the town's earliest remaining industrial buildings. Built in 1938 and designed in the International Modernist style by the Swiss architect Otto Rudolf Salvisberg, it was named "Building of the Year" by The Architects' Journal in 1939, it served as Roche's UK headquarters and factory until 2005, and is now Grade II listed and converted into residential apartments under the name Griffin Place.

The former supermarket chain Fine Fare had its head office in the town at one time, as did ICI's Plastics Division.

Xerox formerly had offices in the town which opened in April 1995, but it closed in 2016 to make way for housing.

There is a Sainsbury's and a Waitrose in the town centre, and a Morrisons in Panshanger.

Welwyn Garden City's proximity to London makes it a convenient commuter town.

== Transport ==
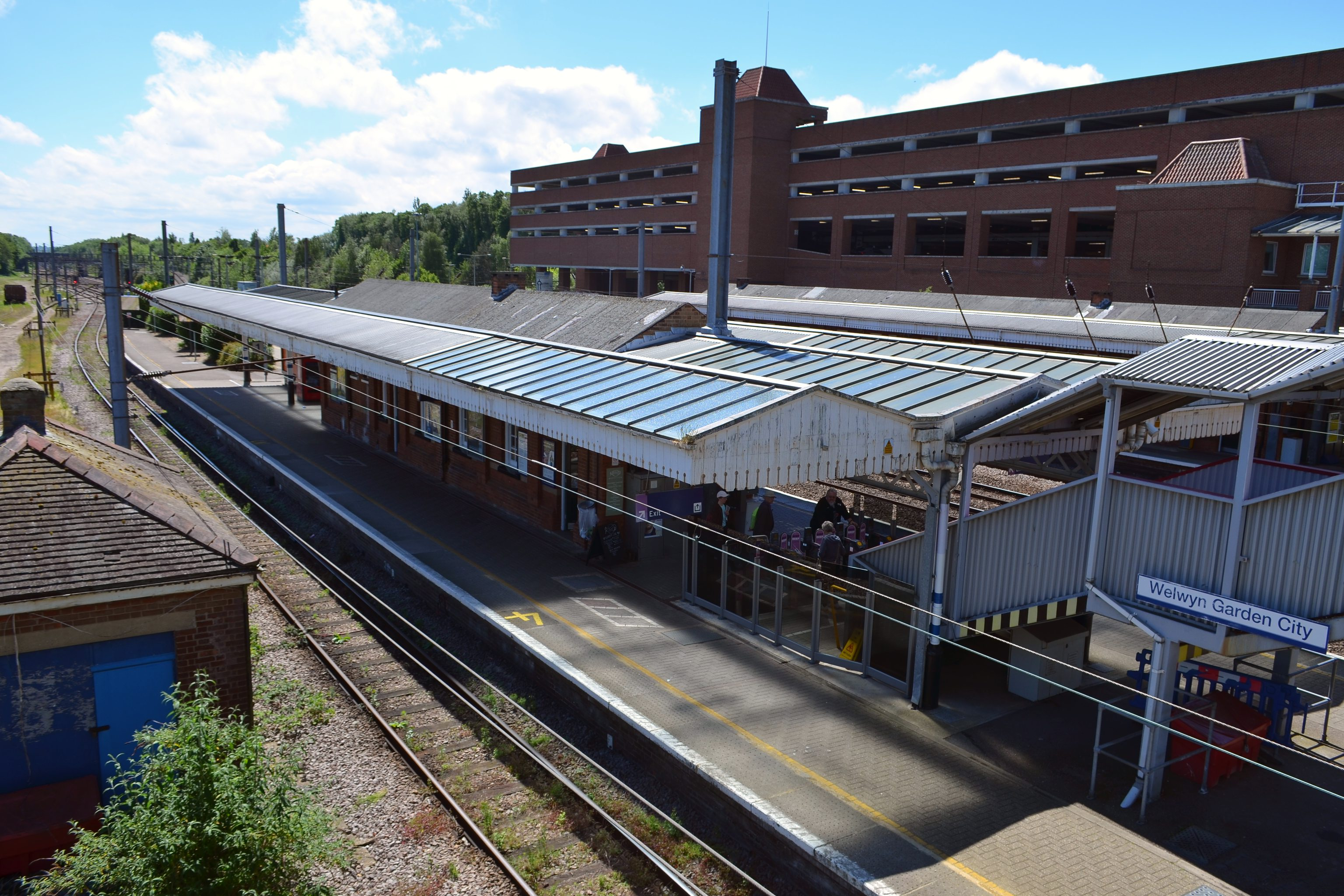
The railway station with the Howard Centre behind it, May 2017

Welwyn Garden City railway station is located in the town centre; it is served by two train operating companies:

- Great Northern operates regular southbound services to London Moorgate and London King's Cross; northbound trains connect to Stevenage, Letchworth and Cambridge
- Thameslink runs a peak hours service to Sevenoaks, via St Pancras International and London Blackfriars.

Buses are provided by Arriva Shires & Essex, Centrebus and Uno, with some assistance from Hertfordshire County Council. Key routes include:

- 301 links to Hatfield, St Albans, Knebworth and Stevenage
- 314 to Codicote and Hitchin.
- 653 Tiger Moth to St Albans, via Hatfield
- 724 runs from Harlow to Heathrow Airport, via Watford and Rickmansworth.

Welwyn Garden City is well-served by major arterial road routes, namely the A1(M) and the A414. The Great North Road also passes around it next to the A1(M). In addition, there are other links to St Albans, Harpenden and Luton (via B653), Hatfield (via A1000 and A1001) and Hertford (via B1000).

== Education ==
Welwyn Garden City has five secondary schools:

- Sherrardswood School
- Ridgeway Academy, a specialist Sports College (formerly Sir Frederic Osborn School, which was formed by the merging of The Welwyn Garden City High School and Attimore Hall School in 1968)
- Monks Walk School, a specialist Science Academy
- Knightsfield School for the Deaf
- Stanborough School, a specialist Maths and Computing College (Formerly Welwyn Garden City Grammar School)

A campus of Oaklands College is located near the town centre.

== Culture ==
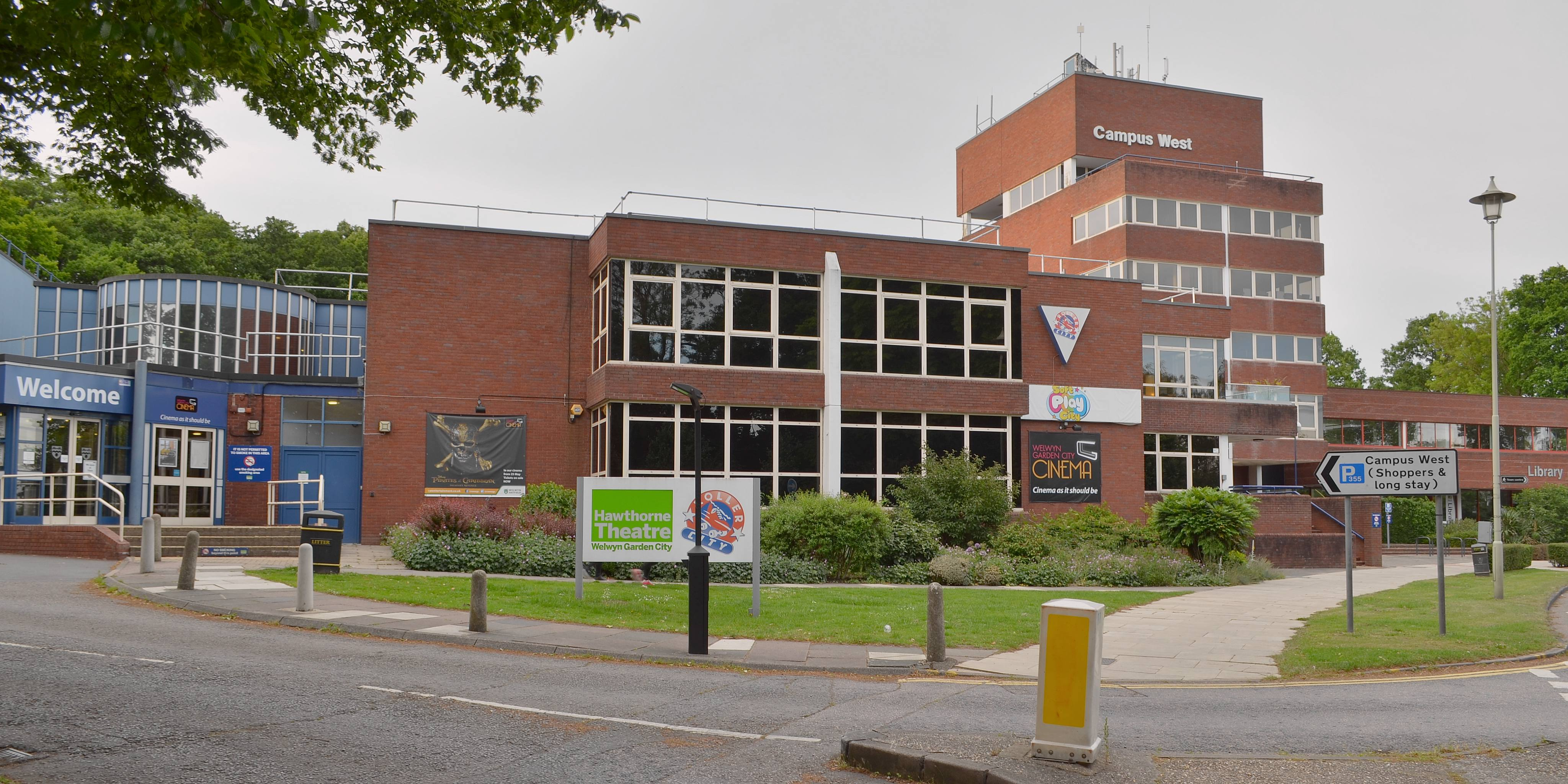
Welwyn Garden City cinema and library in May 2017

Welwyn Garden City's Music Society gave its first concert in 1921 within weeks of the town's foundation; its choir and orchestra, led by James Ross, have performed a regular concert season in the town ever since. The town also boasts a Concert Club, which promotes chamber music recitals, and a Male Voice Choir. Welwyn Garden City Band was founded in 1934. The Barn Theatre is a Grade II listed building on Handside Lane. Welwyn Thalians, an amateur dramatic and operatic group, has performed in the town since 1929.

== Media ==
Local news and television programmes are provided by BBC London and ITV London. Television signals are received from either the Crystal Palace or the local relay transmitters. BBC East and ITV Anglia can also be received from the Sandy Heath TV transmitter.

Local radio stations are BBC Three Counties Radio on 90.4 FM, Heart Hertfordshire on 106.9 FM and Radio Verulam on 92.6 FM.

The Welwyn Hatfield Times is the town's local weekly newspaper.

== Sport and leisure ==
The Gosling Sports Centre houses a dry ski slope, golf driving range, indoor and outdoor tennis, squash, football pitches, an athletics track, velodrome, a gym and bowls as well as a trampoline park.

Welwyn Garden City football team founded in 1921, known as the Citizens, are based in Herns Lane.

The King George V playing field, on the boundary of the old Hatfield Hyde village is the home of Hatfield Hyde Cricket Club since 1889, predating Welwyn Garden City by 31 years. The playing field was once used by the England football team for training. During the 1966 football World Cup the French, West German and Argentinian football teams stayed at the Homestead Court Hotel alongside the King George V playing fields.

There are three golf courses: Panshanger, owned and operated by the borough council, Mill Green Golf Course located in Gypsy Lane, and the Welwyn Garden City Golf Club, of which Nick Faldo was once a member.

The Digswell Park Sports Association brings together Welwyn Garden City Cricket Club, Welwyn Garden City Bowls Club and the Digswell Park Sports and Social Club, at Digswell Park, Knightsfield. Welwyn Garden City Cricket Club was founded in 1921 and runs 7-weekend senior sides along with a youth cricket programme. WGCCC First XI competes in the Saracens Herts Premier League.

The town has a rugby club called Welwyn RFC.

The lake in Stanborough Park is the home of Welwyn Garden City Sailing Club (founded 1973) and the WGC Angling Club.

== Notable people ==
See List of people from Welwyn Garden City

== See also ==
- Garden city movement
- Ciudad Jardín, Buenos Aires
- Welwyn RFC
