= White City (Berlin) =

Large housing estate with 1268 apartments in Berlin, Germany

Coordinates: 52.568978°N 13.352503°E

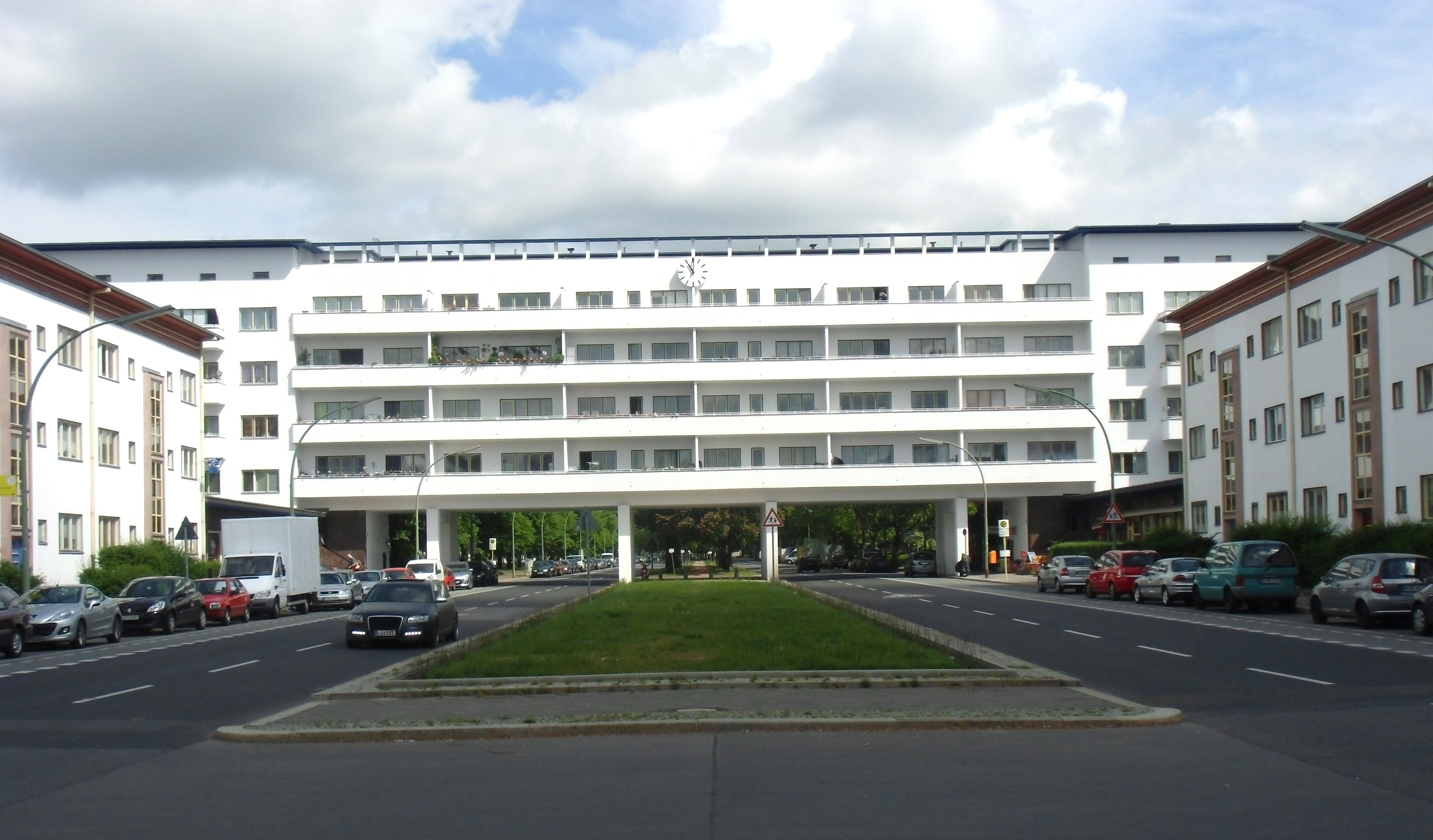
Bridge house at the Aroser Allee

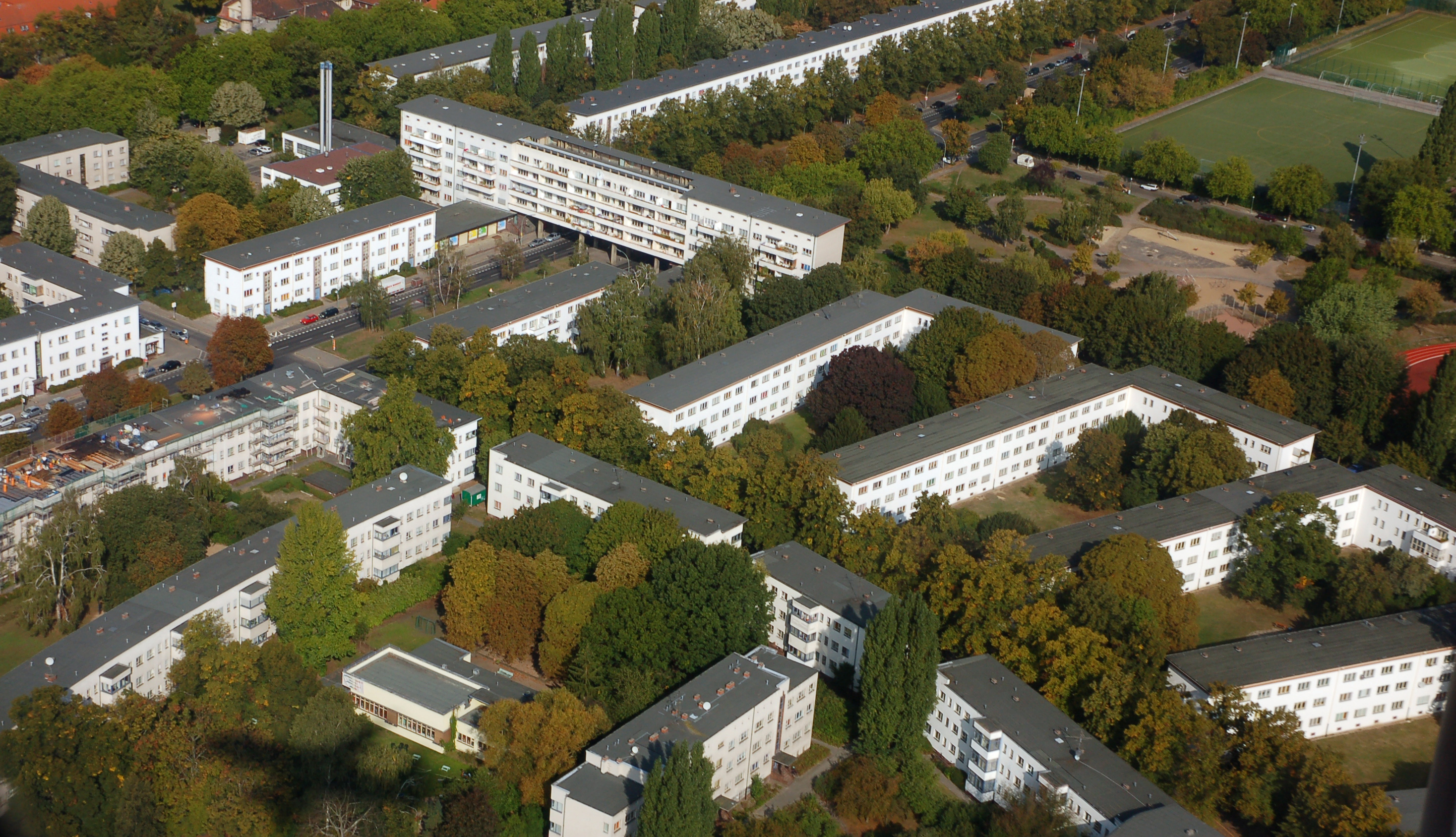
The grounds

Map of the grounds

The White City is a large housing estate with 1268 apartments in Berlin's Reinickendorf district. It is one of the six Berlin Modernism Housing Estates and has been listed as a UNESCO World Heritage Site since 2008. This housing estate is the last one rooted in modern architecture, and was built during the Weimar Republic.

Like many other housing estates, the White City was built in order to combat the housing shortage during the years 1928 to 1931, by Gemeinnützige Heimstättengesellschaft ‚Primus‘ mbH, a non-profit housing association. The architects Otto Rudolf Salvisberg, Bruno Ahrends and Wilhelm Büning built the housing estate according to the blueprint of Otto Rudolf Salvisberg. The town and country planner was Ludwig Lesser. In order to minimize the building costs, smaller craft businesses were hired.

By the end of construction, 1600 apartments had been built at the price of 14DM per square meter. For the first time, a big housing complex would have central heating. For this purpose a block-type thermal power station in the Aroser Allee has been in use since 2012. A kindergarten was built in one of the courtyards along with 20 shops within the housing estate.

The White City has an open internal structure consisting mainly of terrace buildings with green spaces. Colourful detail like coloured drainpipes, doors, roof overhangs and window frames amplify the white of the houses. The architectural flagship is the bridge house at the Aroser Allee.
