= Scherk =

Scherk is a surname. Notable people with the surname include:

- Heinrich Scherk (1798–1885), German mathematician
- Joël Scherk (1946–1980), French physicist
- Johann Theodor Scherk (1836–1923), politician in South Australia

== See also ==
- Scherk (company)
