= Louis de Soissons =

British architect

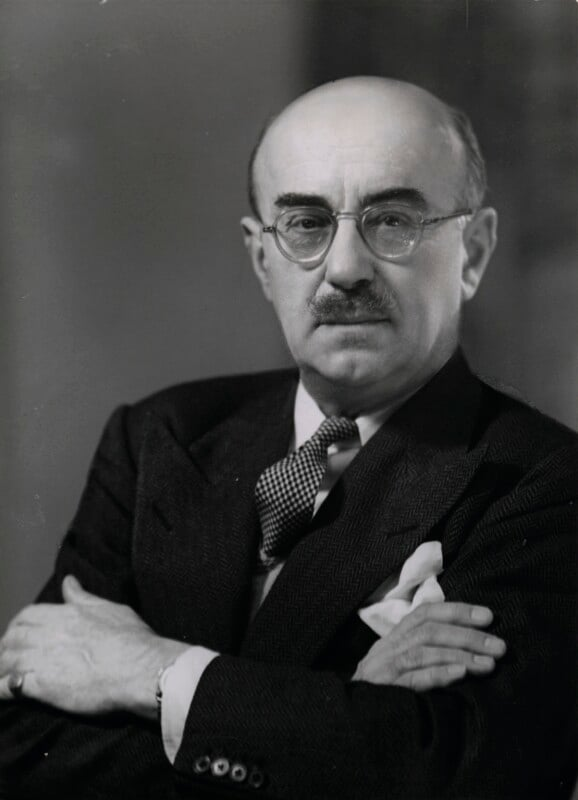
De Soissons in 1953

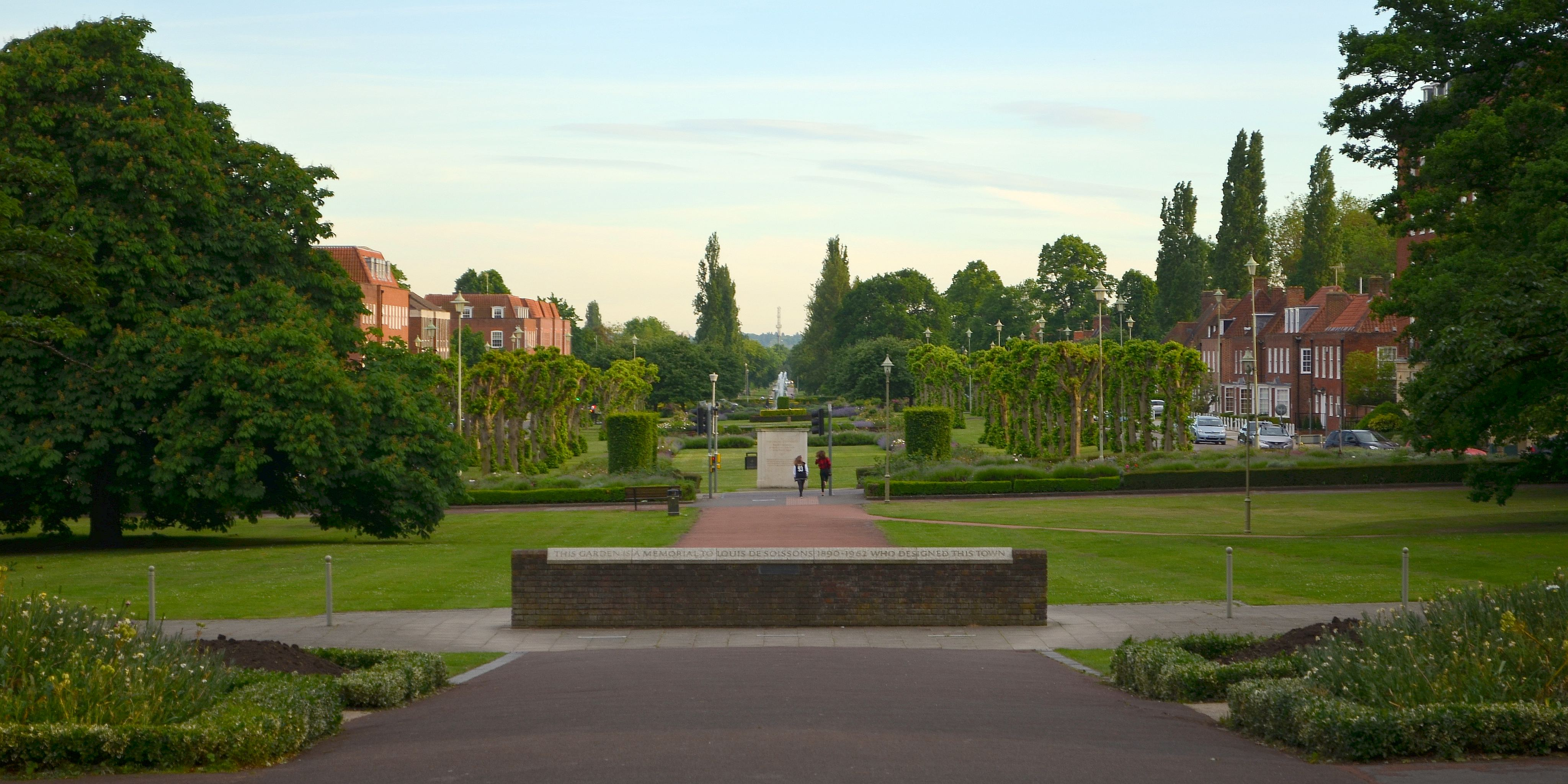
Welwyn Garden City memorial garden to de Soissons in May 2017

Louis Emanuel Jean Guy de Savoie-Carignan de Soissons CVO RA FRIBA (1890–1962) was the younger son of Charles de Savoie-Carignan, Count de Soissons (with claimed descent, through an illegitimate son, from Thomas Francis of Savoy, Prince of Carignano). An architect, he was professionally known as Louis de Soissons.

== Early life ==
De Soissons was born in Montreal, Quebec, Canada, but moved in childhood with his family to London. In 1913 he won the first year of the Henry Jarvis scholarship of the Royal Institute of British Architects, enabling three years of European travel and study.

== Career ==
The first major commission of the practice he set up (Louis de Soissons Partnership) was the 'master plan' (so-called – a very early use of the term) for Welwyn Garden City (1920), a planned town created by Ebenezer Howard in neo-Georgian style, built on cheap redundant farmland. Louis de Soissons was appointed architect for the town in 1920 and the practice was significantly involved in its development over the next 60 years. He designed the Nabisco Shredded Wheat Factory for the eponymous Canadian company.

Other important early projects included the Home Office and Duchy of Cornwall Estates in London, where the future Edward VIII was the effective client and the Nag's Head Estate in Bethnal Green, London, E2 which was one of the few private "slum clearance" projects undertaken by a private landlord. When young he had been much influenced by 18th-century Italian architecture, and gained a reputation as a classical architect, but with a deep humanism resulting from his new town work.

After the Second World War the firm expanded to Plymouth and Exeter to carry out a wide variety of architectural work. Nearly 50 war cemeteries were designed for the Commonwealth War Graves Commission in Greece and Italy. Among de Soisson's designs was the Coriano Ridge War Cemetery in Coriano, Italy. Later the practice's buildings included a number of important buildings, such as the Wellcome Foundation, The Leathersellers Company (a reconstruction in 1948 after wartime bombing), the Royal College of Obstetricians and Gynaecologists in Regent's Park and the International Wool Secretariat in Carlton Terrace, London. He also designed the Hobbs' Gates at The Oval cricket ground, in memory of Sir Jack Hobbs, the noted Surrey and England player, and a statue of George VI.

The Crown Estates Commissioners retained the firm to restore Cumberland and Chester Terraces, by John Nash. Work was carried out on seating for the Marylebone Cricket Club (MCC). Work for academic institutions included Eton College, and Exeter and Cambridge Universities. The firm changed tack in the 1960s, and commercial work such as the Brighton Marina shows a greater deference to modernism. The firm's headquarters are now in Luton, Bedfordshire.

== Recognition and personal life ==
In 1923 Louis de Soissons became a fellow of the RIBA and a member of both the Town Planning Institute, later RTPI, and the Société des Architectes Diplômés par le Gouvernement. He was made an academician – a fellow of the Royal Academy – in 1953 and was awarded the RIBA distinction in town planning in 1945.

In the 1956 New Year Honours he was decorated with the CVO.

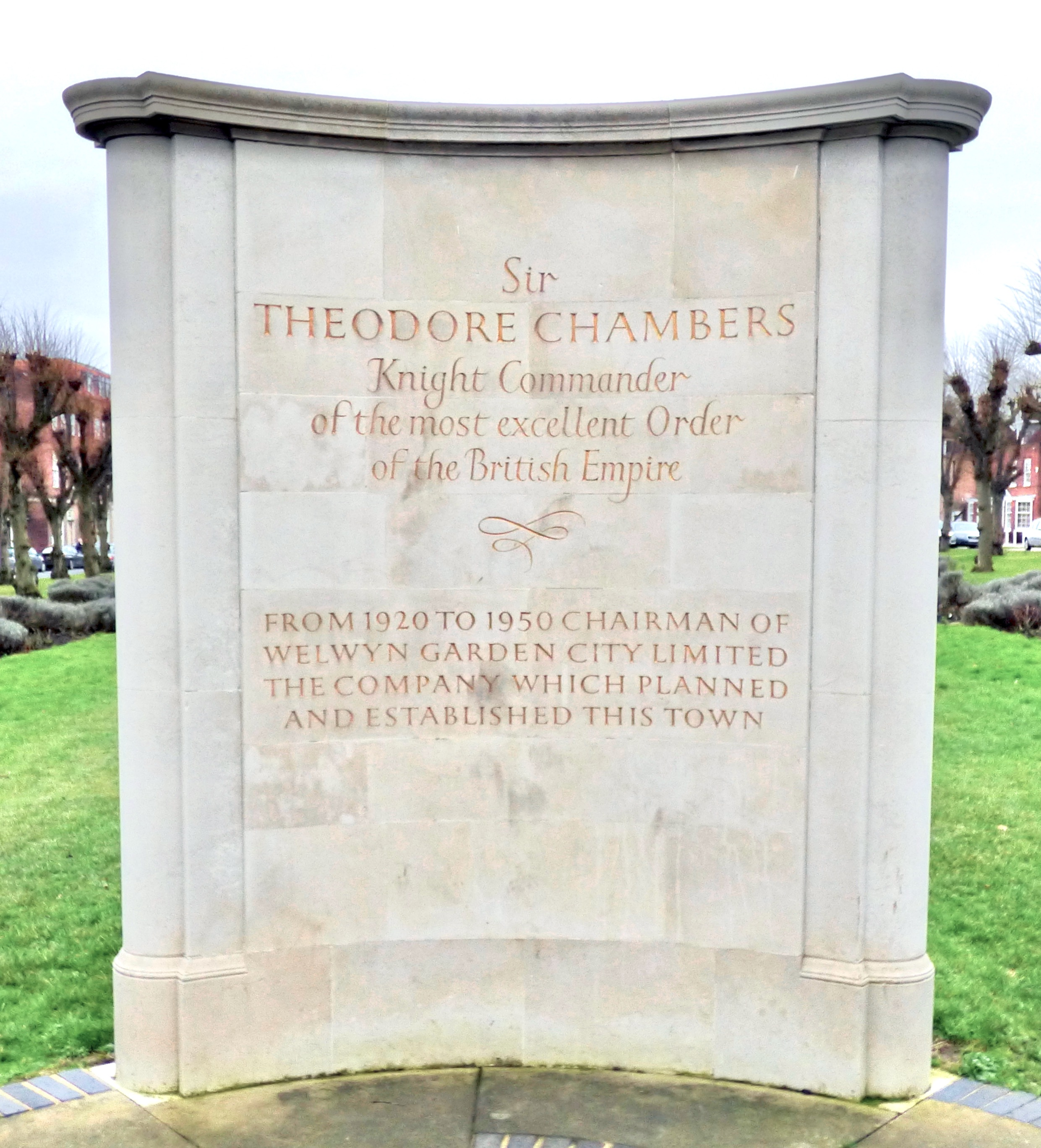
Memorial to Sir Theodore Chambers, Welwyn Garden City (with lettering designed by William Sharpington)

Louis de Soissons married Elinor Penrose-Thackwell, by whom he had three sons: Philip (killed in action on 23 May 1941 while serving in the Royal Navy), Maurice (1927–2019) and Brian (1929–2009).
